= Napstjært railway halt =

Railway halt in Vendsyssel, Denmark

Napstjært
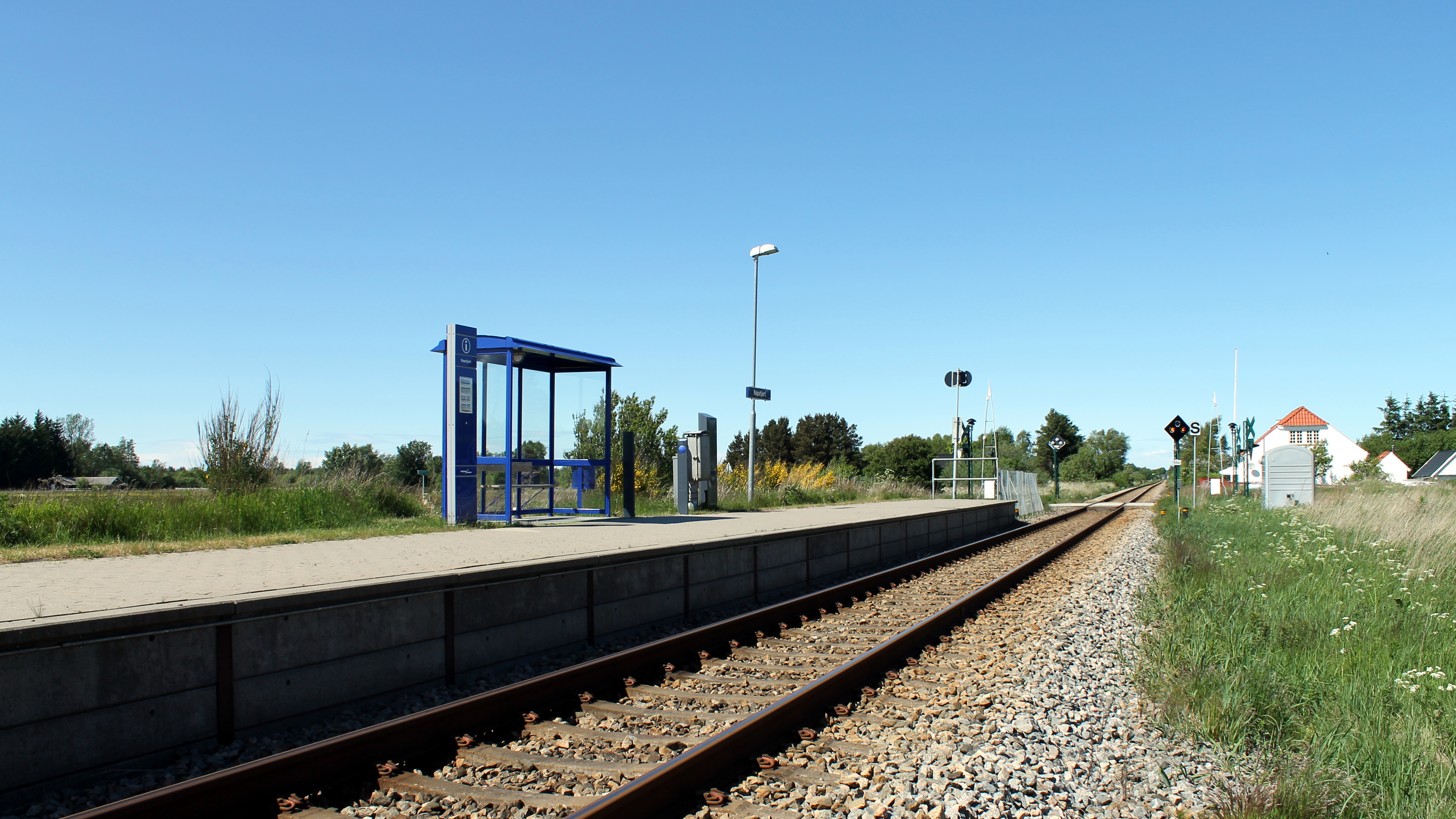
- Napstjært halt in 2012

General information
- Location: Napstjært Mosevej; Napstjært, 9981 Jerup; Frederikshavn Municipality; Denmark
- Coordinates: 57°33′16.49″N 10°24′29.91″E
- Elevation: 4.8 metres (16 ft)
- Owner: Nordjyske Jernbaner
- Line: Skagen Line
- Platforms: 1
- Train operators: Nordjyske Jernbaner

History
- Opened: 1890, 2006
- Closed: 2005

Services
Preceding station	Nordjyske Jernbaner	Following station
Jerup towards Hobro	Hobro – Skagen Local train	Ålbæk towards Skagen
Jerup towards Hjørring	Hjørring – Skagen Local train Peak hours	Ålbæk towards Skagen
Location
- Location within Denmark

Napstjært railway halt (Danish: Napstjært Trinbræt) is a railway halt serving the settlement of Napstjært in Vendsyssel, Denmark.

The halt is located on the Skagensbanen railway line from Skagen to Frederikshavn, between Aalbæk and Jerup stations. The train services are currently operated by the railway company Nordjyske Jernbaner which run frequent local train services between Skagen and Frederikshavn.

== History ==
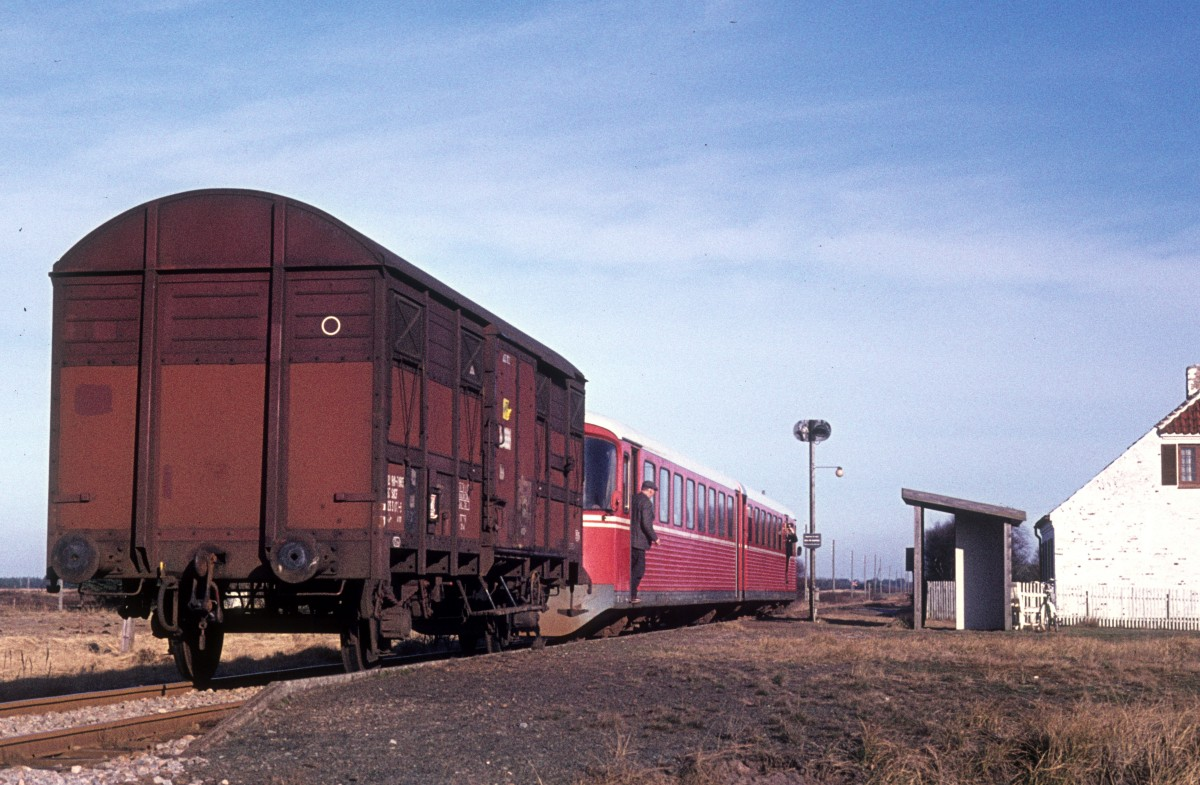
Napstjært halt in 1975

The halt was opened in 1890 when the railway started. It was closed in January 2005, but only a year later it opened again with a new platform and a new shelter.

== Operations ==
The train services are currently operated by the railway company Nordjyske Jernbaner (NJ) which run frequent local train services from Skagen station to Frederikshavn station with onward connections to the rest of Denmark.

== See also ==
- List of railway stations in Denmark
