= Bunken railway halt =

Railway halt in Vendsyssel, Denmark

Bunken
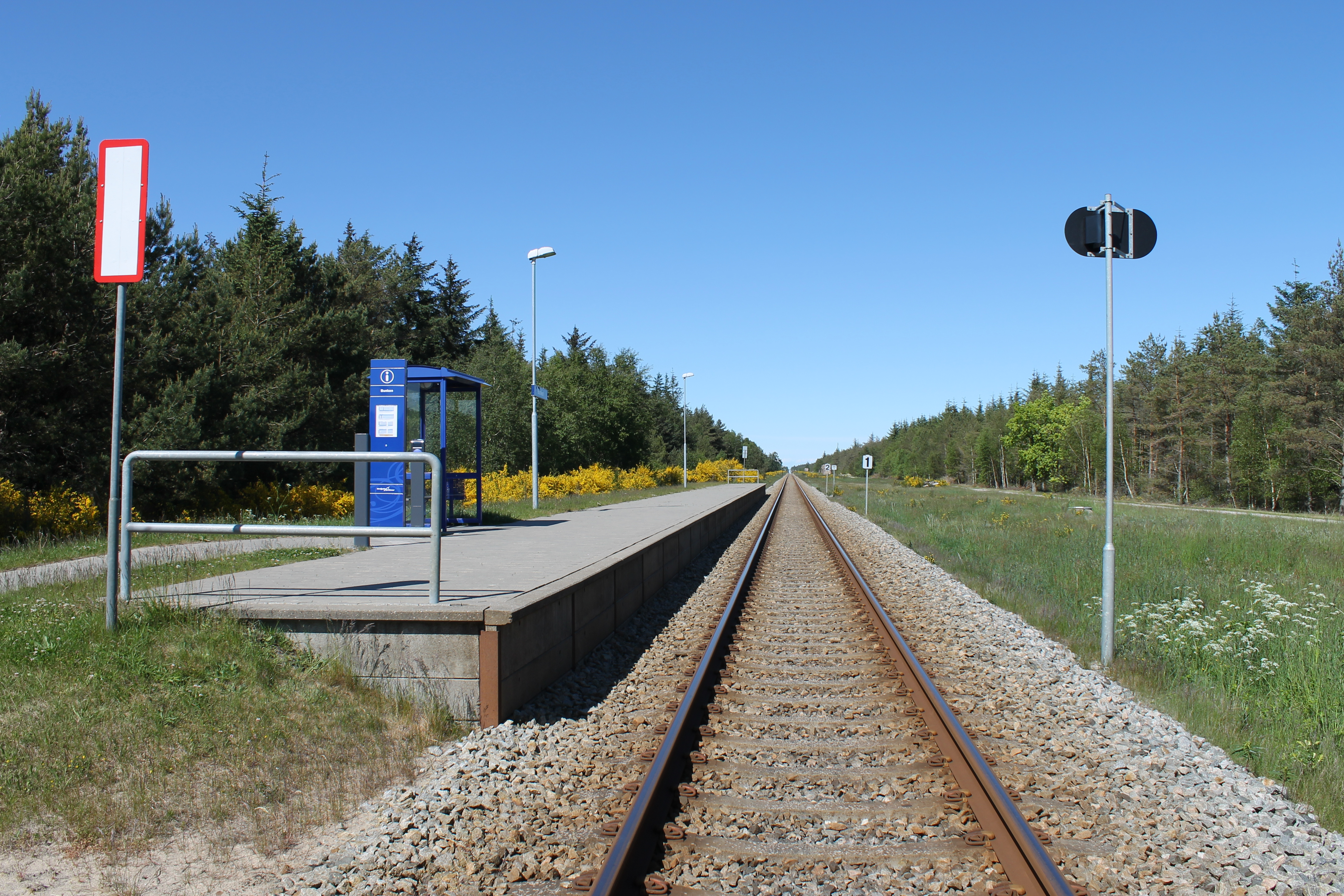
- Bunken railway halt in 2012

General information
- Location: Råbjergvej 10; Bunken, 9982 Ålbæk; Denmark
- Coordinates: 57°37′48.52″N 10°26′22.32″E
- Elevation: 6.2 metres (20 ft)
- Owner: Nordjyske Jernbaner
- Line: Skagen Line
- Platforms: 1
- Tracks: 1
- Train operators: Nordjyske Jernbaner

History
- Opened: 1890

Services
Preceding station	Nordjyske Jernbaner	Following station
Ålbæk towards Hobro	Hobro – Skagen Local train	Hulsig towards Skagen
Ålbæk towards Hjørring	Hjørring – Skagen Local train Peak hours	Hulsig towards Skagen
Location
- Location within Denmark

Bunken railway halt (Danish: Bunken Trinbræt) is a railway halt located in the southern part of Bunken Plantation south of Skagen in Vendsyssel, Denmark. The halt serves the area's many summer houses as well as the nearby folk high school and golf course.

The halt is located on the Skagensbanen railway line from Skagen to Frederikshavn between Hulsig station and Aalbæk station. It opened in 1890. The train services are currently operated by Nordjyske Jernbaner which run frequent local train services between Skagen station and Frederikshavn station.

== History ==
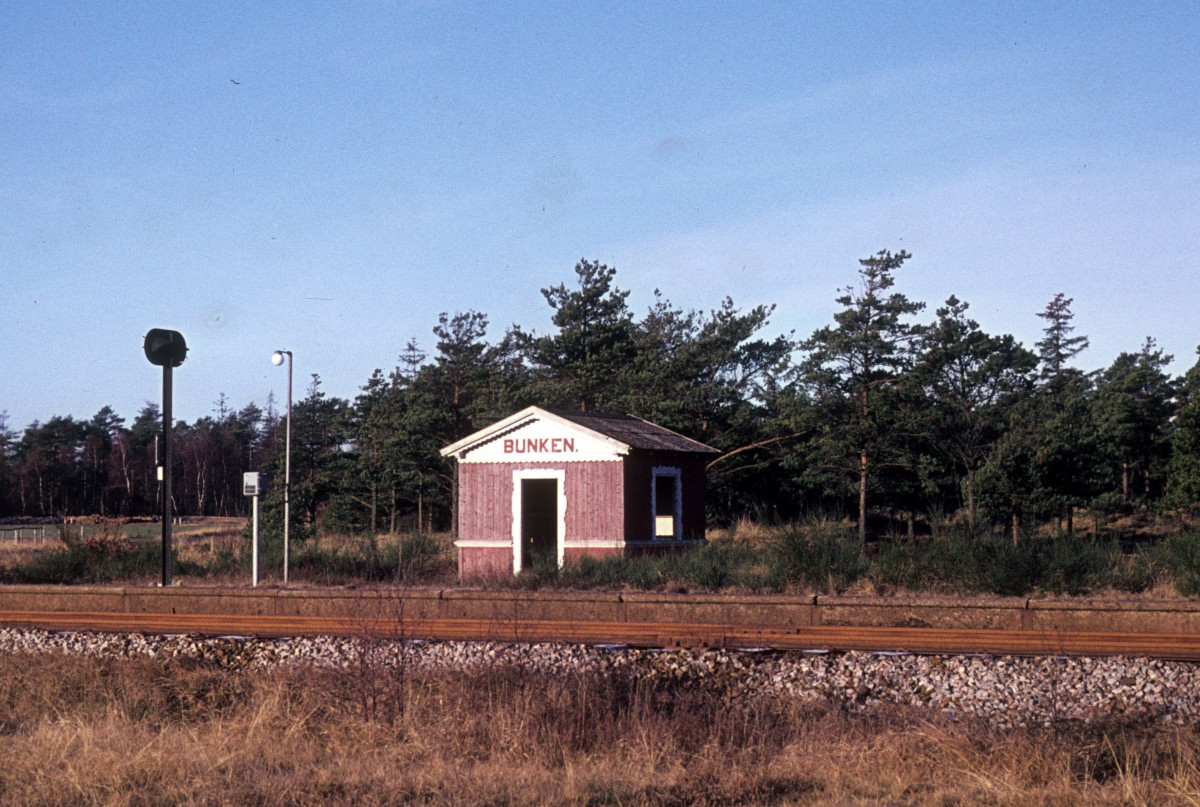
Bunken halt in 1975

The halt opened in 1890 when the railway started.

In 2006 the halt was renovated with a car park, a new platform and a new shelter.

== Operations ==
The train services are currently operated by the railway company Nordjyske Jernbaner (NJ) which run frequent local train services from Skagen station to Frederikshavn station with onward connections to the rest of Denmark.

== Gallery ==
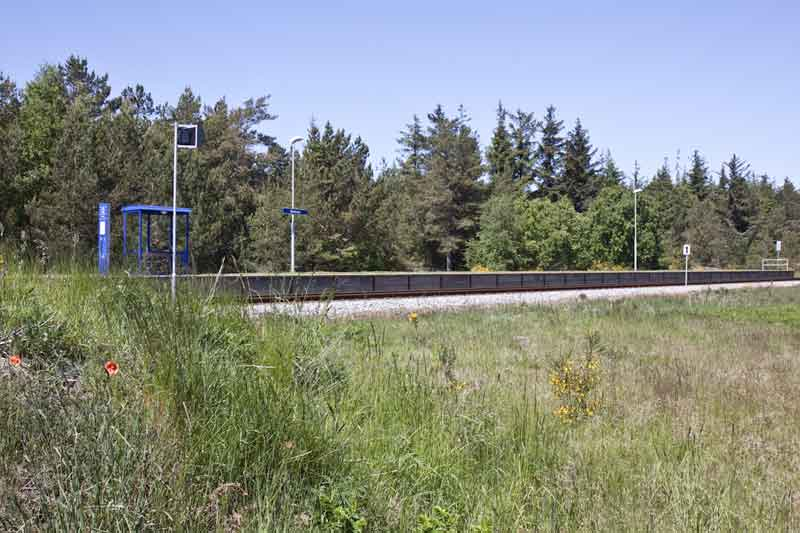
Bunken halt in 2012

== See also ==
- List of railway stations in Denmark
