= Hulsig railway station =

Railway station in Vendsyssel, Denmark

Hulsig
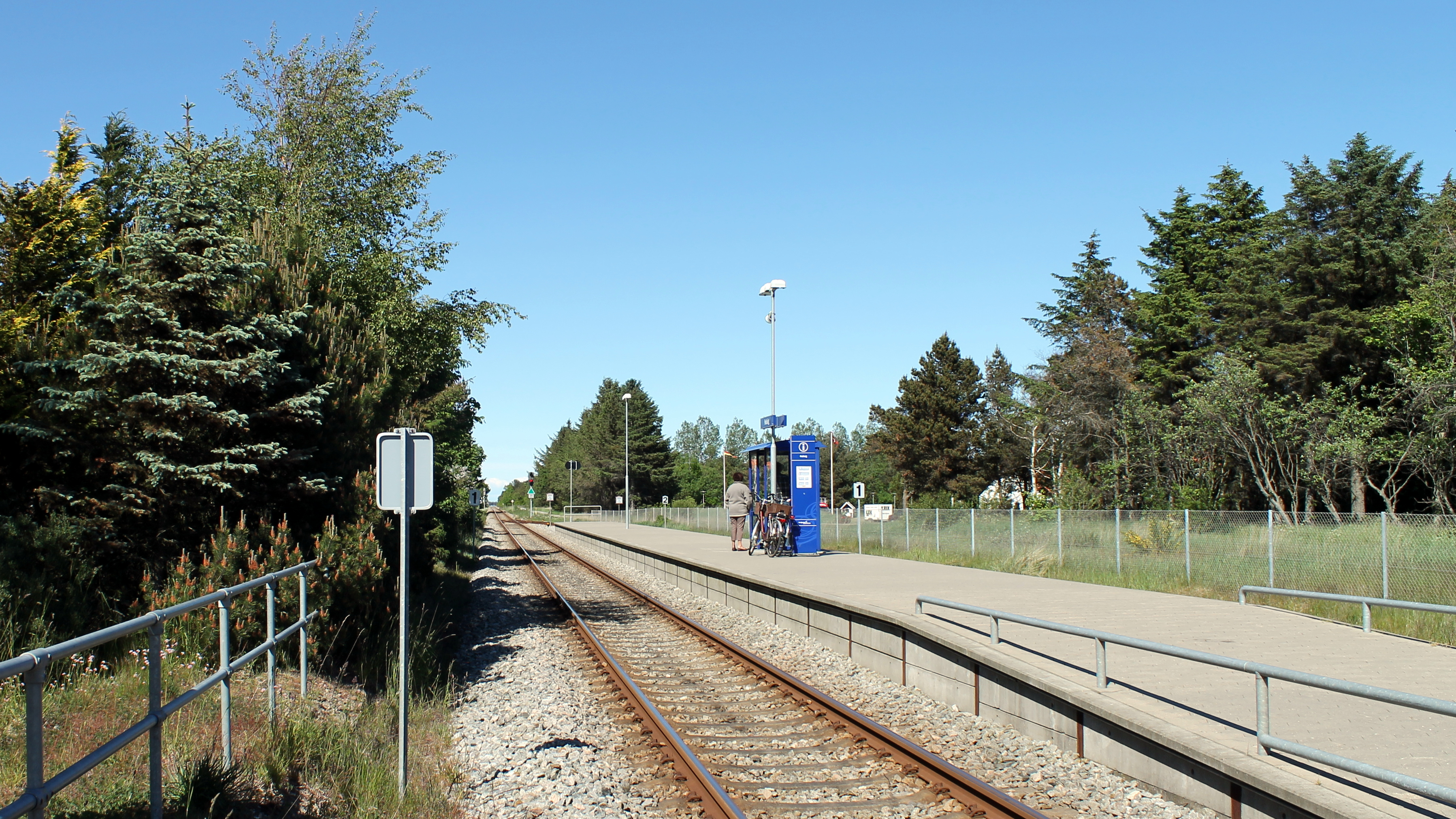
- Hulsig station in 2012

General information
- Location: Hulsigvej 10; Hulsig, 9990 Skagen; Frederikshavn Municipality; Denmark
- Coordinates: 57°39′34.27″N 10°27′47.72″E
- Elevation: 9.3 metres (31 ft)
- System: Railway station
- Owner: Nordjyske Jernbaner
- Line: Skagen Line
- Platforms: 1
- Tracks: 2
- Train operators: Nordjyske Jernbaner

History
- Opened: 24 July 1890; 136 years ago

Services
Preceding station	Nordjyske Jernbaner	Following station
Bunken towards Hobro	Hobro – Skagen Local train	Frederiks-havnsvej towards Skagen
Bunken towards Hjørring	Hjørring – Skagen Local train Peak hours	Frederiks-havnsvej towards Skagen
Location
- Location within Denmark Location within North Jutland Region

Hulsig railway station is a railway station located in the village of Hulsig south of Skagen in Vendsyssel, Denmark. The station serves the village of Hulsig as well as the nearby seaside resort of Kandestederne.

Hulsig station is located on the Skagensbanen railway line from Frederikshavn to Skagen between Frederikshavnsvej and Bunken railway halts. The station opened in 1890 where the railway line crossed the road to Kandestederne. The train services are currently operated by the railway company Nordjyske Jernbaner (NJ) which run frequent local train services between Skagen and Frederikshavn.

== History ==
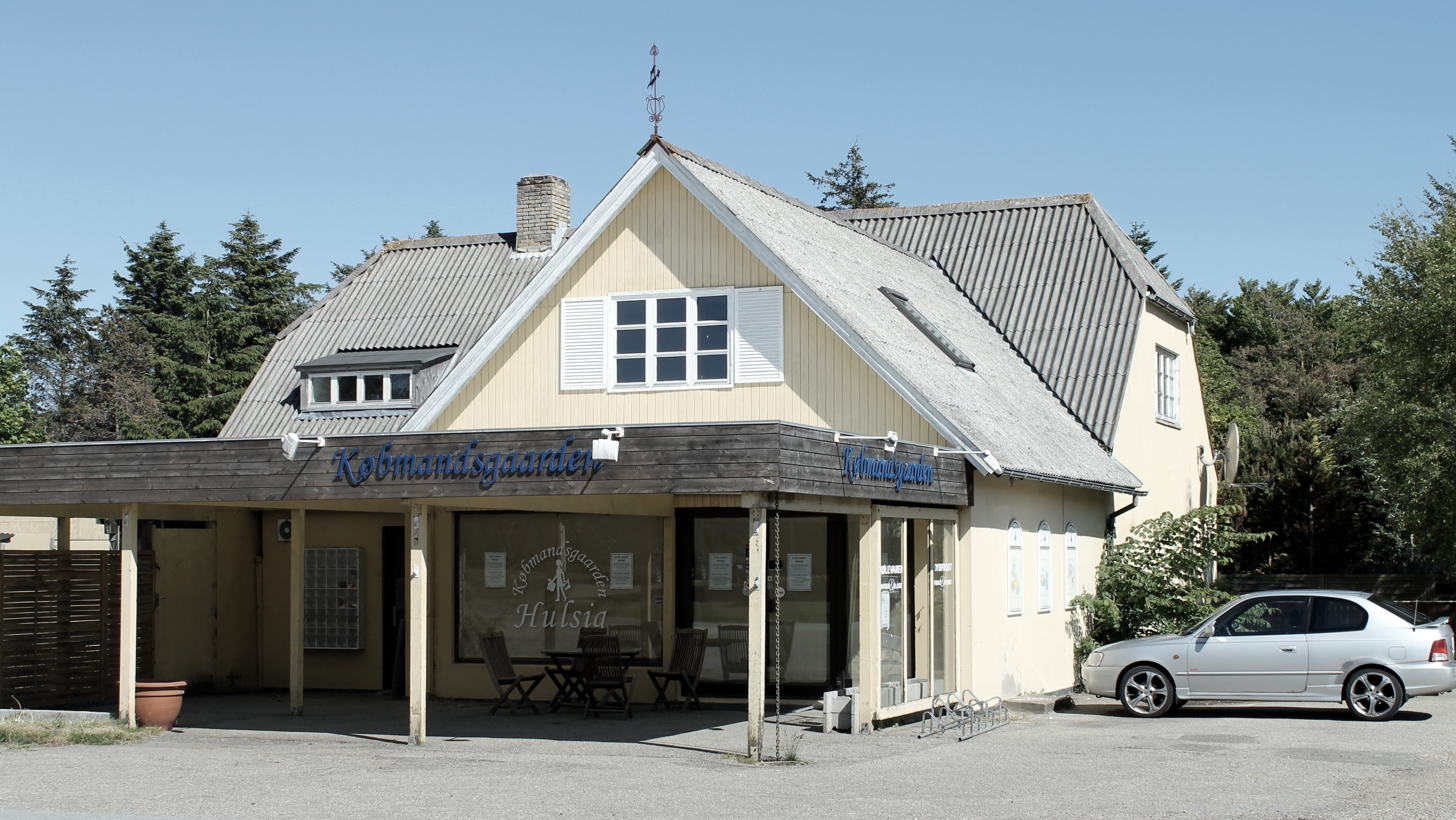
The former station building in 2012

The station was opened when the railway started in 1890. It was located near a small settlement where the railroad crossed the road to Kandestederne. The original station building was enlarged in 1921 based on designs by Ulrik Adolph Plesner.

In 1967, the station was set down to a halt. The former station building was sold in 1969.

== Operations ==
The train services are currently operated by the railway company Nordjyske Jernbaner (NJ) which run frequent local train services from Skagen station to Frederikshavn station with onward connections to the rest of Denmark.

== See also ==
- List of railway stations in Denmark
- Rail transport in Denmark
- History of rail transport in Denmark
