= Strandby railway station =

Railway station in Vendsyssel, Denmark

Strandby
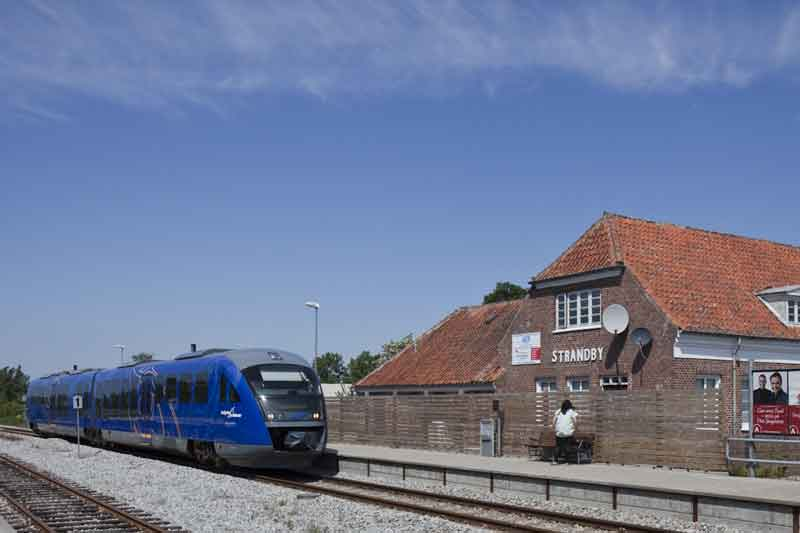
- Train arriving at Strandby station in 2009

General information
- Location: Jernbanevej 15; DK-9970 Strandby; Frederikshavn Municipality; Denmark
- Coordinates: 57°29′23″N 10°29′26″E
- Elevation: 4.8 metres (16 ft)
- Owner: Nordjyske Jernbaner
- Line: Skagen Line
- Platforms: 2 side platforms
- Tracks: 2
- Train operators: Nordjyske Jernbaner

Construction
- Architect: Ulrik Plesner
- Architectural style: Neoclassical

History
- Opened: 6 June 1924; 102 years ago

Services
Preceding station	Nordjyske Jernbaner	Following station
Frederikshavn towards Hobro	Hobro – Skagen Local train	Rimmen towards Skagen
Frederikshavn towards Hjørring	Hjørring – Skagen Local train Peak hours	Rimmen towards Skagen
Location
- Location within Denmark

Strandby station is a railway station serving the small coastal town of Strandby by the Ålbæk Bay in Vendsyssel, Denmark. The station is situated in the southwestern part of the town, c. 1 km (0.62 mi) from Strandby's busy fishing port.

Opened in 1924, the station is located on the Skagensbanen railway line from Skagen to Frederikshavn, between Rimmen railway halt and Frederikshavn station. The train services are currently operated by the railway company Nordjyske Jernbaner which run frequent local train services between Skagen station and Frederikshavn station.

== History ==
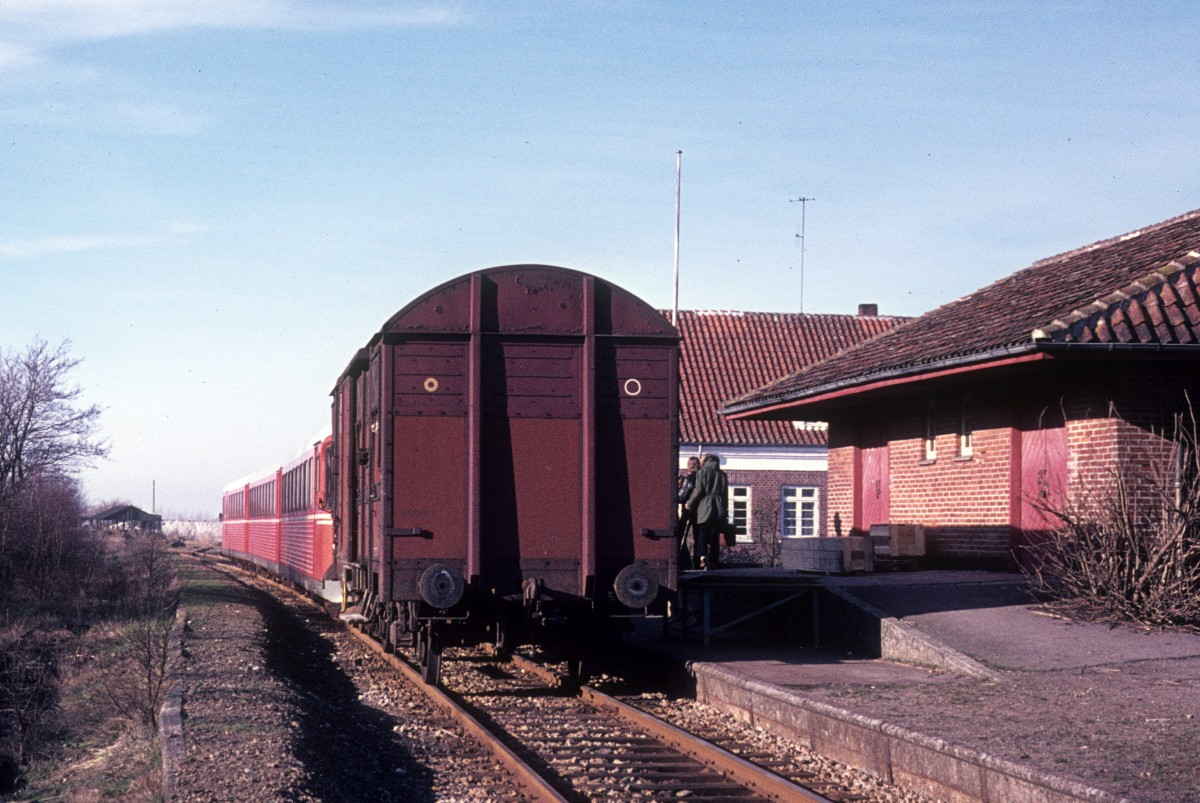
Strandby station in 1975

Strandby station was not one of the original stations on the Skagensbanen railway line which opened in 1890. The station opened on 6 June 1924 when the track gauge of Skagensbanen was converted from narrow gauge to standard gauge. As part of the conversion, the right-of-way between Frederikshavn and Jerup was changed so the railway line passed by the growing fishing port of Strandby instead of the smaller village of Elling further inland.

== Architecture ==
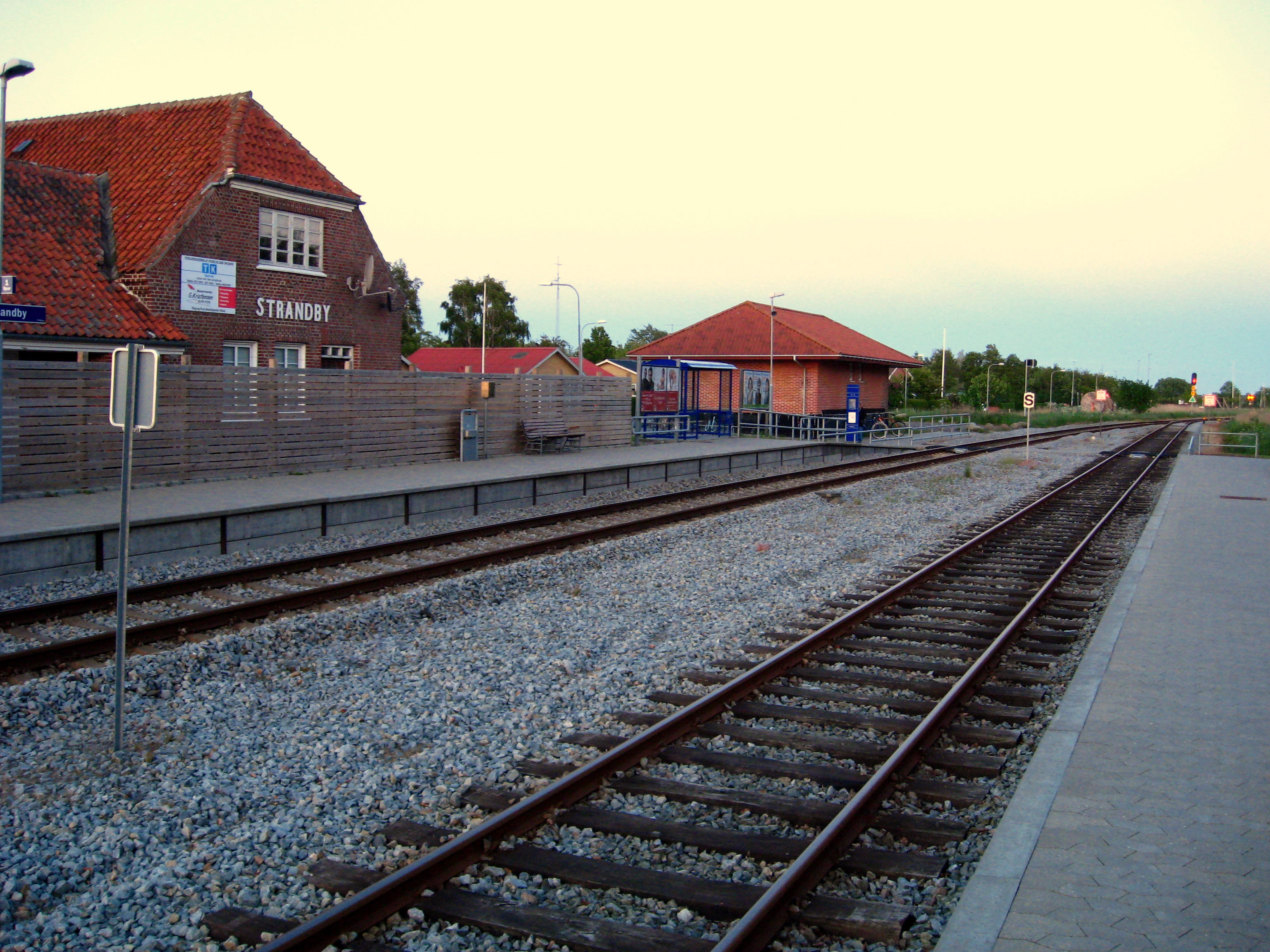
Strandby station in 2009

Strandby station's station building in Neoclassical style was built in 1922 to designs by the Danish architect Ulrik Plesner (1861–1931), known in particular for his influence on the architectural style practiced in Skagen and the surrounding area. The station building is constructed of red brick with a red tile roof.

In 2006, the station infrastructure was renovated with new platforms and a new shelter.

== Services ==
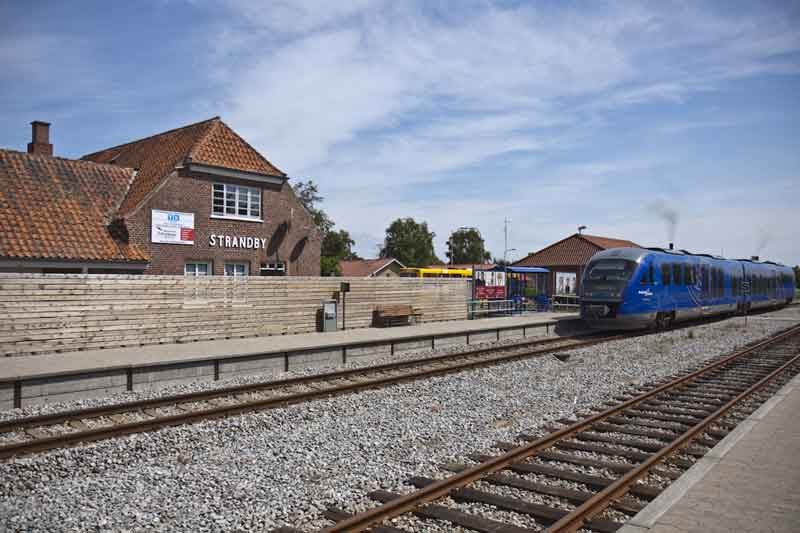
A DMU from Nordjyske Jernbaner calling at Strandby station in 2009.

The train services at the station are currently operated by the regional railway company Nordjyske Jernbaner (English: Railways of North Jutland) which operates in the North Jutland Region. Nordjyske Jernbaner runs a frequent local train service between Skagen and Frederikshavn with onward connections from Frederikshavn to Hjørring, Aalborg and the rest of Denmark.

== See also ==
- List of railway stations in Denmark
- Rail transport in Denmark
- History of rail transport in Denmark
