= Jerup railway station =

Railway station in Vendsyssel, Denmark

Jerup
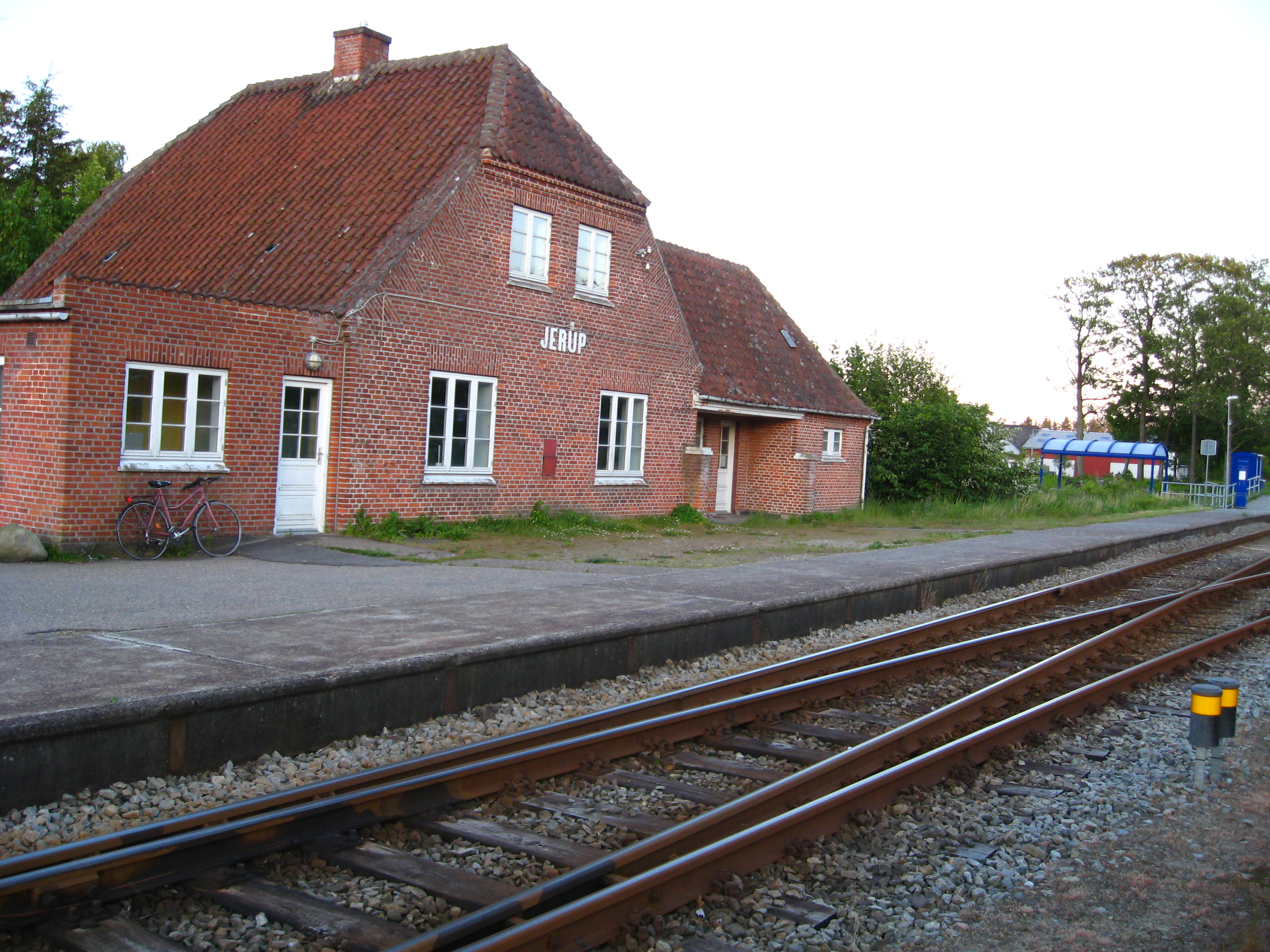
- Jerup station in 2009

General information
- Location: Søndergaardsvej 23; 9981 Jerup; Frederikshavn Municipality; Denmark
- Coordinates: 57°31′56.19″N 10°25′01.69″E
- Elevation: 4.0 metres (13.1 ft)
- Owner: Nordjyske Jernbaner
- Line: Skagen Line
- Platforms: 2
- Train operators: Nordjyske Jernbaner

History
- Opened: 1890

Services
| Preceding station | Nordjyske Jernbaner | Following station |
|---|---|---|
| Rimmen towards Hobro | Hobro – Skagen Local train | Napstjært towards Skagen |
| Rimmen towards Hjørring | Hjørring – Skagen Local train Peak hours | Napstjært towards Skagen |
Location
- Location within Denmark

Jerup railway station is a railway station serving the village of Jerup in Vendsyssel, Denmark.

The station is located on the Skagensbanen railway line from Skagen to Frederikshavn between Napstjært and Rimmen railway halts. The train services are currently operated by Nordjyske Jernbaner which run frequent local train services between Skagen station and Frederikshavn station.

== History ==
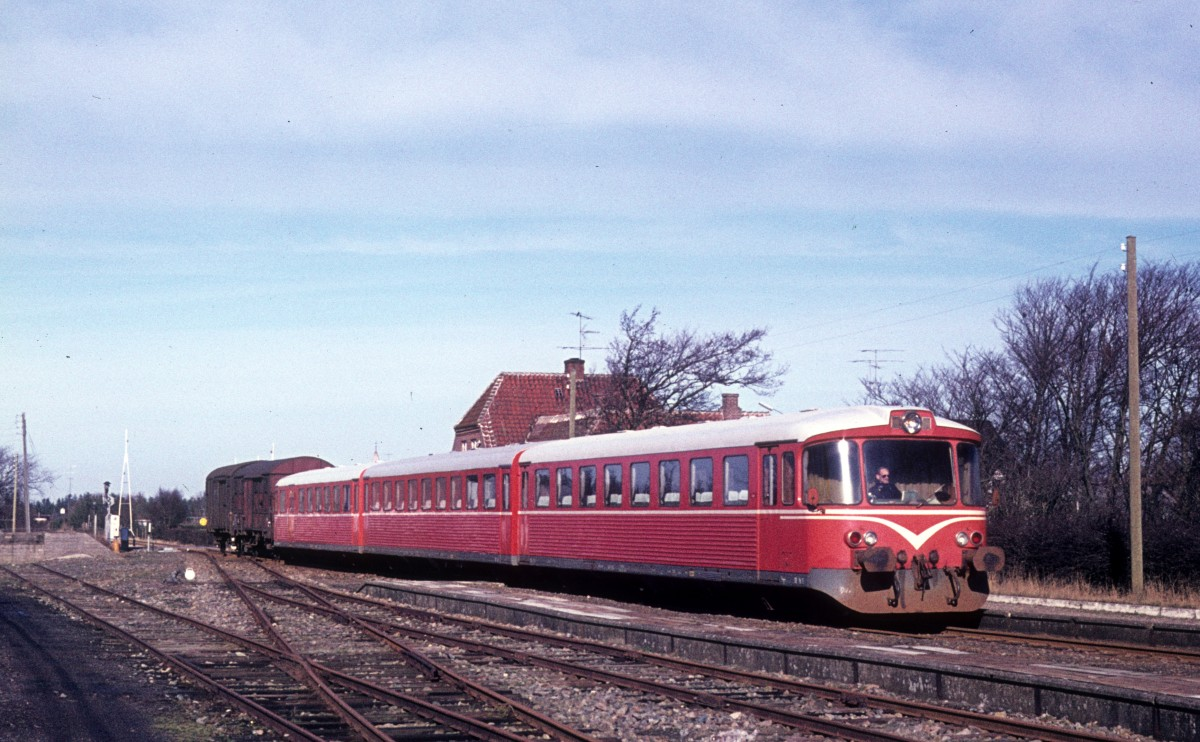
Jerup station in 1975

The station opened in 1890 when the railway started.

In 2006 the station was renovated with new platforms and a new shelter.

== Operations ==
The train services are currently operated by the railway company Nordjyske Jernbaner (NJ) which run frequent local train services from Skagen station to Frederikshavn station with onward connections to the rest of Denmark.

== Architecture ==
The original station building was heavily rebuilt in 1922 after designs by the Danish architect Ulrik Plesner.

== Cultural references ==
The station is used as a location in the 2010 film Min søsters børn vælter Nordjylland.

== See also ==
- List of railway stations in Denmark
