= Ålbæk railway station =

Railway station in Vendsyssel, Denmark

Ålbæk
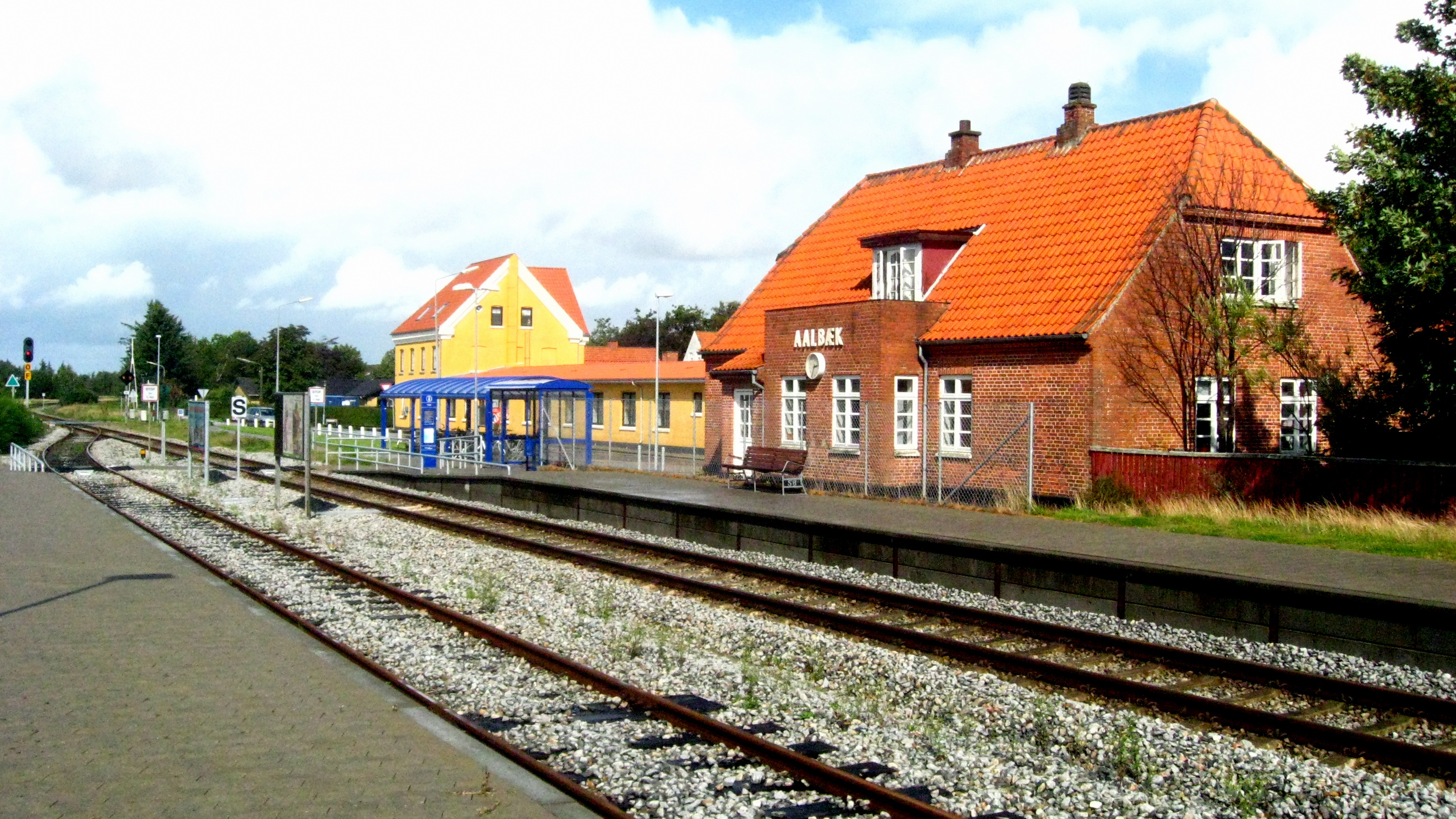
- Ålbæk station in 2009

General information
- Location: Stationsvej 21; 9982 Ålbæk; Frederikshavn Municipality; Denmark
- Coordinates: 57°35′33″N 10°24′30″E
- Elevation: 4.7 metres (15 ft)
- Owner: Nordjyske Jernbaner
- Operator: Nordjyske Jernbaner
- Line: Skagen Line
- Platforms: 2
- Train operators: Nordjyske Jernbaner

History
- Opened: July 25, 1890; 136 years ago

Services
Preceding station	Nordjyske Jernbaner	Following station
Napstjært towards Hobro	Hobro – Skagen Local train	Bunken towards Skagen
Napstjært towards Hjørring	Hjørring – Skagen Local train Peak hours	Bunken towards Skagen
Location
- Location within Denmark Location within North Jutland Region

Ålbæk railway station (alternative spelling: Aalbæk railway station) is a railway station serving the small coastal town of Ålbæk in Vendsyssel, Denmark.

Opened in 1890, the station is located on the Skagensbanen railway line from Skagen to Frederikshavn between Bunken and Napstjært halts. The train services are currently operated by Nordjyske Jernbaner which run frequent local train services between Skagen station and Frederikshavn station.

== History ==
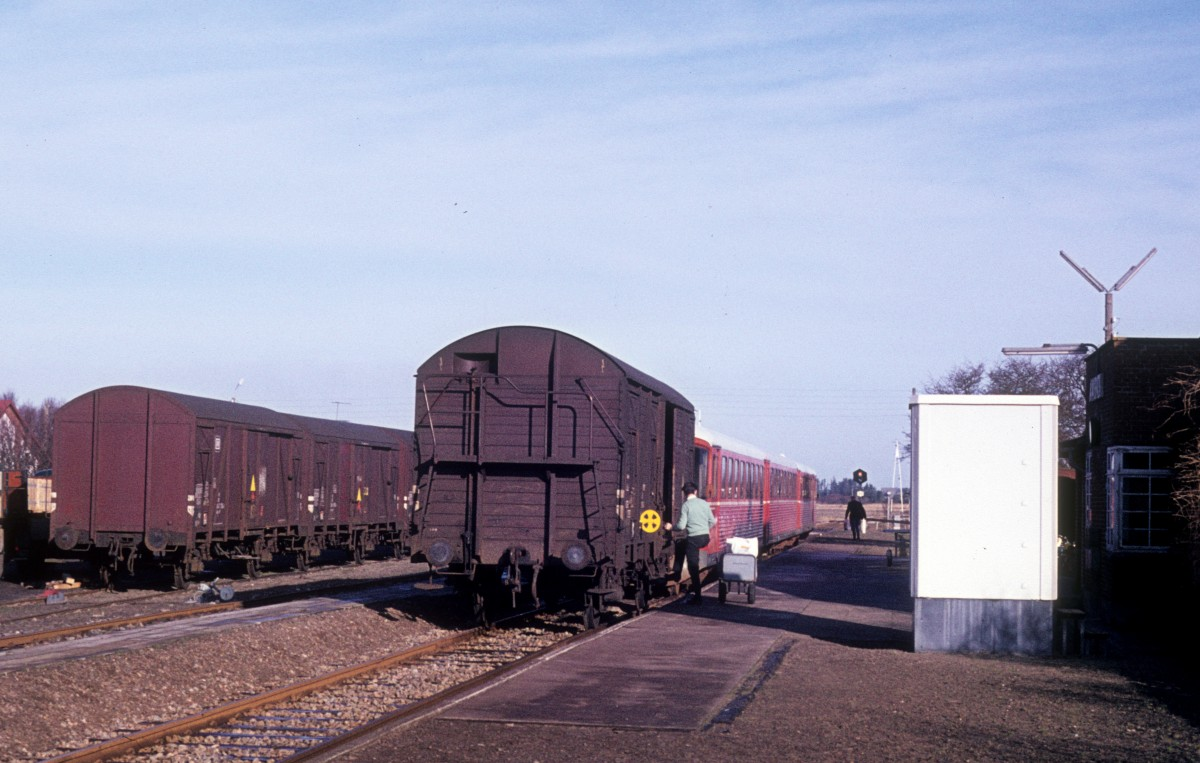
Ålbæk station in 1975

The station opened as one of the original intermediate stations of the Skagensbanen railway line which opened on 25 July 1890.

In 1915, the Danish Parliament agreed to build a new railway line between Ålbæk and Hjørring, but it was only the first part between Hjørring and Vellingshøj that was built. Instead, that railway was extended to Hirtshals and this is today the Hirtshalsbanen railway line.

== Architecture ==
The current station building was built in 1932–33. It was the last drawn by the architect Ulrik Plesner before his death.

== Operations ==
The train services are currently operated by the railway company Nordjyske Jernbaner (NJ) which run frequent local train services from Skagen station to Frederikshavn station with onward connections to the rest of Denmark.

== See also ==
- List of railway stations in Denmark
- Rail transport in Denmark
- Transport in Denmark
