= Rimmen railway halt =

Railway halt in Vendsyssel, Denmark

Rimmen
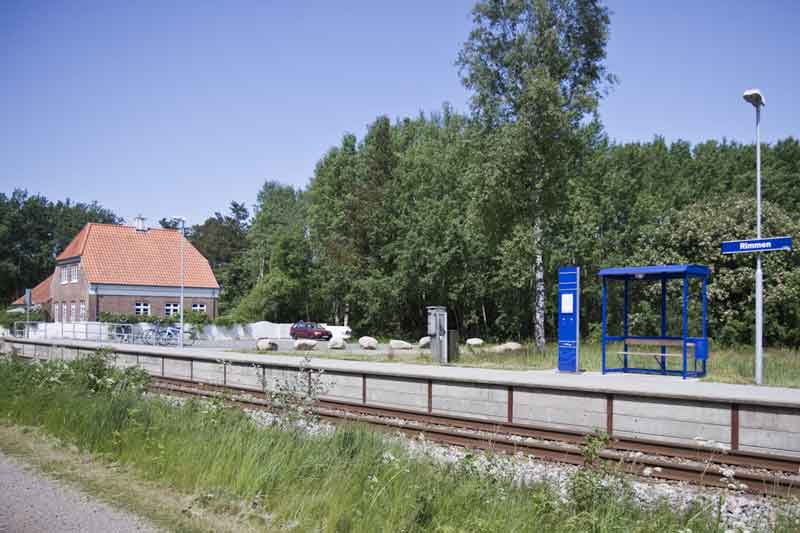
- Rimmen halt in 2009

General information
- Location: Skagensvej 341a Nielstrup, 9900 Frederikshavn; Frederikshavn Municipality; Denmark
- Coordinates: 57°30′17.73″N 10°26′42.36″E
- Elevation: 6.5 metres (21 ft)
- System: railway halt
- Owner: Nordjyske Jernbaner
- Line: Skagen Line
- Platforms: 1
- Train operators: Nordjyske Jernbaner

History
- Opened: 1890

Services
Preceding station	Nordjyske Jernbaner	Following station
Strandby towards Hobro	Hobro – Skagen Local train	Jerup towards Skagen
Strandby towards Hjørring	Hjørring – Skagen Local train Peak hours	Jerup towards Skagen
Location
- Location within Denmark Location within North Jutland Region

Rimmen railway halt (Danish: Rimmen Trinbræt) is a railway halt, located a short distance north of the village of Nielstrup north of Frederikshavn in Vendsyssel, Denmark.

The halt is located on the Skagensbanen railway line from Skagen to Frederikshavn between Jerup station and Strandby station. The train services are currently operated by Nordjyske Jernbaner which run frequent local train services between Skagen station and Frederikshavn station.

== History ==
The halt opened in 1890 when the railway started. In 2008 the halt was renovated with a new platform and a new shelter.

== See also ==
- List of railway stations in Denmark
