= Inger Andersen (environmentalist) =

Danish economist and environmentalist (born 1958)

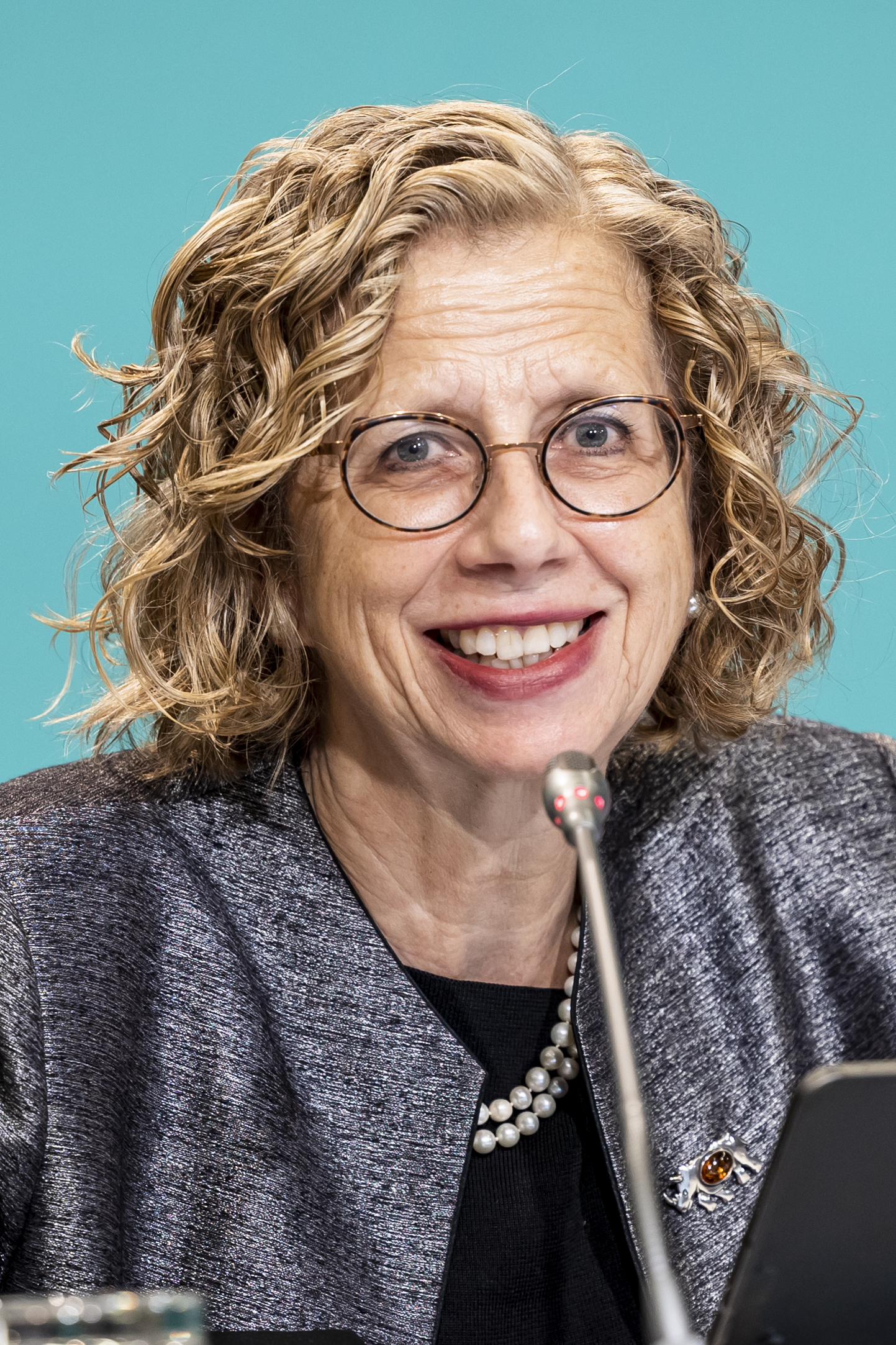
- Andersen in 2022

Executive Director of the United Nations Environment Programme
- Incumbent
- Assumed office 19 July 2019
- Secretary-General: António Guterres
- Preceded by: Joyce Msuya (Acting)

Director General of the International Union for Conservation of Nature
- In office 12 January 2015 – 19 July 2019
- President: Zhang Xinsheng
- Preceded by: Julia Marton-Lefèvre
- Succeeded by: Grethel Aguilar

Vice President of the World Bank for the Middle East and North Africa
- In office 2011–2015
- President: Jim Yong Kim; Robert Zoellick
- Preceded by: Shamshad Akhtar
- Succeeded by: Hafez Ghanem

Vice President of the World Bank for Sustainable Development
- In office 2010–2011
- President: Robert Zoellick
- Succeeded by: Rachel Kyte

Personal details
- Born: Inger la Cour Andersen; 23 May 1958 (age 68) Jerup, Denmark
- Education: London Metropolitan University and School of Oriental and African Studies
- Website: Official biography

Inger Andersen (born 23 May 1958) is a Danish economist and environmentalist. In February 2019, she was appointed as the executive director of the United Nations Environment Programme.

Prior to her appointment, at UNEP, Andersen was Director General of the International Union for Conservation of Nature (IUCN), Vice President for Sustainable Development at the World Bank and Head of the CGIAR Fund Council and then World Bank Vice President for the Middle East and North Africa.

== Family, early life and education ==
Inger Andersen is the daughter of Aagot la Cour Andersen and Erik Andersen. She is the granddaughter of Danish historian and archaeologist Vilhelm la Cour. Her brother was Hans la Cour, author and film maker, known in the world of sail sport and environmental documentaries.

Andersen was born in Jerup, Denmark. She graduated from Midtfyns Gymnasium secondary school in 1977. Andersen obtained a BA in 1981 from the Polytechnic of North London (now London Metropolitan University) and in 1982 gained an MA degree from the School of Oriental and African Studies at University of London, with a specialization in development studies focusing on economics and development.

== Career ==
Andersen started her career in Sudan in 1982 where she worked initially as an English teacher under the UK funded English teachers programme. In 1985 she joined SudanAid, the development and relief arm of the Sudan Catholic Bishops' Conference. Her work focused on famine, drought relief, and rehabilitation.

=== United Nations ===
Andersen worked at the United Nations in New York for 12 years at the UN Sudano-Sahelian Office (UNSO), (now the Global Policy Centre on Resilient Ecosystems and Desertification based in Nairobi) where she worked on drought and desertification issues. In 1992, she was appointed the Global Environment Facility Coordinator for MENA at UNDP, where she oversaw the global environment portfolio in 22 Arab countries.

=== World Bank ===
Andersen joined the World Bank in 1999 as Coordinator of the UNDP-World Bank International Waters Partnership between 1999 and 2001 In the following years she worked in various roles, focusing on water, environment, and sustainable development, with the Middle East and North Africa as her main area of work.

From 2010 until 2011, Andersen served as the World Bank's vice president for Sustainable Development and Head of the CGIAR Fund Council. During her tenure she oversaw the creation of the CGIAR Fund Council and the CGIAR Consortium. As Vice President for Sustainable Development, Andersen profiled a number of World Bank priorities, including: agricultural productivity and enhancing food security; infrastructure investment; climate change resilience; green growth; social accountability; disaster risk management; and culture and development.

During her tenure as Sector Director, she oversaw the scaling-up of the World Bank's analytical and investment support to underpin resilient infrastructure development for access to energy, water, and transport as well as investments in the agriculture and environment sectors. She placed special emphasis on the need to relieve climate and water stress in the region, both of which she argued pose key threats to peace and stability.

Andersen co-chaired the 2012 international donor meeting for Yemen Riyadh with the then Finance Minister of Saudi Arabia, Ibrahim Abdulaziz Al-Assaf. As Vice President for MENA, Andersen was also outspoken on the humanitarian consequences of the war in Gaza in 2014, and called for access to imports and freedom of movement in Gaza and the West Bank, while stressing the imperative of mutual assurance of security in both Palestinian territories and Israel. In 2011, Andersen represented the World Bank in the G8/G7 Finance Minister's Deauville meetings which sought to provide additional support to the Arab Region.

=== International Union for Conservation of Nature ===
Andersen was appointed Director General of the International Union for Conservation of Nature (IUCN) in January 2015. As Director General, Andersen was responsible for IUCN's operations in its 50 plus offices worldwide

Under Andersen's leadership, IUCN held its 2016 World Conservation Congress in Hawaii, United States. The 2016 Congress was the largest international conservation event held in the United States. It was opened by President Barack Obama on the eve of the formal opening

During Andersen's tenure at IUCN she emphasized the importance of nature conservation in efforts to achieve sustainable development. "Nature is not an obstacle to human aspirations, but an essential partner, offering valuable contributions towards all our endeavours."

=== UNEP ===
On 21 February 2019, the General Assembly of the United Nations elected Andersen as executive director of the United Nations Environment Programme (UNEP). She was appointed for a four-year term. On 18 January 2023, the General Assembly confirmed Andersen would serve for a further four-year term, through 14 June 2027.

== Other activities ==
=== International organizations ===
- United Nations Global Compact, Member of the Board
- United Nations Environment Programme (UNEP), Member of the Financial Inquiry Advisory Committee

=== Corporate boards ===
- Nespresso, Member of the Sustainability Advisory Board (NSAB)

=== Non-profit organizations ===
- Sustainable Development Solutions Network (SDSN), Member of the High-level Leadership Council
- Sustainable Energy for All (SE4All), Member of the Advisory Board
- The Economics of Ecosystems and Biodiversity (TEEB), Member of the Advisory Board
- World Economic Forum (WEF), Global Agenda Trustee for Environment and Natural Resource Security
- 2030 Water Resources Group, Member of the Governing Council and Steering Board
- Eco Forum Global, Member of the International Advisory Council (EFG-IAC)
- International Gender Champions (IGC), Member
- International Olympic Committee (IOC), Member of the Sustainability and Legacy Commission

== Selected publications ==
- Andersen, I., and George Golitzen, K., eds. The Niger river basin: A vision for sustainable management. World Bank Publications, 2005.
- Prof Wolf T., Aaron eds, 'Sharing Water, Sharing Benefits: Working towards effective transboundary water resources management: A graduate/professional skills-building workbook', UNESCO Oregon State University. 2010.
- Gladstone, W. et al. Sustainable Use of Renewable Resources and Conservation in the Red Sea and Gulf of Aden, Elsevier, Vol 42. 1999.
- Andersen, I. Healthy Oceans: The Cornerstone for A Sustainable Future, Impakter.com. 2017

== Honors and awards ==
- International Road Federation 2013 Professional of the Year
- Tufts University Dr. Jean Mayer Award 2014
