= Rimmen =

Rimmen may refer to:

- Anne Rimmen (born 1981), Norwegian television presenter
- Rimmen railway halt, railway station in Denmark
