= Frederikshavnsvej railway halt =

Railway halt in Skagen, Denmark

Frederikshavnsvej
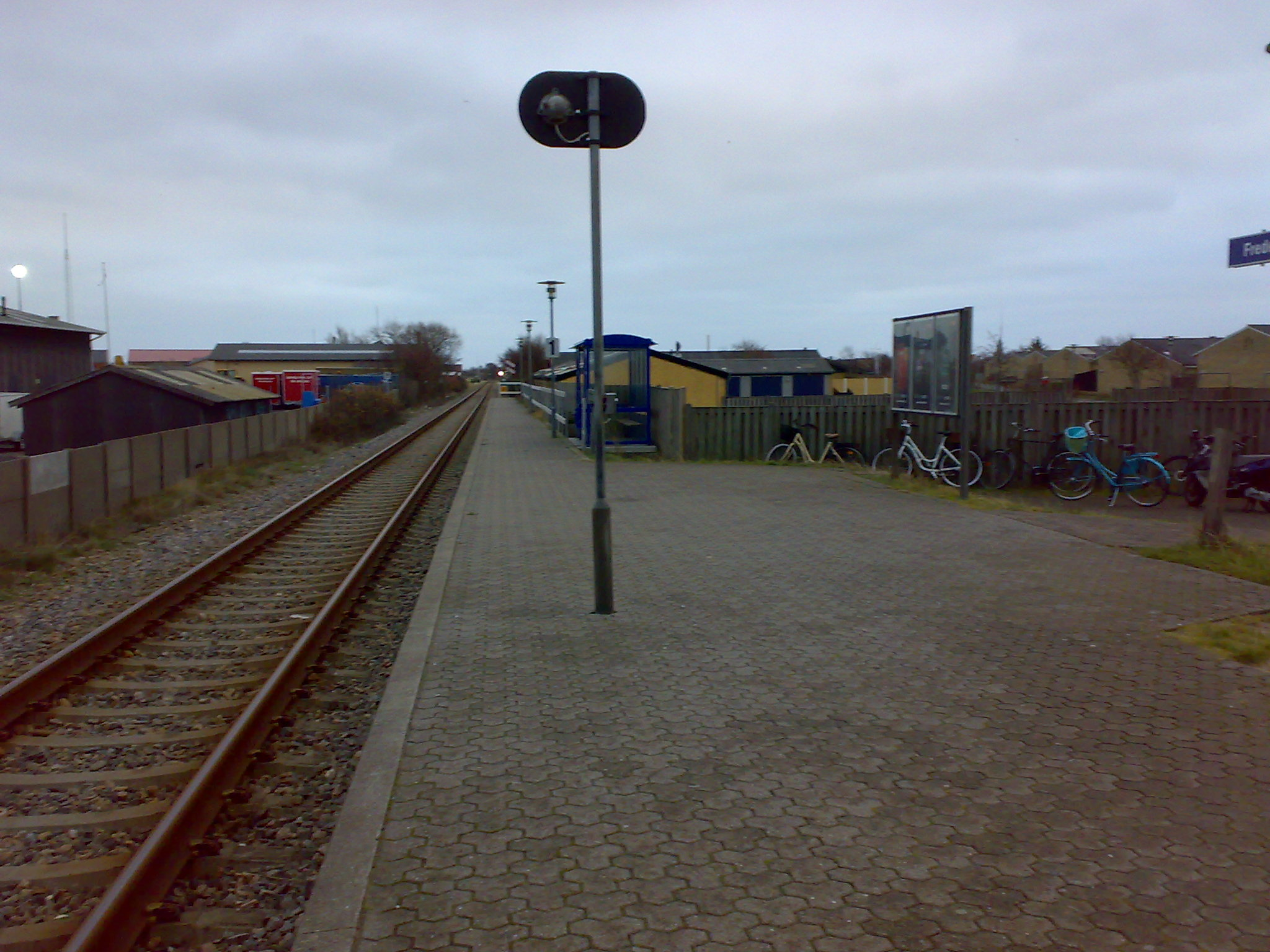
- Frederikshavnsvej halt in 2008

General information
- Location: Frederikshavnsvej 60; 9990 Skagen; Frederikshavn Municipality; Denmark
- Coordinates: 57°43′28.85″N 10°33′49.57″E
- Elevation: 3.3 metres (11 ft)
- Owner: Nordjyske Jernbaner
- Line: Skagen Line
- Platforms: 1
- Tracks: 1
- Train operators: Nordjyske Jernbaner

History
- Opened: 1992

Services
Preceding station	Nordjyske Jernbaner	Following station
Hulsig towards Hobro	Hobro – Skagen Local train	Skagen Terminus
Hulsig towards Hjørring	Hjørring – Skagen Local train Peak hours	Skagen Terminus
Location
- Location within Denmark

Frederikshavnsvej railway halt (Danish: Frederikshavnsvej Trinbræt) is a railway halt serving the town of Skagen in Vendsyssel, Denmark. The halt is situated in the western part of the town, where the railway line crosses the highway between Skagen and Frederikshavn.

The halt is located on the Skagensbanen railway line from Skagen to Frederikshavn between Skagen station and Hulsig station. The stop was opened in 1992, primarily for the many student commuters who travel daily between Skagen and Frederikshavn. The train services are currently operated by the railway company Nordjyske Jernbaner which run frequent local train services between Skagen and Frederikshavn with onward connections by train to the rest of Denmark.

== See also ==
- List of railway stations in Denmark
