= Ingeborg Buhl =

Danish fencer

Personal information
- Born: 15 January 1880 Ålbæk, Region Nordjylland, Denmark
- Died: 13 August 1963 (aged 83)

Sport
- Sport: Fencing

Ingeborg Buhl (15 January 1880 – 13 August 1963) was a Danish fencer. She competed in the women's foil competition at the 1924 Summer Olympics.
