= Jerup =

- Village
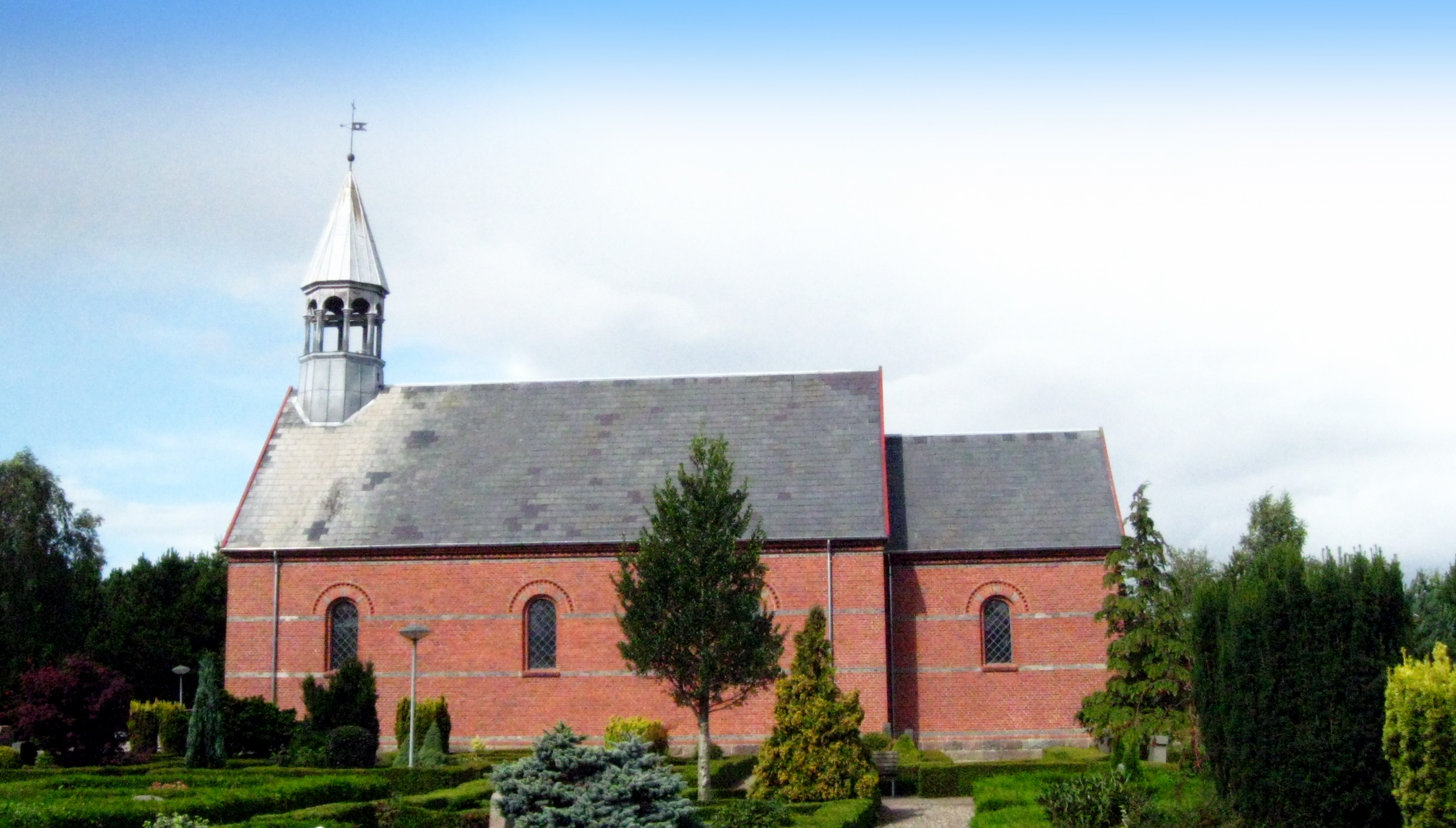
- Jerup Church in 2009

- Location in North Jutland Region Jerup (Denmark)
- Coordinates: 57°32′6″N 10°25′1″E
- Country: Denmark
- region: North Jutland Region
- Municipality: Frederikshavn

Population (2026)
  - Total: 514

Jerup is a village, with a population of 514 (1. January 2026). in Frederikshavn Municipality, Vendsyssel, in northern Jutland in Denmark.

Jerup is served by Jerup railway station, located on the Skagensbanen railway line.

== Notable people ==
- Inger Andersen (born 1958 in Jerup) a Danish economist and environmentalist; the Executive Director of the United Nations Environment Programme, UNEP
