= Skagen Line =

Railway line in North Jutland, Denmark

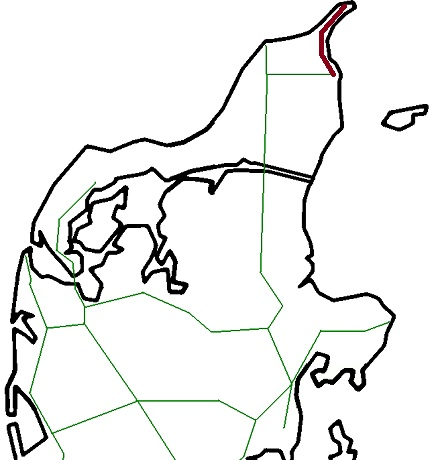

Overview
- Native name: Skagensbanen
- Owner: Nordjyske Jernbaner
- Termini: Skagen 57.7239°N 10.5921°E; Frederikshavn 57.4412°N 10.5400°E
- Stations: 10

Service
- Type: Railway
- System: Danish railways
- Operator(s): Nordjyske Jernbaner
- Rolling stock: Siemens Desiro

History
- Opened: 24 July 1890

Technical
- Line length: 39.7 km (24.7 mi)
- Number of tracks: 1
- Character: Local railway
- Track gauge: 1,435 mm (4 ft 8 1/2 in)
- Electrification: No
- Operating speed: 100 km/h (62 mph) (Frederikshavn–Hulsig); 120 km/h (75 mph) (Hulsig–Skagen)
Route map
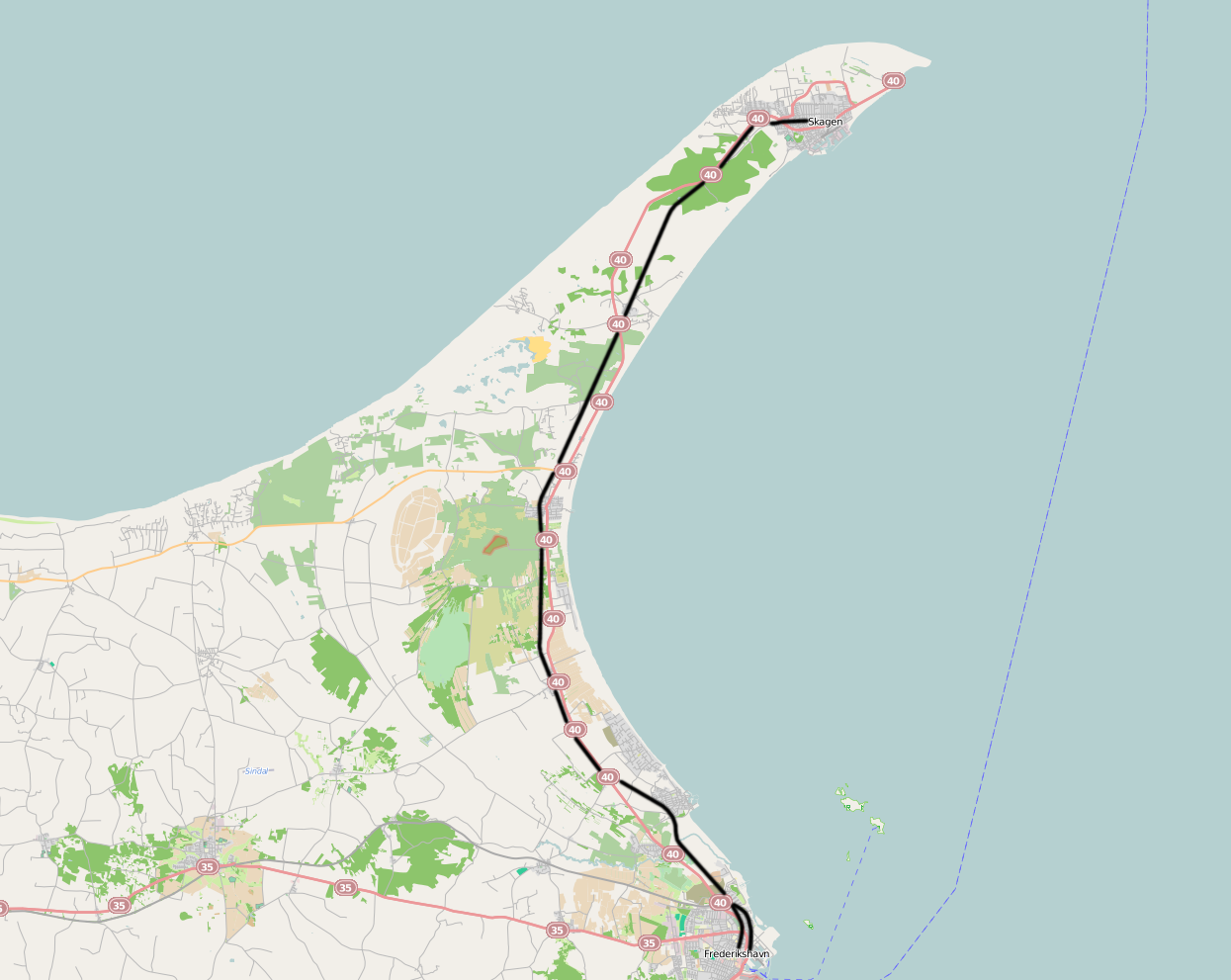

The Skagen railway line (Danish: Skagensbanen) is a 39.7 km (24.7 mi) long standard gauge single track railway line between Skagen and Frederikshavn in Vendsyssel, Denmark. The railway links the fishing port and seaside resort of Skagen with the Danish rail network.

The railway line opened as a narrow gauge railway in 1890 and was converted to standard gauge in 1924. It is currently owned and operated by the railway company Nordjyske Jernbaner (NJ) which runs frequent local train services from Skagen station to Frederikshavn station with onward connections from Frederikshavn to the rest of Denmark.

== History ==
Work on the railway line started on 26 July 1889, and was completed on 16 March 1890. It was opened on 24 July 1890 in the presence of King Christian IX, Crown Prince Frederik, and the Interior Minister Hans Peter Ingerslev. Operations on the line commenced the following day with two trains daily in each direction.

Until 1924 it was a narrow gauge railway, with a maximum speed of 30 km/h (19 mph). In 1924 the railway line was converted to standard gauge to avoid the need to transfer cargoes of fish in Frederikshavn. As a consequence of the conversion, the layout of Skagen station was extensively changed. As part of the conversion, the right-of-way between Frederikshavn and Rimmen halt was changed so the railway line passed by the coastal town of Strandby instead of the inland village of Elling.

In 2001, the operating company Skagensbanen A/S (SB) merged with Hjørring Privatbaner A/S (HP) to form the railway company Nordjyske Jernbaner (NJ). With headquarters in Hjørring, the company is now responsible for running the Hjørring–Hirtshals and Frederikshavn–Skagen lines.

In 2005 the current Siemens Desiro was introduced. The maximum speed is 100 km/h (62 mph) between Frederikshavn and Hulsig and between Skagen and Hulsig the maximum speed is 120 km/h (75 mph).

== Route ==
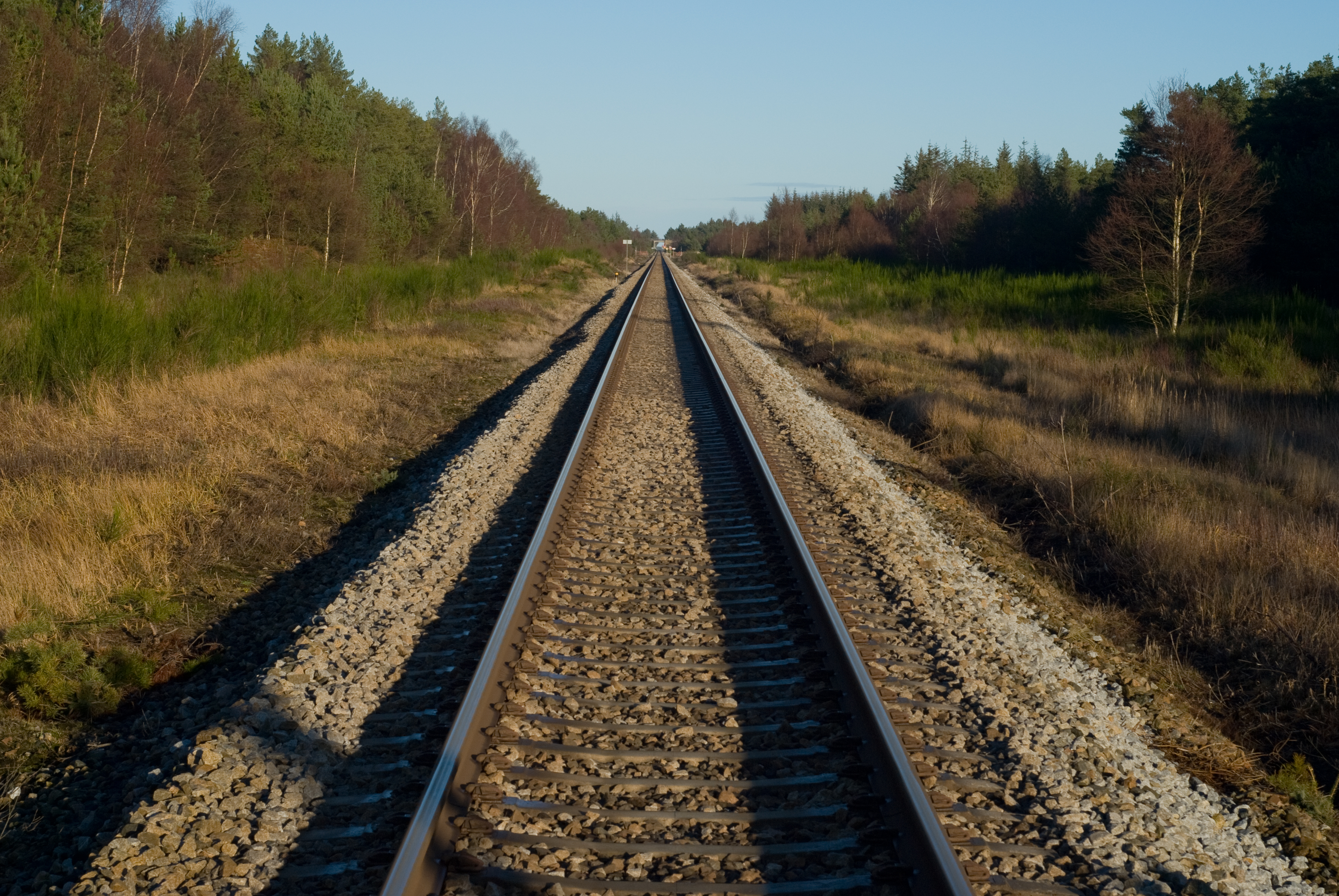
Skagensbanen rail tracks at Bunken Plantation

The Skagen line runs north from Frederikshavn, following the tracks of the Vendsyssel Line out of the city. As the Vendsyssel Line branches west towards Hjørring, the Skagen Line continues north following the curve of the coast line of the Ålbæk Bay, serving the towns of Strandby, Jerup and Ålbæk. From Ålbæk the line continues north, passing through Bunken Plantation, Hulsig Heath and Skagen Plantation before passing through the western part of Skagen to reach its terminus in central Skagen.

== Operations ==
=== Local trains ===
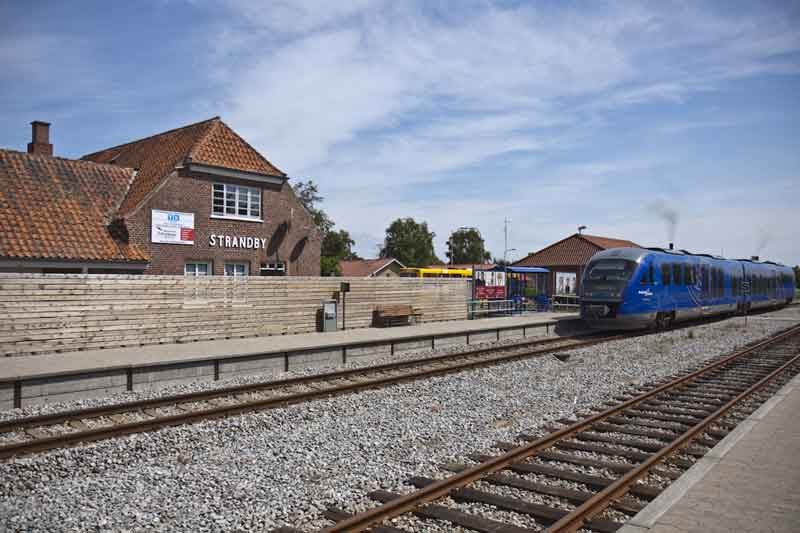
A Nordjyske Jernbaner Siemens Desiro DMU at Strandby station in June 2009

The railway company Nordjyske Jernbaner (NJ) operating in the North Jutland Region runs frequent local train services from Skagen station to Frederikshavn station with onward connections from Frederikshavn to Aalborg and the rest of Denmark.

=== InterCity service ===
For a period in the 1990s there were direct InterCity connections between Copenhagen and Skagen, operated by DSB.

=== Bus services ===
In 2005, NJ replaced the bus connections between Skagen and Frederikshavn with more frequent train connections.

== Stations ==
| Station | Distance from Frederikshavn (km) | Distance from Skagen (km) | Remarks |
|---|---|---|---|
| Skagen | 38.8 | 0 | |
| Frederikshavnsvej | 38.0 | 0.8 | opened in 1992 |
| Hulsig | 28.0 | 10.8 | |
| Bunken | 24.5 | 14.3 | |
| Ålbæk | 19.8 | 19.0 | |
| Napstjært | 15.6 | 23.2 | |
| Jerup | 13.0 | 25.8 | |
| Rimmen | 9.5 | 29.3 | |
| Strandby | 6.3 | 32.5 | |
| Frederikshavn | 0 | 38.8 | |

=== Previous stations ===
- Højen station — between Frederikshavnsvej Halt and Hulsig Station.
- Sandmilen halt — between Højen Station and Hulsig Station
- Elling station — between Rimmen Halt and Frederikshavn Station.
- Apholmen halt — between Strandby Station and Frederikshavn Station.

== See also ==
- List of railway lines in Denmark
- List of gauge conversions
- Hirtshals railway line
