= Zhang Xinsheng =

Chinese politician

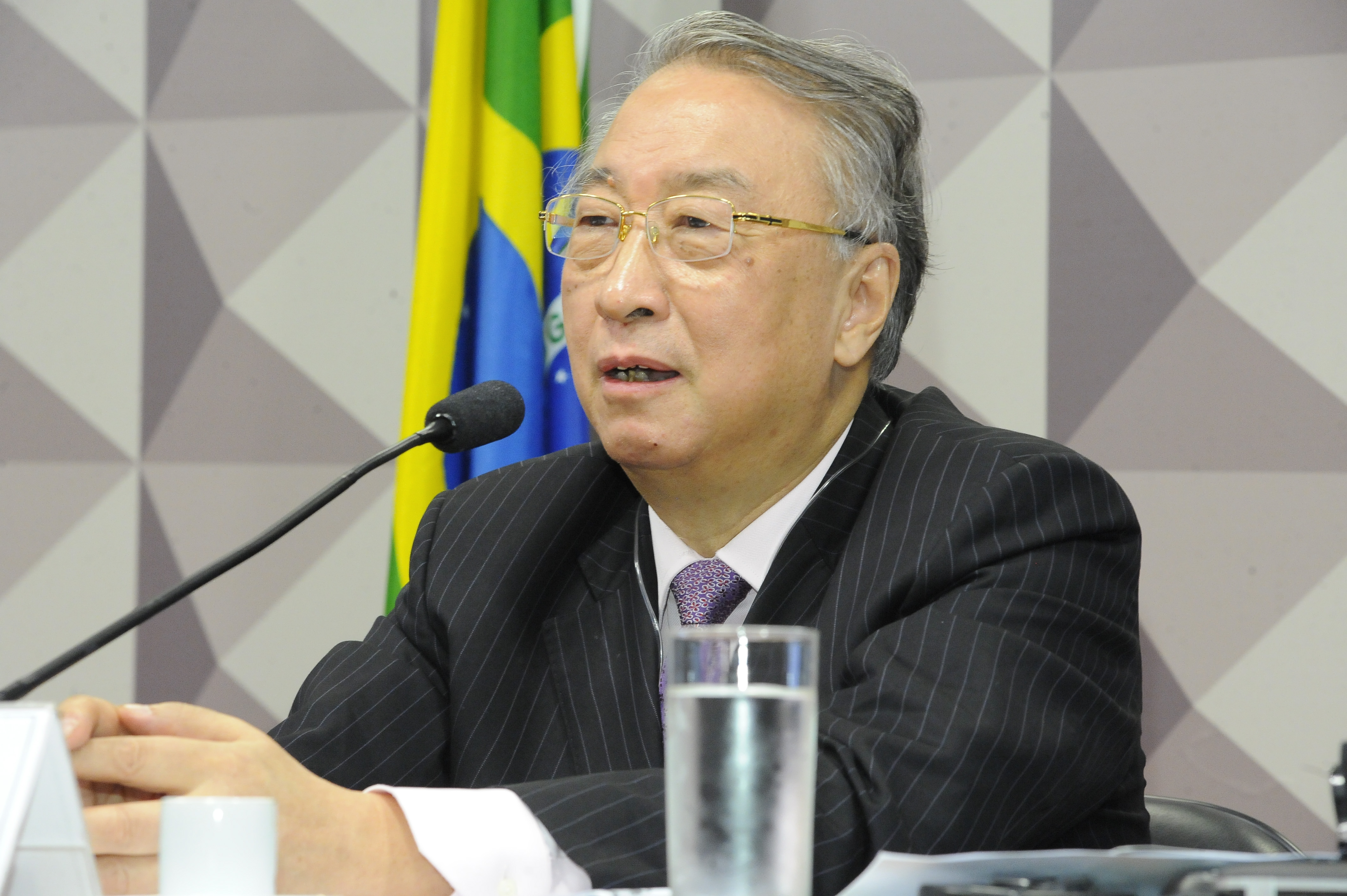
Zhang Xinsheng in 2017

Zhang Xinsheng (Chinese: 章新胜), is a Chinese politician. He is the former vice minister of the Ministry of Education of the People's Republic of China, the vice president of the Chinese Olympic Committee and the president and former president of the International Union for Conservation of Nature.

== Biography ==
Zhang was born in Shuyang County, Suqian, Jiangsu Province in November, 1948.

1974–1977, Zhang studied English and literature at the Department of Foreign Languages of Hangzhou University (previous and current Zhejiang University). 1977–1979, he served as an official and translator (English-Chinese) in the Foreign Affairs Office of the Jiangsu Provincial Government.

1980–1982, Zhang studied at the University of Colorado Boulder in the United States as a graduate student. 1982–1985, he was the deputy director of the Tourism Bureau of the Jiangsu Provincial Government. 1986–1989, he was the deputy director of the National Tourism Administration, PRC.

1989–1997, he served as the Mayor of Suzhou City. 1998–2000, he was a graduate student at the Harvard University USA, and received a master's degree (major in city planning). 2001–present, he is the Vice-Minister of the Ministry of Education, PRC. 2004–present, he is the vice-president of the Chinese Olympic Committee, Beijing.

On 24 Oct 2005, Zhang became the Chairman of UNESCO’s Executive Board. In 2007, Zhang was re-elected as the vice-president of FISU (International University Sports Federation). In 2012, he was elected President of IUCN, the International Union for Conservation of Nature.
