= Ålbæk =

- Town
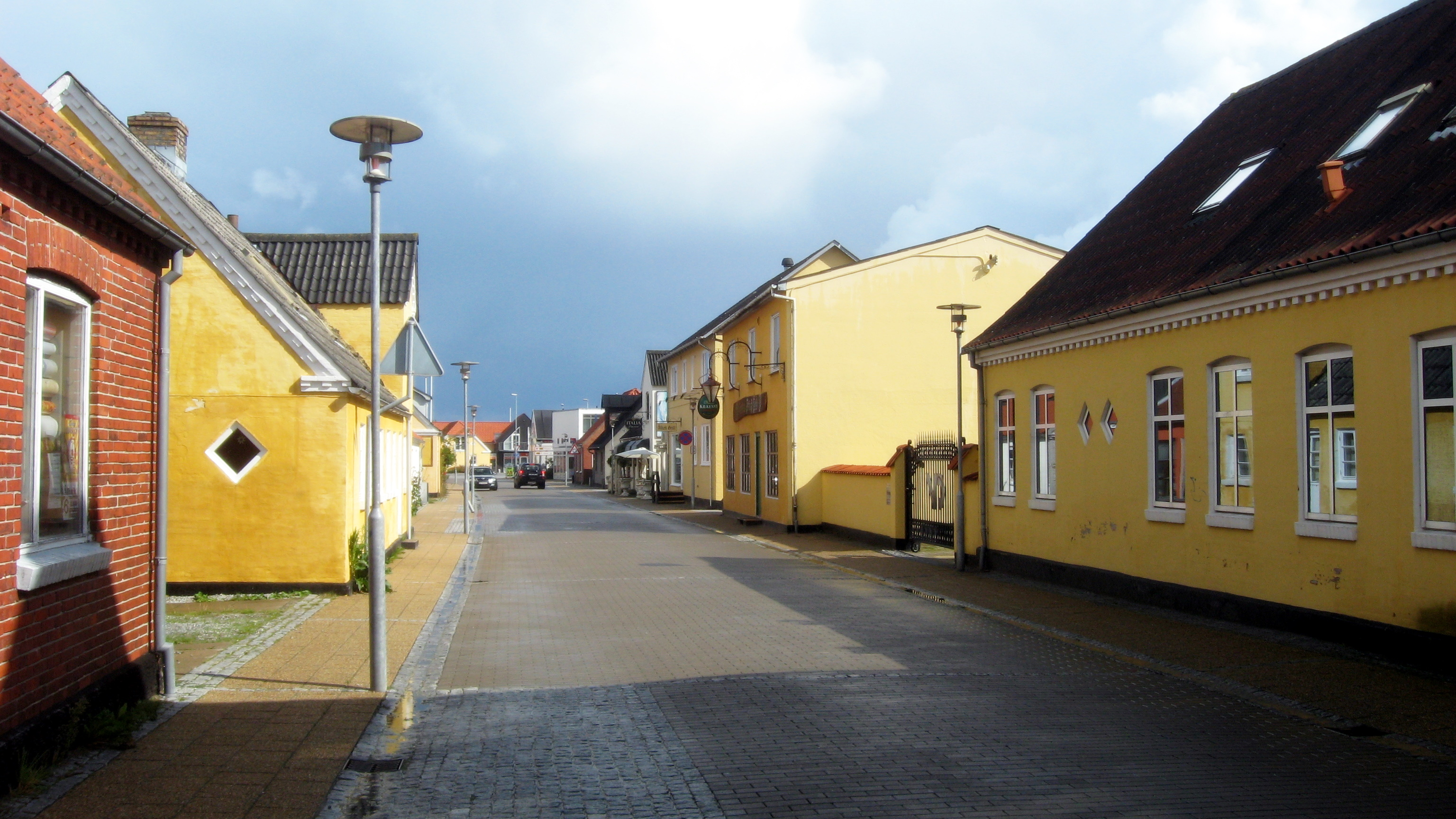
- Ålbæk in 2009

- Location in Denmark Ålbæk (North Jutland Region)
- Coordinates: 57°35′32″N 10°24′29″E
- Country: Denmark
- Region: Region Nordjylland
- Municipality: Frederikshavn

Area
  - Urban: 1.64 km^{2} (0.63 sq mi)

Population (2026)
  - Urban: 1,379
  - Urban density: 841/km^{2} (2,180/sq mi)
- Time zone: UTC+1 (CET)
  - Summer (DST): UTC+2 (CEST)
- Postal code: DK-9982 Ålbæk

Ålbæk (alternative spelling: Aalbæk) is a small coastal town in Vendsyssel, Denmark. The town has a population of 1,379 (1 January 2026).

Ålbæk is situated by the Ålbæk Bay in the northern part of the Kattegat sea area. The town is located halfway between the towns of Frederikshavn and Skagen. It is located in Frederikshavn Municipality in the North Jutland Region of Denmark.

Ålbæk is served by Ålbæk railway station, located on the Skagen railway line. It is on Danish national road 40, which connects Frederikshavn and Skagen. Secondary road 597 connects the town with Hirtshals on the western side of the peninsula.

== Notable people ==
- Ingeborg Buhl (1880 in Ålbæk – 1963) a Danish fencer, competed the 1924 Summer Olympics
