= Ulrik Plesner =

Danish architect

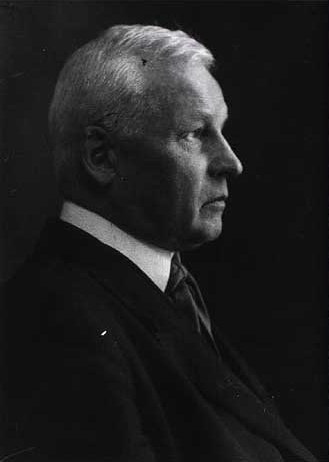
Ulrik Plesner

Ulrik Adolph Plesner (17 May 1861 in Vedersø – 22 November 1933 in Skagen), usually known as Ulrik Plesner, was an innovative Danish architect who designed in a National Romantic style at the beginning of the 20th century. He is remembered in particular for his influence on the style of architecture practiced in Skagen in the north of Jutland.

== Early life ==
Born in Vedersø near Ringkøbing on the west coast of Jutland, he was the son of parish priest J.F. Plesner. After attending the Copenhagen Technical School (Teknisk Selskabs Skole), he entered the school of architecture at the Royal Danish Academy where he studied under Martin Nyrop, graduating in 1893. He developed a simple style typified by compact structures of red brick with white cornices and trimmings.

== Career ==
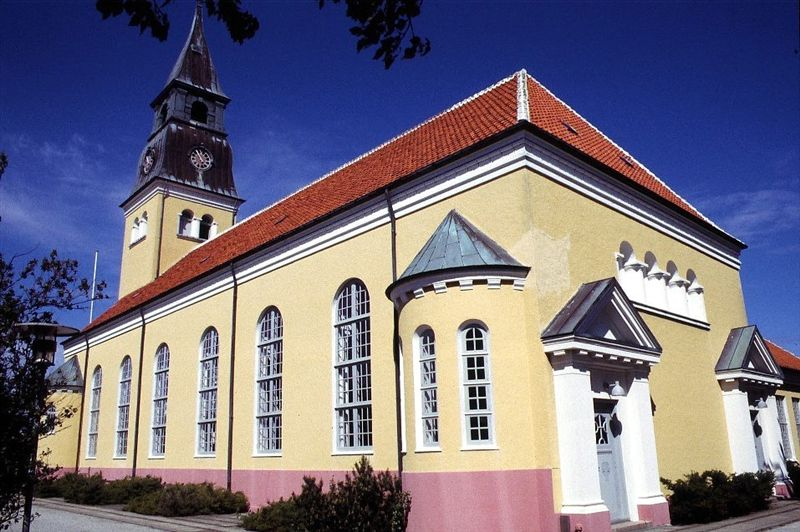
Skagen Church renovated by Ulrik Plesner in 1910

Plesner was first noted for an extension to Brøndums Hotel in Skagen which he completed in 1892. Much of his subsequent work was in Skagen where he lived for extended periods and became closely associated with the colony of artists known as the Skagen Painters. Highly respected by his colleagues, he contributed to the development of the main style of the period, Historicism. He also associated with Thorvald Bindesbøll who collaborated with him, often designing interiors in the Art Nouveau style.

== Contribution to Skagen architecture ==
Plesner first arrived in Skagen in 1891 in connection with the establishment of Højen Lighthouse. The same year he designed the first extension of Brøndums Hotel. The same year, he renovated the house belonging to P.S. Krøyer and in 1913 designed a house for Michael and Anna Ancher. In 1919, he drew up early designs for Skagens Museum and went on to design the town's railway station, hospital, bank, harbor-master's residence, post office and numerous private houses. Plesner died of a heart attack in 1933 while staying in Brøndums Hotel. The last building he designed before his death was Ålbæk railway station on the railway from Skagen to Frederikshavn.

== See also ==
- Ulrik Plesner (born 1930), architect and grandnephew of Ulrik Adolph Plesner
