= Frederikshavn railway station =

Railway station in Frederikshavn, Denmark

Frederikshavn
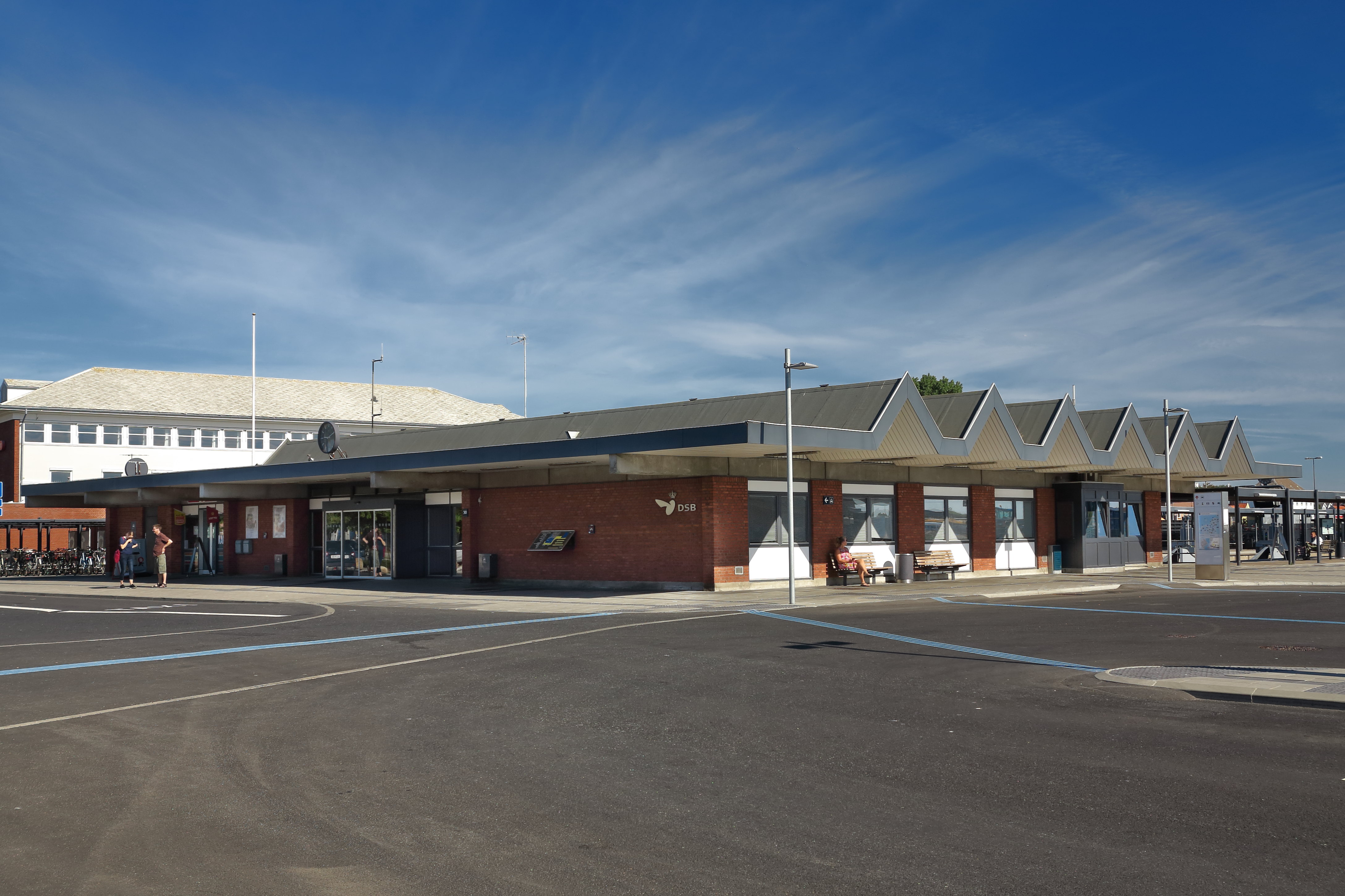
- Frederikshavn station in 2018

General information
- Location: Havnepladsen 30; 9990 Frederikshavn; Frederikshavn Municipality; Denmark
- Coordinates: 57°26′29.35″N 10°32′25.50″E
- Elevation: 3.8 metres (12 ft)
- Owner: DSB (station infrastructure); Banedanmark (rail infrastructure)
- Lines: Vendsyssel Line (since 1871); Skagen Line (since 1890); Sæby Line (1899–1962)
- Platforms: 3
- Tracks: 4
- Train operators: Nordjyske Jernbaner

History
- Opened: 15 August 1871
- Rebuilt: 1979

Services
Preceding station	Nordjyske Jernbaner	Following station
Kvissel towards Hobro	Hobro – Skagen Regional train	Strandby towards Skagen
Kvissel towards Hjørring	Hjørring – Skagen Local train Peak hours	Strandby towards Skagen
Location
- Location within Denmark

Frederikshavn railway station (Danish: Frederikshavn Station or Frederikshavn Banegård) is a railway station serving the town of Frederikshavn in Vendsyssel, Denmark. It is located in central Frederikshavn, situated between the town centre and the Port of Frederikshavn, and immediately adjacent to the Frederikshavn bus station.

The station is the terminus of the Vendsyssel railway line from Aalborg to Frederikshavn as well as the Skagen railway line from Frederikshavn to Skagen. The station opened in 1871 and was moved to its current location in 1979. It offers direct regional rail services to Aalborg as well as local train services to Skagen. The train services are currently operated by the local railway company Nordjyske Jernbaner.

== History ==
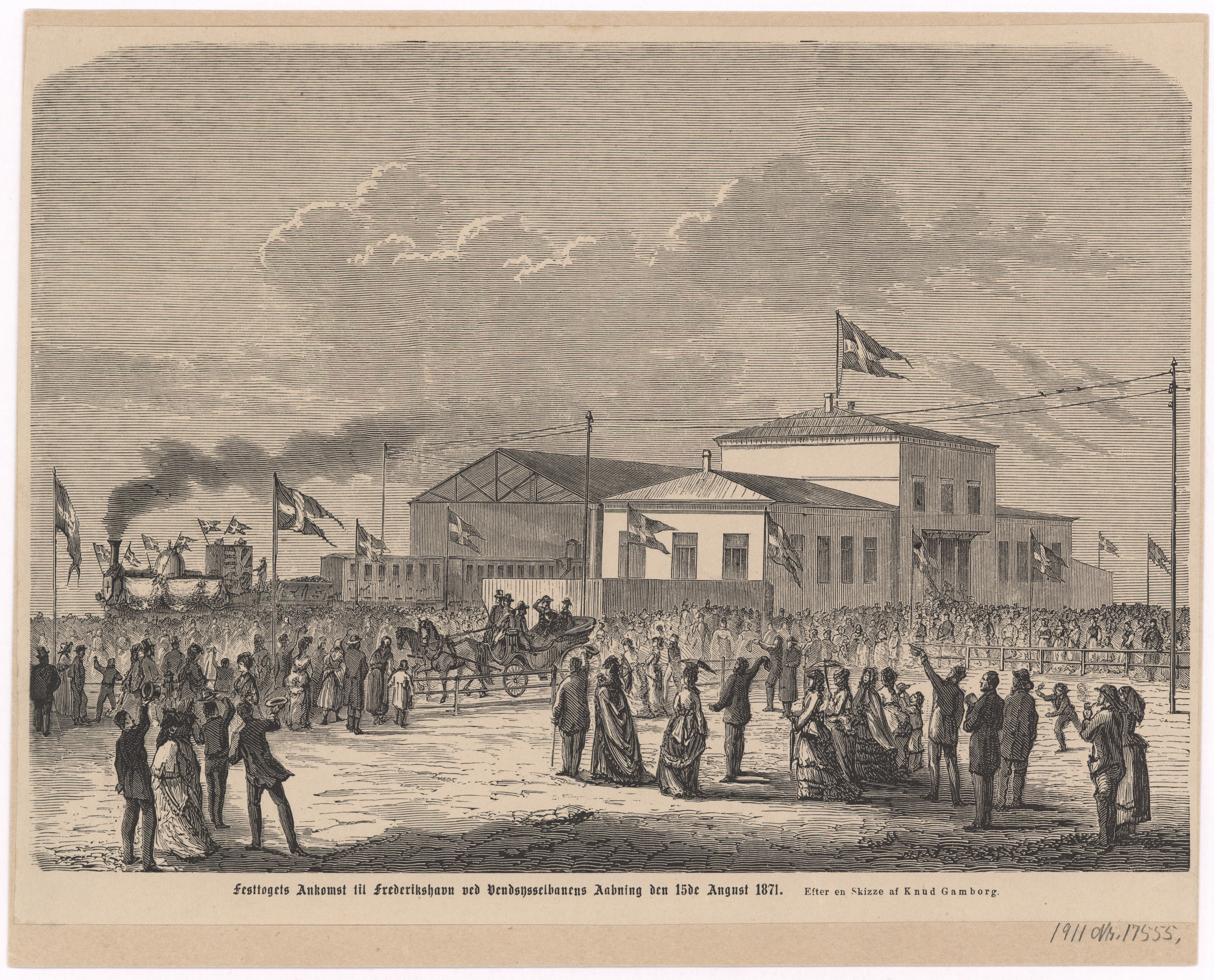
The opening train arrives to Frederikshavn Station at the opening of the Vendsyssel Line on 15 August 1871.

The current railway station in Frederikshavn is the town's second station. The first station opened in 1871 as the terminal station of the new Vendsyssel railway line from Nørresundby to Frederikshavn. The station was ceremonially opened by King Christian IX amid great festivities on 15 August 1871 along with the railway line. On 7 January 1879, at the opening of the Limfjord Railway Bridge which connected Nørresundby and Aalborg across the Limfjord, the line was connected with Aalborg station, the Randers–Aalborg railway line and the rest of Denmark's railway lines.

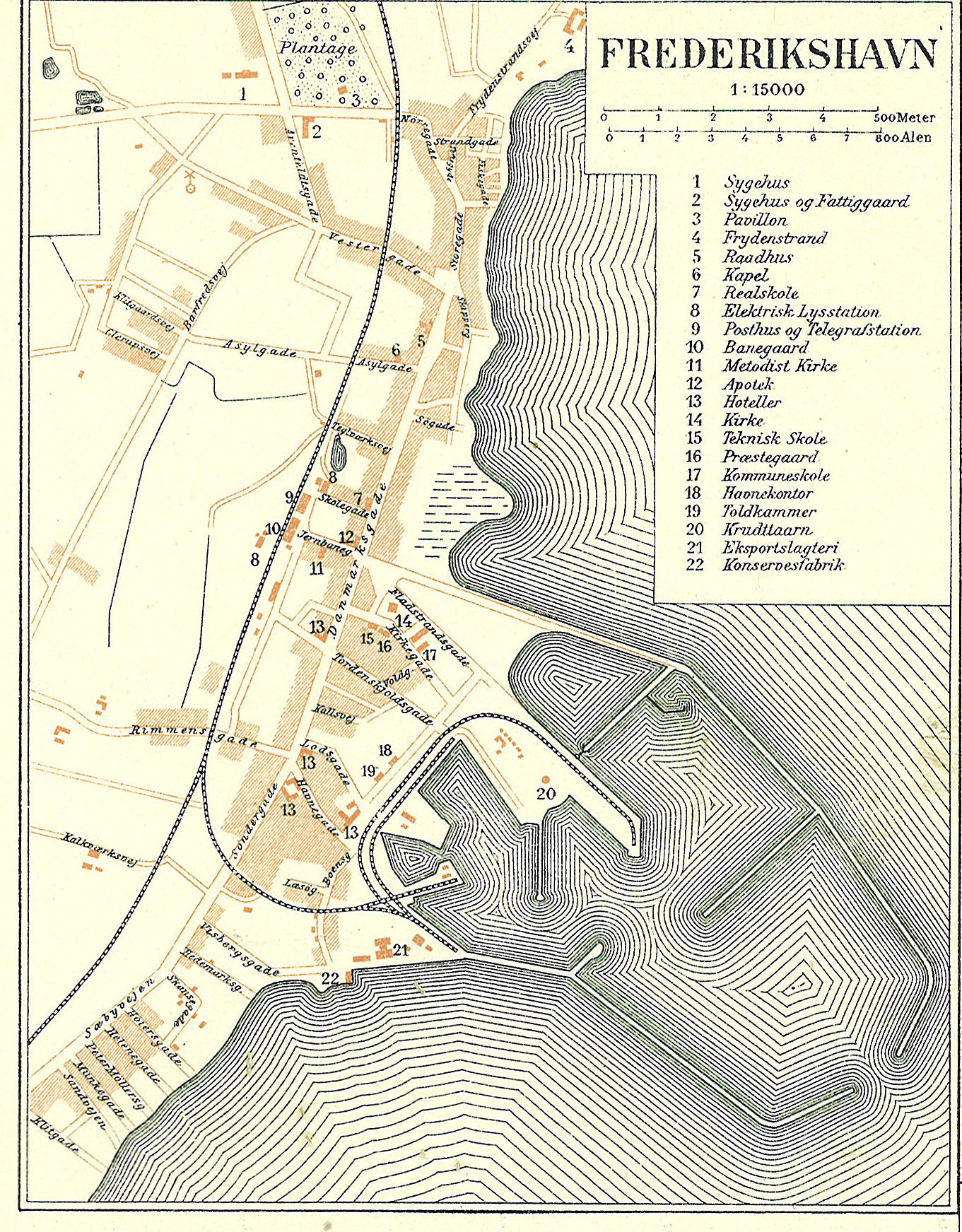
Map of Frederikshavn, c. 1900.

The original station was designed by the Danish architect Niels Peder Christian Holsøe (1826–1895), known for the numerous railway stations he designed across Denmark in his capacity of head architect of the Danish State Railways. It was located a short distance west of the current station, in the area where Frederikshavn Town Hall is now located.

The station became the southern terminus of the Skagen railway line between Frederikshavn og Skagen in 1890. In 1899 it also became the northern terminus of the Sæby railway line between Nørresundby and Frederikshavn, via Sæby, until the section between Sæby and Frederikshavn was closed in 1962.

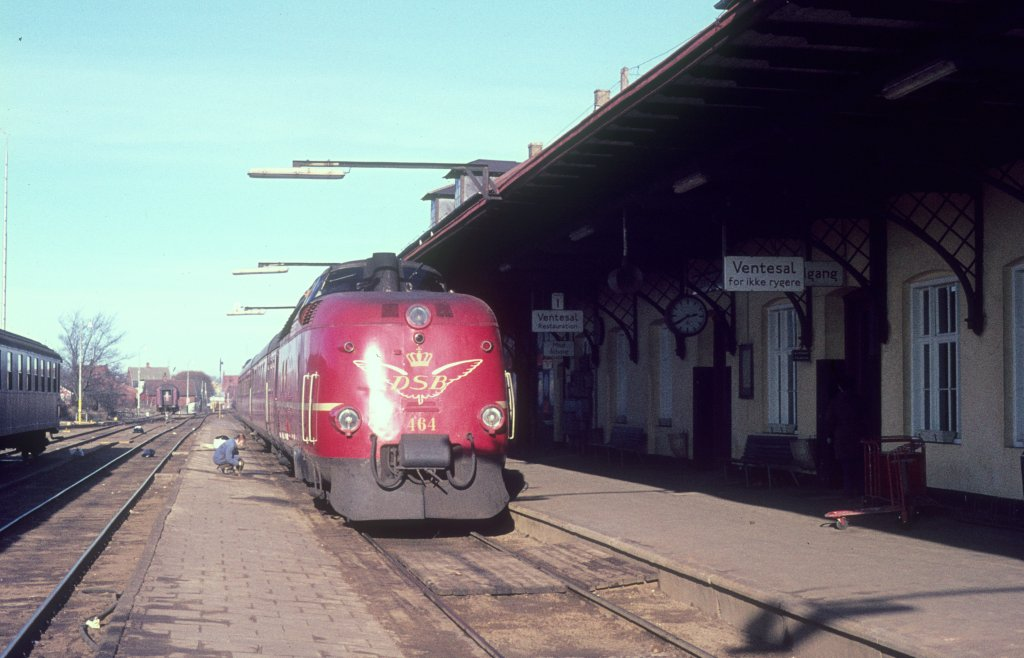
The express train Limfjorden arriving at the original Frederikshavn station in 1975.

The tracks to and from the station had several level crossings on their way through the town, which with the steadily increasing train traffic led to frequent blockages for the equally steadily increasing road traffic when the barriers were down. As a consequence, the station was moved to its current location in 1979, and the old station was closed and demolished.

In 2017, operation of the regional rail services on the Vendsyssel railway line between Aalborg and Frederikshavn were transferred from DSB to the local railway company Nordjyske Jernbaner.

== Facilities ==
Inside the station building there is a waiting room, automated ticket machines, toilets and lockers. The station forecourt has a taxi stand, and the station also has a bicycle parking station as well as a car park with approximately 176 parking spaces.

Adjacent to the railway station is the Frederikshavn bus station.

== Train services ==
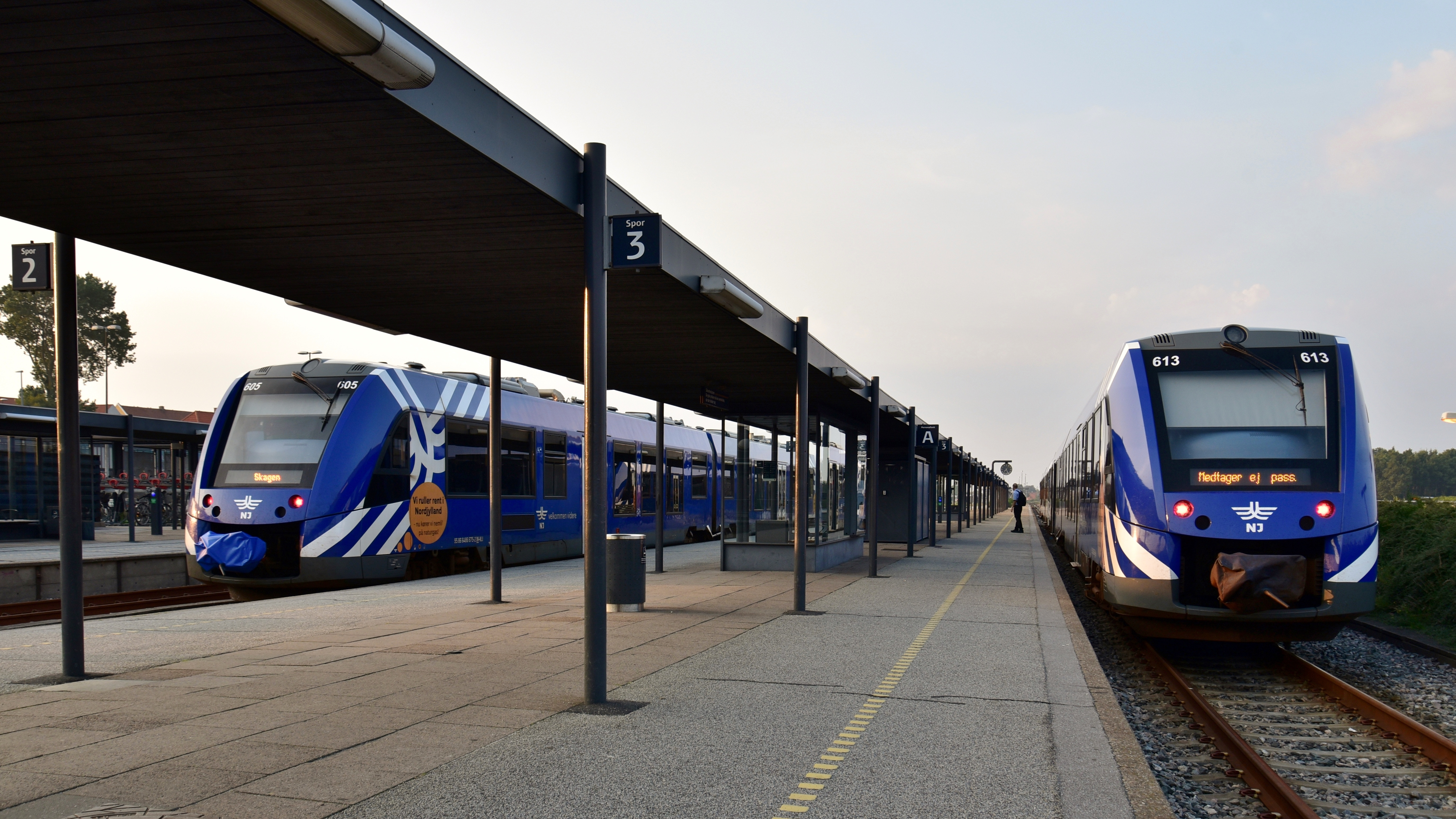
Trains at Frederikshavn station in 2019.

The station offers direct regional rail services to Aalborg, with onward connections from Aalborg to the rest of Denmark, as well as local train services to Skagen, both operated by the regional railway company Nordjyske Jernbaner which operates in the North Jutland Region.

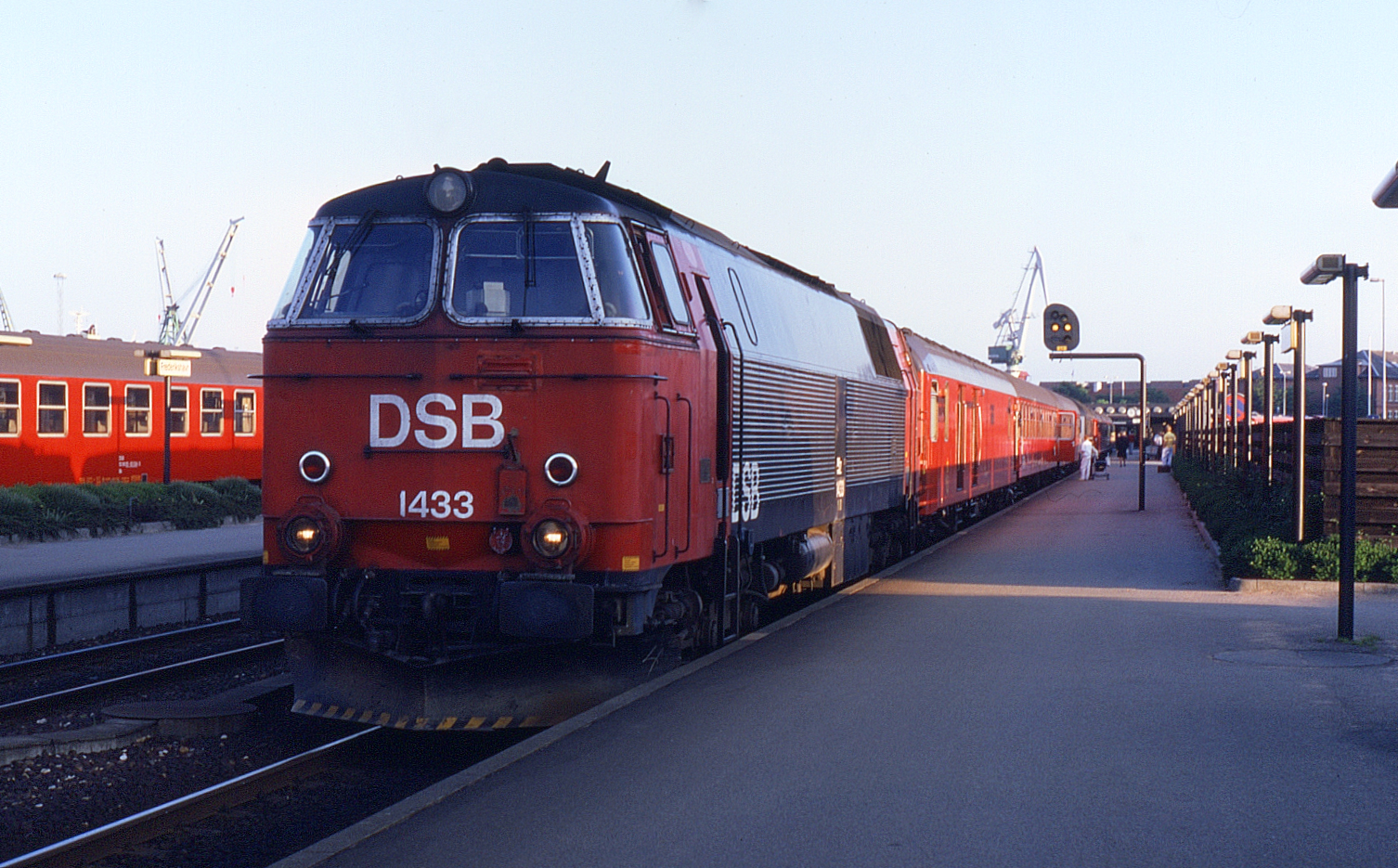
Overnight train to Copenhagen departing at 21:16 on 20 June 1986.

An international passenger service, Nordpilen, between Frederikshavn and Hamburg, connecting with the ferries to and from Sweden and Norway, ceased many years ago. Until the opening of the Great Belt Bridge in 1997, DSB also operated a night train service with sleeping cars from Frederikshavn to Copenhagen. The direct InterCity service from the station to Copenhagen operated by DSB ceased in 2019.

== See also ==
- List of railway stations in Denmark
- Rail transport in Denmark
- History of rail transport in Denmark
- Transport in Denmark

== See also ==
- Banedanmark
- Danish State Railways
- Nordjyske Jernbaner
- Transportation in Denmark
- Rail transport in Denmark
