= Skagen railway station =

Railway station in Skagen, Denmark

Skagen
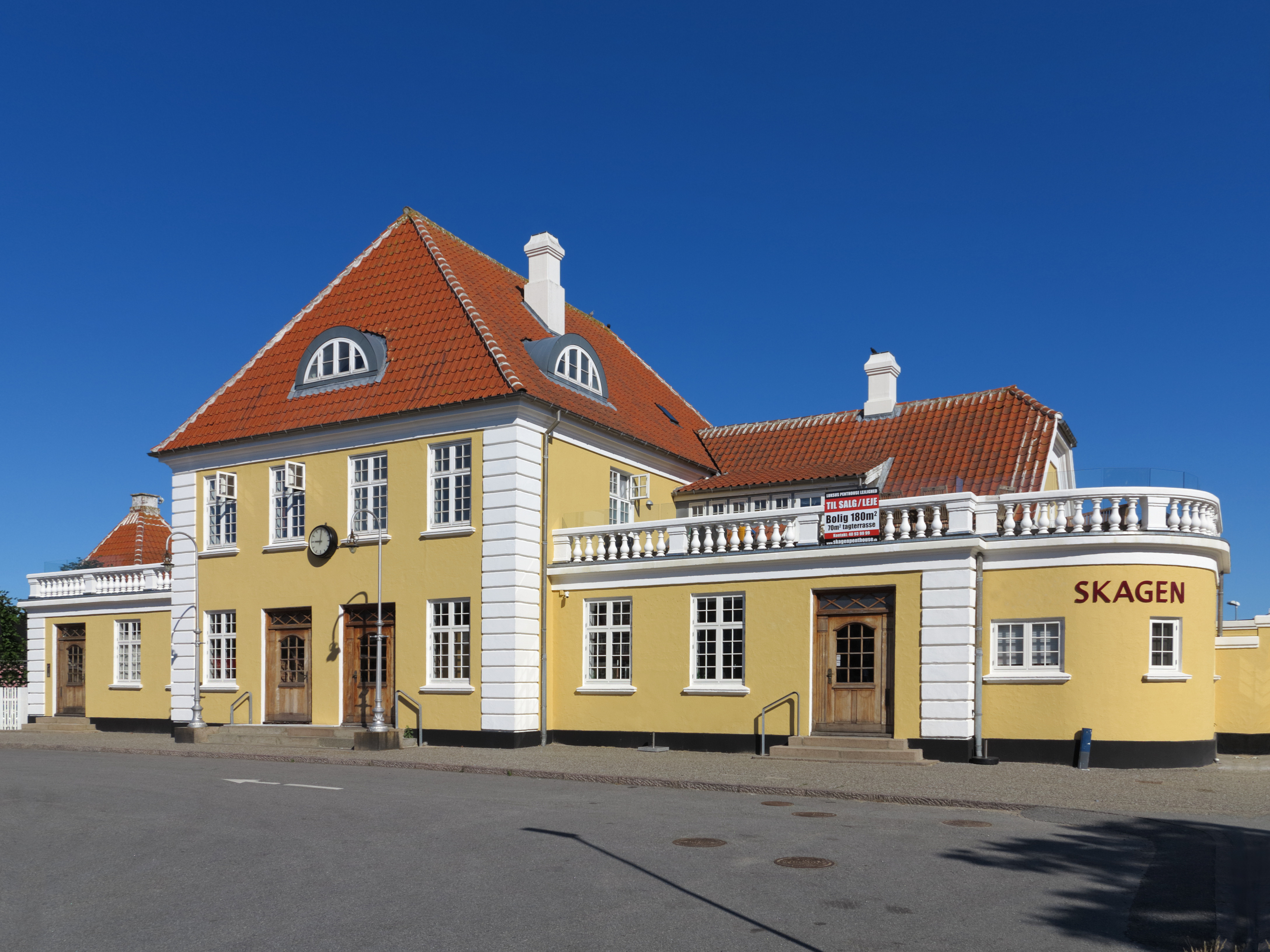
- Front facade of Skagen station

General information
- Location: Sankt Laurentii Vej 22; 9990 Skagen; Frederikshavn Municipality; Denmark
- Coordinates: 57°43′27″N 10°35′31″E
- Elevation: 2.4 metres (7 ft 10 in)
- Owner: Nordjyske Jernbaner
- Line: Skagen Line
- Platforms: 2
- Tracks: 3
- Train operators: Nordjyske Jernbaner

Construction
- Cycle facilities: 2 bicycle parking stations
- Accessible: Yes
- Architect: Thomas Arboe (1890); Ulrik Plesner (1919)
- Architectural style: Neoclassical

Other information
- Station code: Sgb
- Website: Official website

History
- Opened: 24 July 1890; 136 years ago
- Rebuilt: 1919
- Original company: Frederikshavn-Skagen Jernbane (FSJ)

Services
Preceding station	Nordjyske Jernbaner	Following station
Frederiks-havnsvej towards Hobro	Hobro – Skagen Local train	Terminus
Frederiks-havnsvej towards Hjørring	Hjørring – Skagen Local train Peak hours	Terminus
Location
- Location within Denmark

Skagen railway station (Danish: Skagen Station or Skagen Banegård) is the main railway station serving the town of Skagen in Vendsyssel, Denmark. The station is located in the central part of the town by its main artery Sankt Laurentii Vej.

The station is the northern terminus of the Skagensbanen railway line from Frederikshavn to Skagen and is the most northerly railway station in Denmark. The station opened in 1890 with the opening of the Skagensbanen railway line. The current station building was built in 1919. The train services are currently operated by the railway company Nordjyske Jernbaner (NJ) which run frequent local train services between Skagen and Frederikshavn with onward connections from Frederikshavn to the rest of Denmark.

== History ==
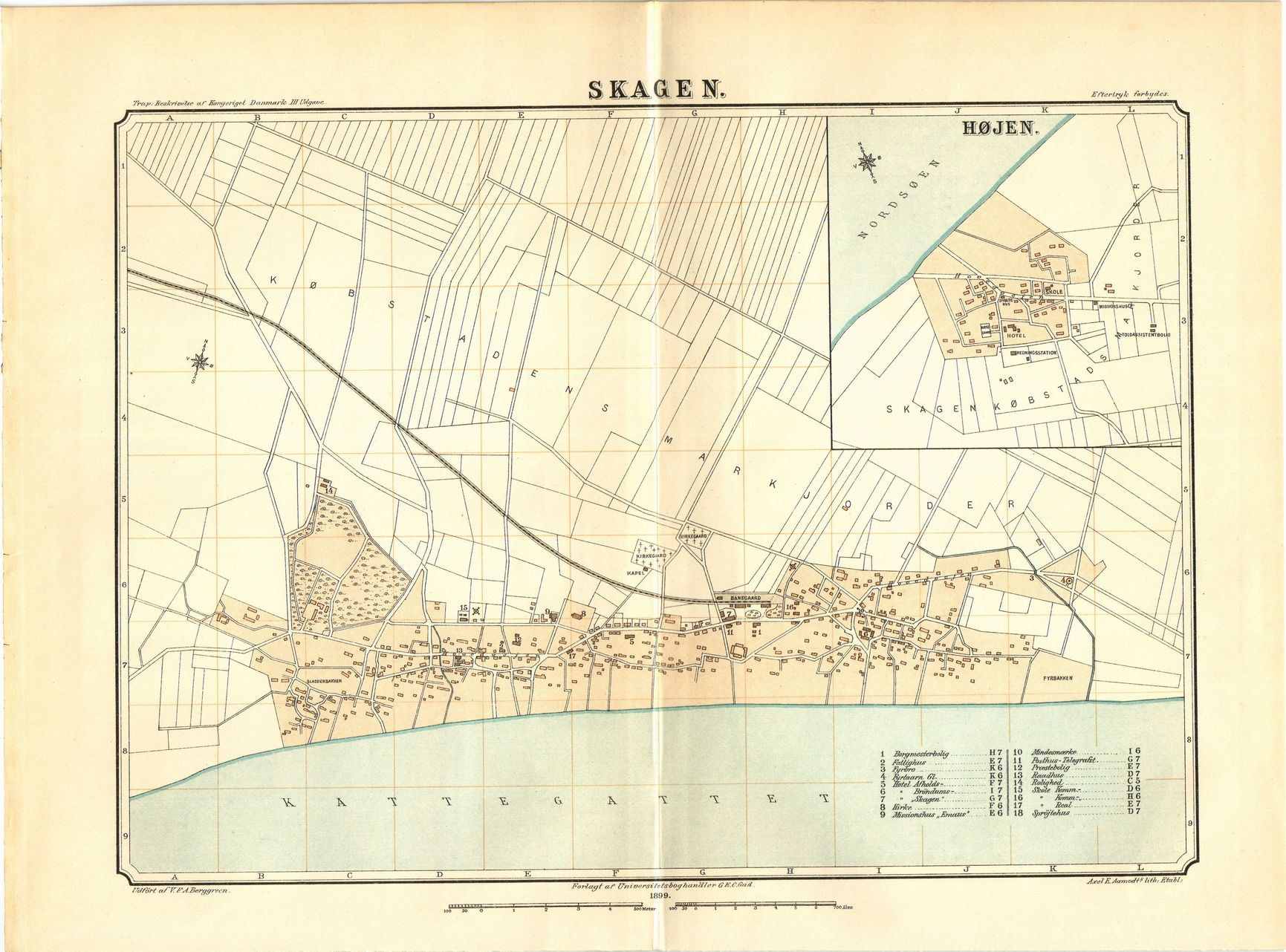
Map of Skagen in 1899 with the original right-of-way through Skagen.

The station opened in 1890 to serve as terminus of the new narrow gauge railway line from Frederikshavn to Skagen. In 1924, the railway line was converted to standard gauge to avoid the need to transfer cargoes of fish in Frederikshavn. As a consequence of the conversion, the right-of-way through Skagen town as well as the layout of Skagen station was extensively changed.

For a period, the Skagen tourist information centre was located in the station building, but in 2006 it moved to its current location by the Skagen Harbour.

== Architecture ==
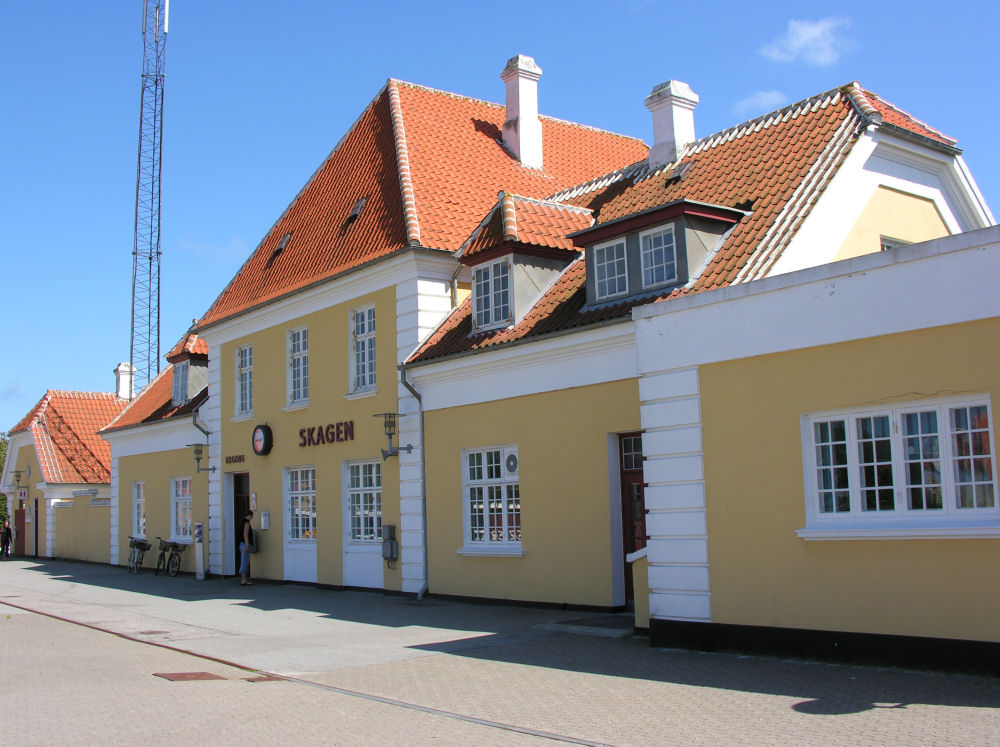
Platform facade of Skagen Station

The original station building from 1890 was designed by architect Thomas Arboe. The current station building was built in 1919 and is the work of architect Ulrik Plesner. It is in the style of the town's typical yellow-plastered houses with red tiled roofs with white trimmings which were built in Skagen from 1890 to 1930 and designed by Plesner. He was also the architect behind many other buildings in the town, including Brøndums Hotel and Skagen Museum.

In 1914, King Christian X of Denmark built the villa Klitgården by the Kattegat coast southwest of Skagen as a summer residence for the Danish royal family. Therefore, one of Skagen Station's two waiting rooms in the northern wing was furnished as a royal waiting room. Later, the Skagen Tourist Office has been housed in the royal waiting room, but in the autumn of 2006 the agency moved to the newly renovated harbor master's residence by the Skagen Harbor. In 2007, the former director's apartment on the station's 1st floor was converted into 3 apartments.

In 2017, the station building was thoroughly renovated, as it had fallen into disrepair. The renovation included new windows, the facade, the opening of a café in the former royal waiting room, and an extension.

== Operations ==
=== Train services ===
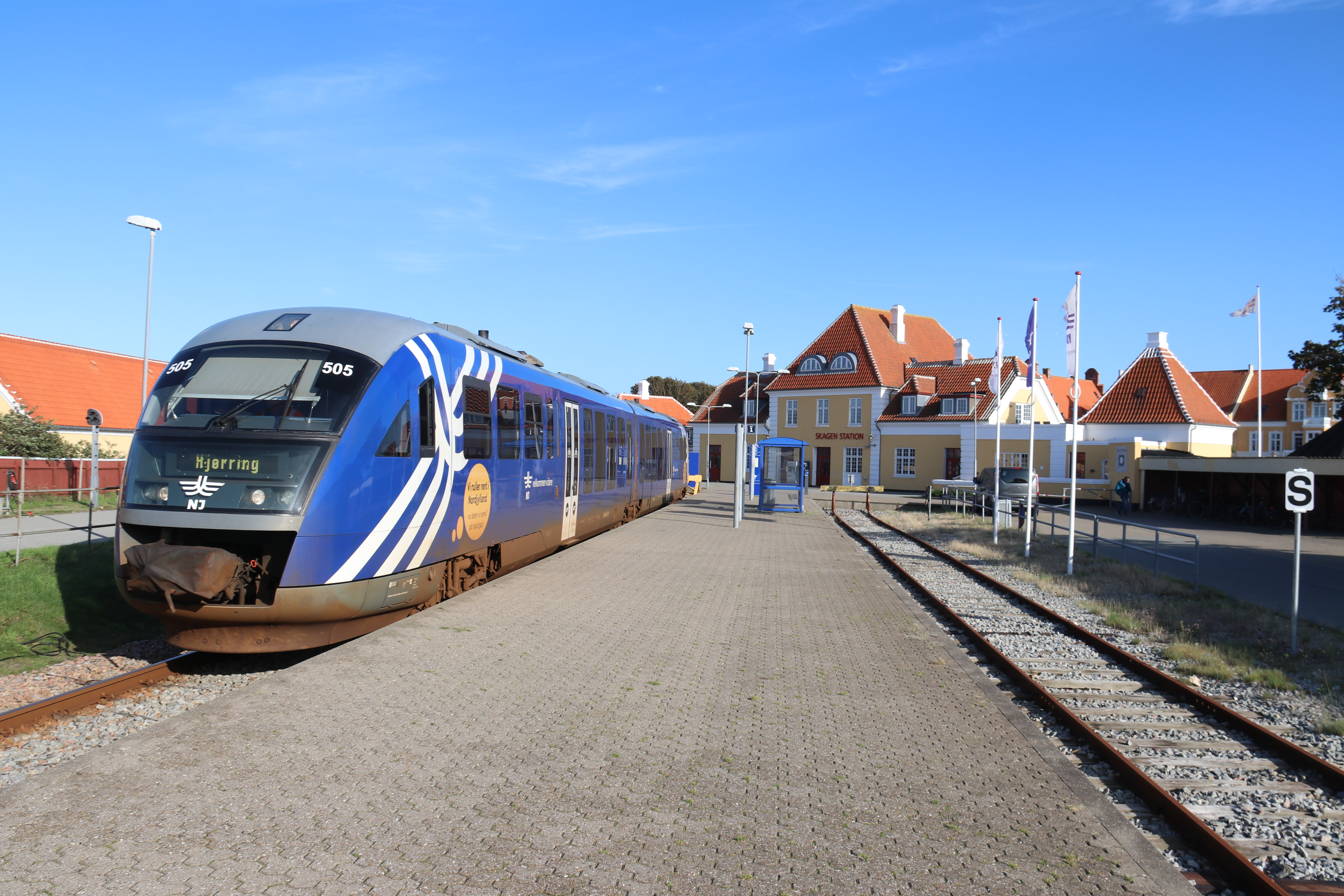
Train to Hjørring from Nordjyske Jernbaner at Skagen station in 2019.

The train services are currently operated by Nordjyske Jernbaner (NJ) which run frequent local train services from Skagen station to Frederikshavn station with onward connections to the rest of Denmark.

In a period during the 1990s there were direct InterCity connections between Copenhagen and Skagen, operated by DSB.

=== Bus services ===
In 2005, NJ replaced the bus connections between Skagen and Frederikshavn with more frequent train connections. Since then, there have only been bus connections from the station during the summer season, when Nordjyllands Trafikselskab's summer bus service connects Skagen with Blokhus.

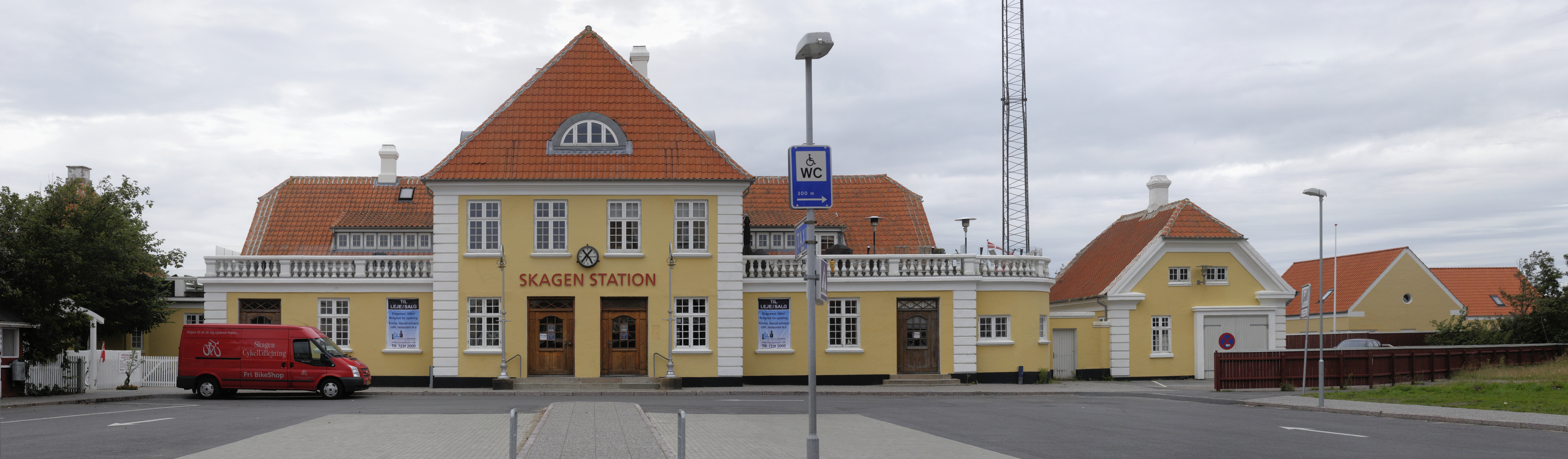
Skagen station

== See also ==
- List of railway stations in Denmark
- Rail transport in Denmark
- History of rail transport in Denmark
- Transport in Denmark
