= Tornby railway station =

Railway station in North Jutland, Denmark

Tornby
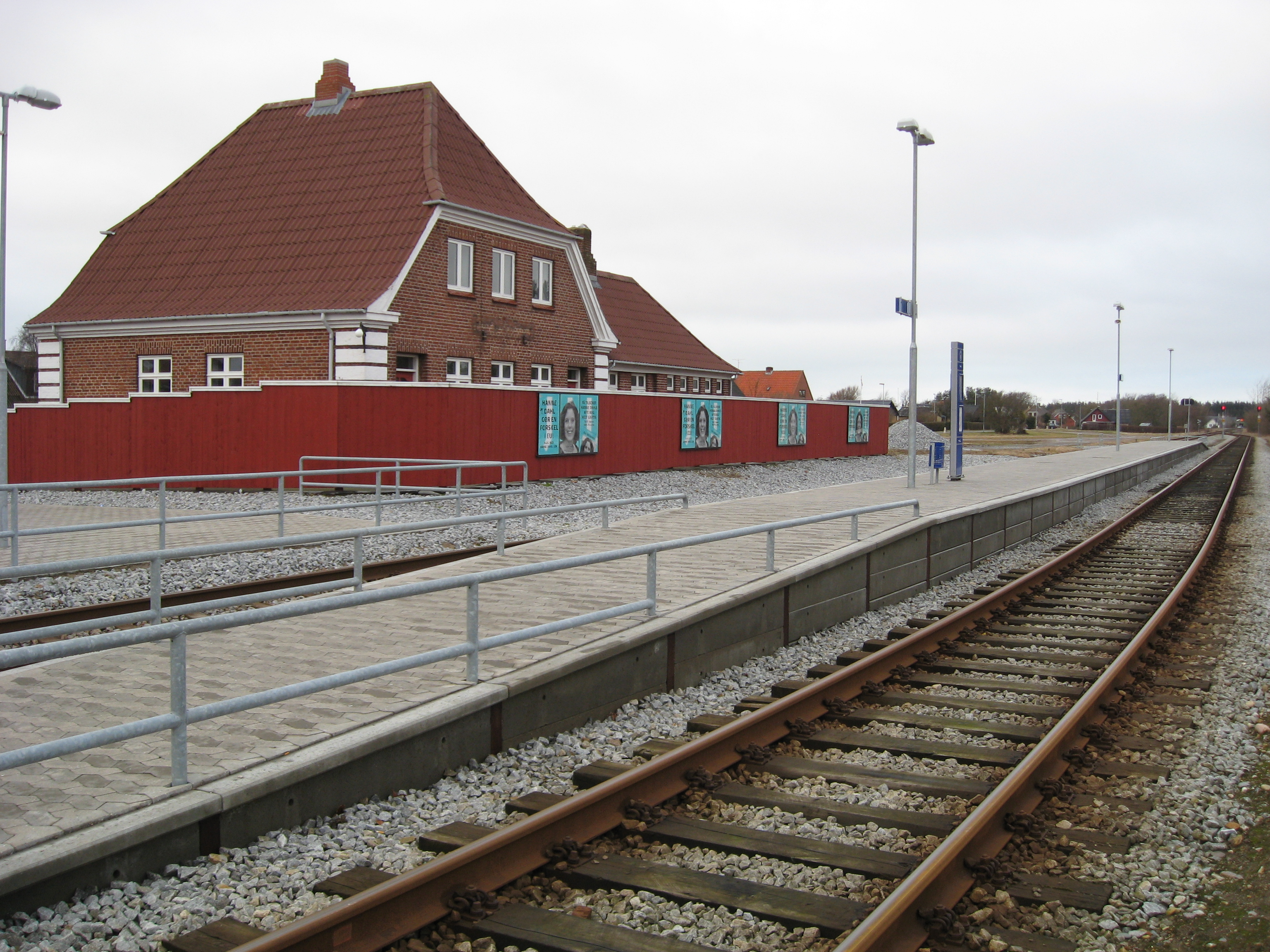
- Tornby station in 2009

General information
- Location: Stationsvej 2B; Tornby, 9850 Hirtshals; Hjørring Municipality; Denmark
- Coordinates: 57°31′58″N 9°56′58″E
- Elevation: 32.5 metres (107 ft)
- Owner: Nordjyske Jernbaner
- Line: Hirtshals Line
- Platforms: 2
- Tracks: 2
- Train operators: Nordjyske Jernbaner

History
- Opened: 1925

Services
Preceding station	Nordjyske Jernbaner	Following station
Vidstrup towards Hjørring	Hjørring – Hirtshals Local train	Horne towards Hirtshals
Vidstrup towards Skørping	Skørping – Hirtshals Regional train Peak hours	Horne towards Hirtshals
Location
- Location within Denmark Location within North Jutland Region

Tornby railway station is a railway station serving the village of Tornby in Vendsyssel, Denmark.

Tornby station is located on the Hirtshals Line between Hirtshals and Hjørring. The station opened in 1925. The train services are currently operated by Nordjyske Jernbaner which run frequent local train services between Hirtshals and Hjørring with onward connections from Hjørring to the rest of Denmark.

== History ==
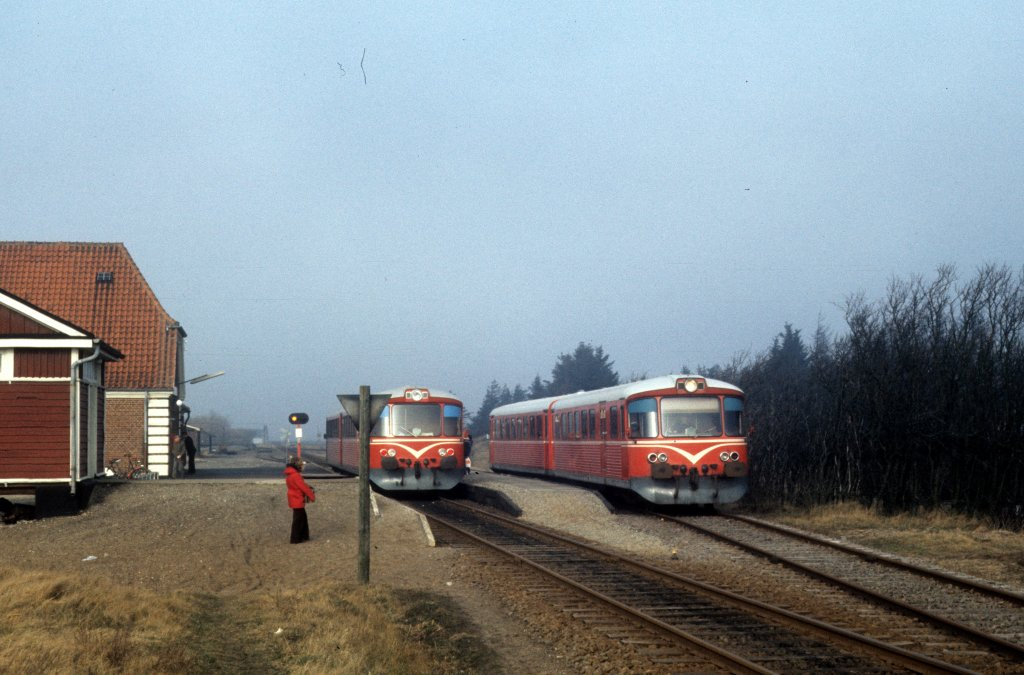
Tornby station in 1975

The station opened in 1925 when the railway started. The station is now closed but continues as a halt.

== Operations ==
The train services are currently operated by Nordjyske Jernbaner which run frequent local train services between Hirtshals and Hjørring with onward connections from Hjørring to the rest of Denmark.

== See also ==
- List of railway stations in Denmark
- Rail transport in Denmark
