= Teglgårdsvej railway halt =

Railway halt in Hjørring, Denmark

Teglgårdsvej
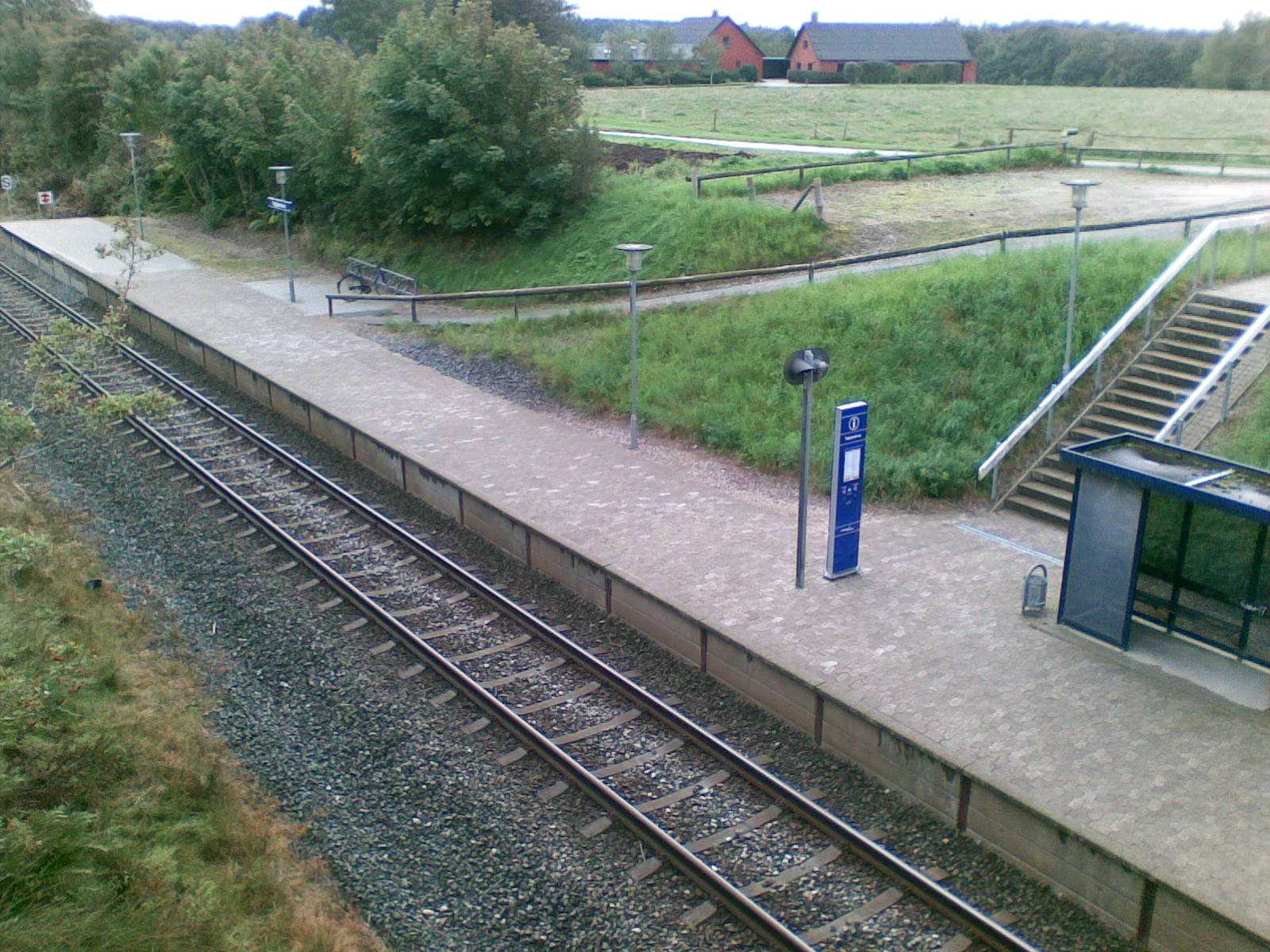
- Teglgårdsvej railway halt in 2008

General information
- Location: Teglgårdsvej 1; 9800 Hjørring; Hjørring Municipality; Denmark
- Coordinates: 57°27′37″N 9°57′47″E
- Elevation: 29.9 metres (98 ft)
- Owner: Nordjyske Jernbaner
- Line: Hirtshals Line
- Platforms: 1 side platform
- Tracks: 1
- Train operators: Nordjyske Jernbaner

History
- Opened: 2004

Services
Preceding station	Nordjyske Jernbaner	Following station
Kvægtorvet towards Hjørring	Hjørring – Hirtshals Local train	Herregårdsparken towards Hirtshals
Kvægtorvet towards Skørping	Skørping – Hirtshals Regional train Peak hours	Herregårdsparken towards Hirtshals
Location

Teglgårdsvej railway halt is a railway halt serving the western part of the town of Hjørring in Vendsyssel, Denmark.

The halt is located on the Hirtshals Line between Hirtshals and Hjørring. It was opened in 2004. The train services are currently operated by Nordjyske Jernbaner which run frequent local train services between Hirtshals and Hjørring with onward connections from Hjørring to the rest of Denmark.

== Operations ==
The train services are currently operated by Nordjyske Jernbaner which run frequent local train services between Hirtshals and Hjørring with onward connections from Hjørring to the rest of Denmark.

== See also ==
- List of railway stations in Denmark
- Rail transport in Denmark
