= Herregårdsparken railway halt =

Railway halt in Hjørring, Denmark

Herregårdsparken
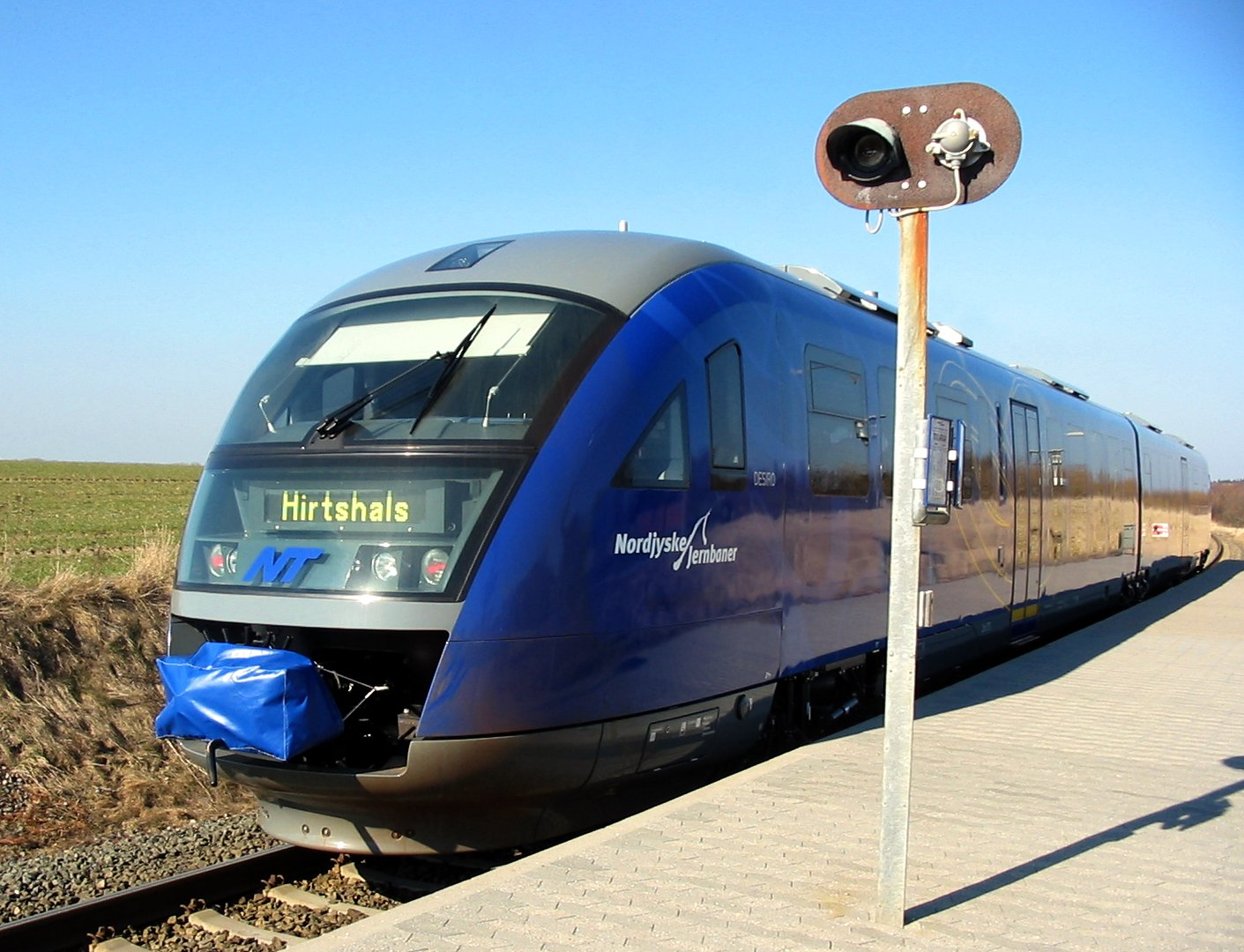

General information
- Location: Børglumklostervej 31; 9800 Hjørring; Hjørring Municipality; Denmark
- Coordinates: 57°28′24″N 9°57′57″E
- Elevation: 27.2 metres (89 ft)
- Owner: Nordjyske Jernbaner
- Line: Hirtshals Line
- Platforms: 1 side platform
- Tracks: 1
- Train operators: Nordjyske Jernbaner

History
- Opened: 2004

Services
Preceding station	Nordjyske Jernbaner	Following station
Teglgårdsvej towards Hjørring	Hjørring – Hirtshals Local train	Vellingshøj towards Hirtshals
Teglgårdsvej towards Skørping	Skørping – Hirtshals Regional train Peak hours	Vellingshøj towards Hirtshals
Location

Herregårdsparken railway halt (Danish: Herregårdsparken Trinbræt) is a railway halt serving the northwestern part of the town of Hjørring in Vendsyssel, Denmark.

The halt is located on the Hirtshals Line between Hirtshals and Hjørring. It opened in 2004. The train services are currently operated by the railway company Nordjyske Jernbaner which run frequent local train services between Hirtshals and Hjørring.

== Operations ==
The train services are currently operated by Nordjyske Jernbaner which run frequent local train services between Hirtshals and Hjørring with onward connections from Hjørring to the rest of Denmark.

== See also ==
- List of railway stations in Denmark
