= Vidstrup railway station =

Railway station in North Jutland, Denmark

Vidstrup
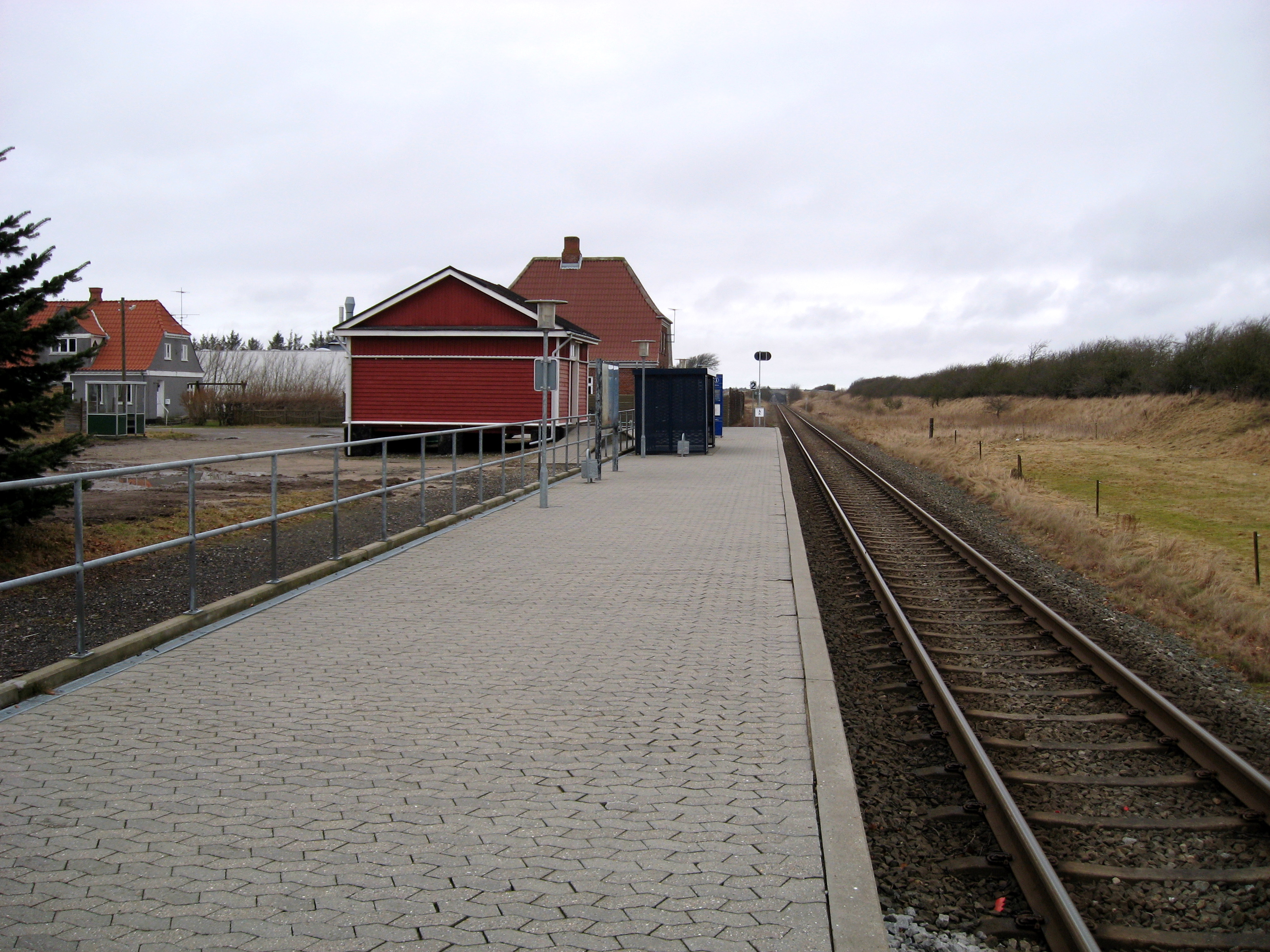
- Vidstrup station in 2009

General information
- Location: Højenevej 1a Vidstrup, 9800 Hjørring; Hjørring Municipality; Denmark
- Coordinates: 57°30′07″N 9°56′51″E
- Elevation: 27.0 metres (88.6 ft)
- Owner: Nordjyske Jernbaner
- Line: Hirtshals Line
- Platforms: 1 side platform
- Tracks: 1
- Train operators: Nordjyske Jernbaner

History
- Opened: 1925

Services
Preceding station	Nordjyske Jernbaner	Following station
Vellingshøj towards Hjørring	Hjørring – Hirtshals Local train	Tornby towards Hirtshals
Vellingshøj towards Skørping	Skørping – Hirtshals Regional train Peak hours	Tornby towards Hirtshals
Location
- Location within Denmark Location within North Jutland Region

Vidstrup railway station is a railway station serving the village of Vidstrup in Vendsyssel, Denmark.

Vidstrup station is located on the Hirtshals railway line between Hirtshals and Hjørring. The station opened in 1925. The train services are currently operated by Nordjyske Jernbaner which run frequent local train services between Hirtshals and Hjørring with onward connections from Hjørring to the rest of Denmark.

== History ==
The station opened in 1925 when the railway started. The station was closed in 1969 but continues as a halt.

== Operations ==
The train services are currently operated by Nordjyske Jernbaner which run frequent local train services between Hirtshals and Hjørring with onward connections from Hjørring to the rest of Denmark.

== See also ==
- List of railway stations in Denmark
- Rail transport in Denmark
