= Vellingshøj railway station =

Railway station in Hjørring, Denmark

Vellingshøj
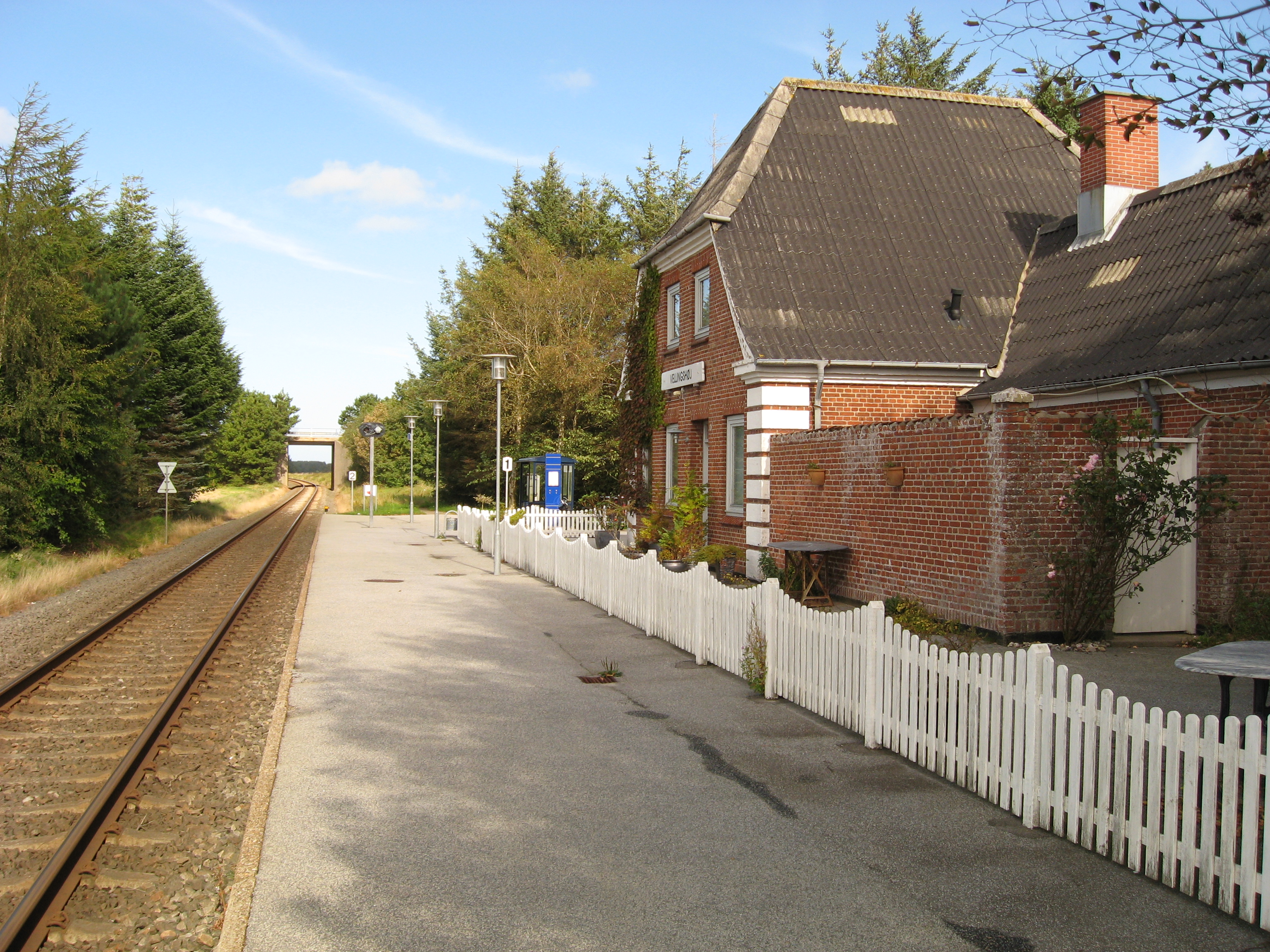
- Vellingshøj station in 2008

General information
- Location: Engtoften 21; Vellingshøj, 9800 Hjørring; Hjørring Municipality; Denmark
- Coordinates: 57°28′50″N 9°58′07″E
- Elevation: 29.7 metres (97 ft)
- Owner: Nordjyske Jernbaner
- Line: Hirtshals Line
- Platforms: 1
- Tracks: 1
- Train operators: Nordjyske Jernbaner

History
- Opened: 1925

Services
Preceding station	Nordjyske Jernbaner	Following station
Herregårdsparken towards Hjørring	Hjørring – Hirtshals Local train	Vidstrup towards Hirtshals
Herregårdsparken towards Skørping	Skørping – Hirtshals Regional train Peak hours	Vidstrup towards Hirtshals
Location
- Location within Denmark Location within North Jutland Region

Vellingshøj railway station is a railway station serving the district of Højene in the northern part of the town of Hjørring in Vendsyssel, Denmark.

Vellingshøj station is located on the Hirtshals railway line between Hirtshals and Hjørring. The station opened in 1925. The train services are currently operated by Nordjyske Jernbaner which run frequent local train services between Hirtshals and Hjørring with onward connections from Hjørring to the rest of Denmark.

== History ==
The station opened in 1925 when the railway started. The station was closed in 1931 but continues as a halt.

== Operations ==
The train services are currently operated by Nordjyske Jernbaner which run frequent local train services between Hirtshals and Hjørring with onward connections from Hjørring to the rest of Denmark.

== See also ==
- List of railway stations in Denmark
