= Emmersbæk railway halt =

Railway halt in Hirtshals, Denmark

Emmersbæk
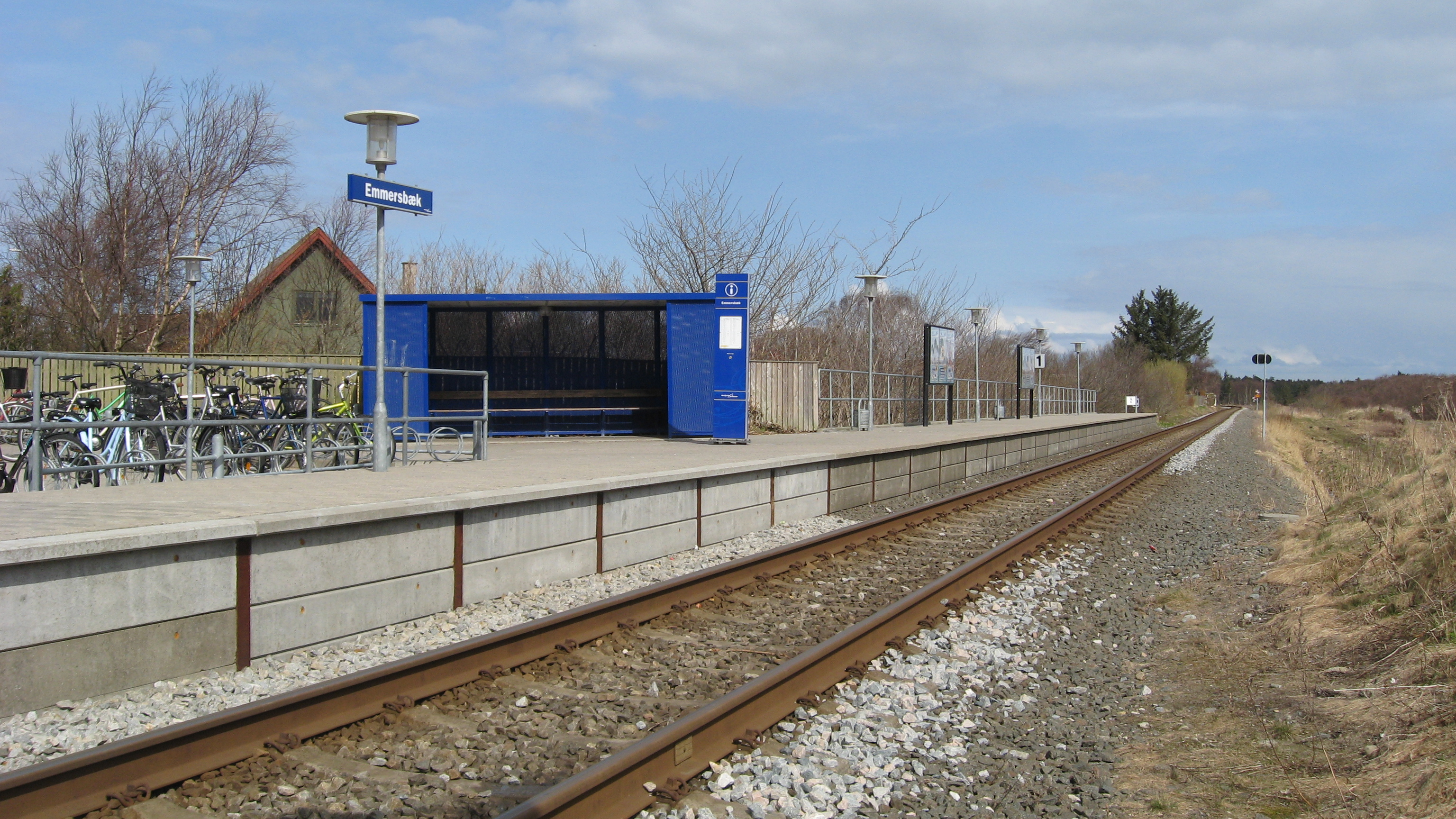
- Emmersbæk halt in 2010

General information
- Location: Emmersbækvej 75; Emmersbæk, 9850 Hirtshals; Hjørring Municipality; Denmark
- Coordinates: 57°34′20″N 9°58′39″E
- Elevation: 28.1 metres (92 ft)
- System: railway halt
- Owner: Nordjyske Jernbaner
- Line: Hirtshals Line
- Platforms: 1 side platform
- Tracks: 1
- Train operators: Nordjyske Jernbaner

History
- Opened: 1925
- Former names: Terpet

Services
Preceding station	Nordjyske Jernbaner	Following station
Horne towards Hjørring	Hjørring – Hirtshals Local train	Lilleheden towards Hirtshals
Horne towards Skørping	Skørping – Hirtshals Regional train Peak hours	Lilleheden towards Hirtshals
Location
- Location within Denmark Location within North Jutland Region

Emmersbæk railway halt (Danish: Emmersbæk Trinbræt; previously Terpet railway halt) is a railway halt serving the southern part of the town of Hirtshals in Vendsyssel, Denmark.

The halt is located on the Hirtshals Line between Hirtshals and Hjørring. It opened in 1925. The train services are currently operated by Nordjyske Jernbaner which run frequent local train services between Hirtshals and Hjørring with onward connections from Hjørring to the rest of Denmark.

== History ==
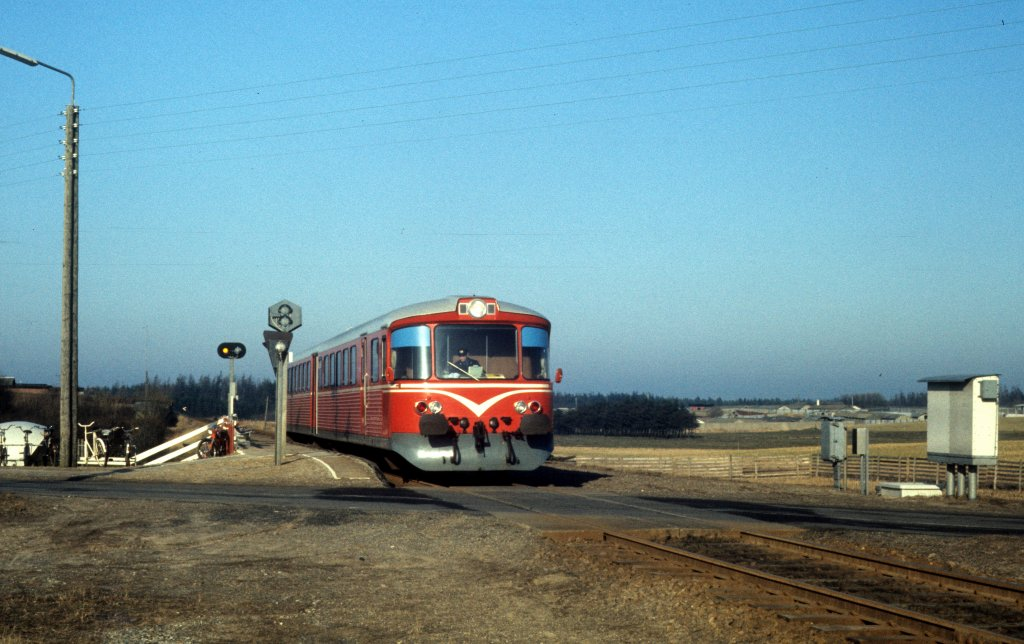
Train calling at Terpet halt in 1975

The halt opened as Terpet railway halt in 1925 when the railway line opened.

== Operations ==
The train services are currently operated by Nordjyske Jernbaner which run frequent local train services between Hirtshals and Hjørring with onward connections from Hjørring to the rest of Denmark.

== See also ==
- List of railway stations in Denmark
