= Kvægtorvet railway halt =

Railway station in Hjørring, Denmark

Kvægtorvet
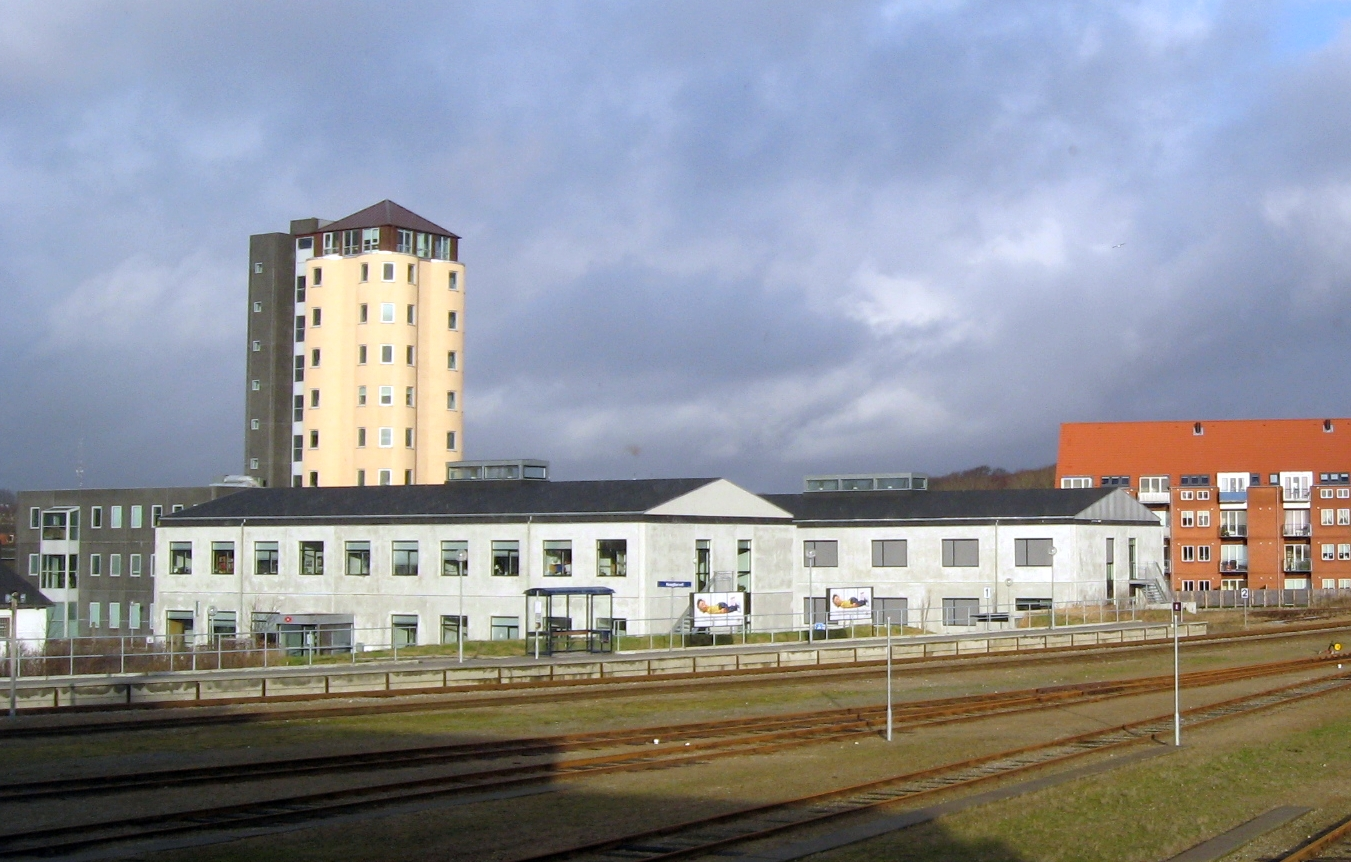
- Kvægtorvet railway halt in 2008

General information
- Location: Åstrupvej 13; 9800 Hjørring; Hjørring Municipality; Denmark
- Coordinates: 57°27′16″N 9°58′34″E
- Elevation: 34.5 metres (113 ft)
- Owner: Nordjyske Jernbaner
- Line: Hirtshals Line
- Platforms: 1 side platform
- Tracks: 1
- Train operators: Nordjyske Jernbaner

History
- Opened: January 2005

Services
Preceding station	Nordjyske Jernbaner	Following station
Hjørring Terminus	Hjørring – Hirtshals Local train	Teglgårdsvej towards Hirtshals
Hjørring towards Skørping	Skørping – Hirtshals Regional train Peak hours	Teglgårdsvej towards Hirtshals
Location

Kvægtorvet railway halt is a railway halt serving the western part of the town of Hjørring in Vendsyssel, Denmark.

The halt is located on the Hirtshals Line between Hirtshals and Hjørring. It was opened in 2005. The train services are currently operated by Nordjyske Jernbaner which run frequent local train services between Hirtshals and Hjørring with onward connections from Hjørring to the rest of Denmark.

== Operations ==
The train services are currently operated by Nordjyske Jernbaner which run frequent local train services between Hirtshals and Hjørring with onward connections from Hjørring to the rest of Denmark.

== See also ==
- List of railway stations in Denmark
