= Lilleheden railway halt =

Railway halt in Hirtshals, Denmark

Lilleheden
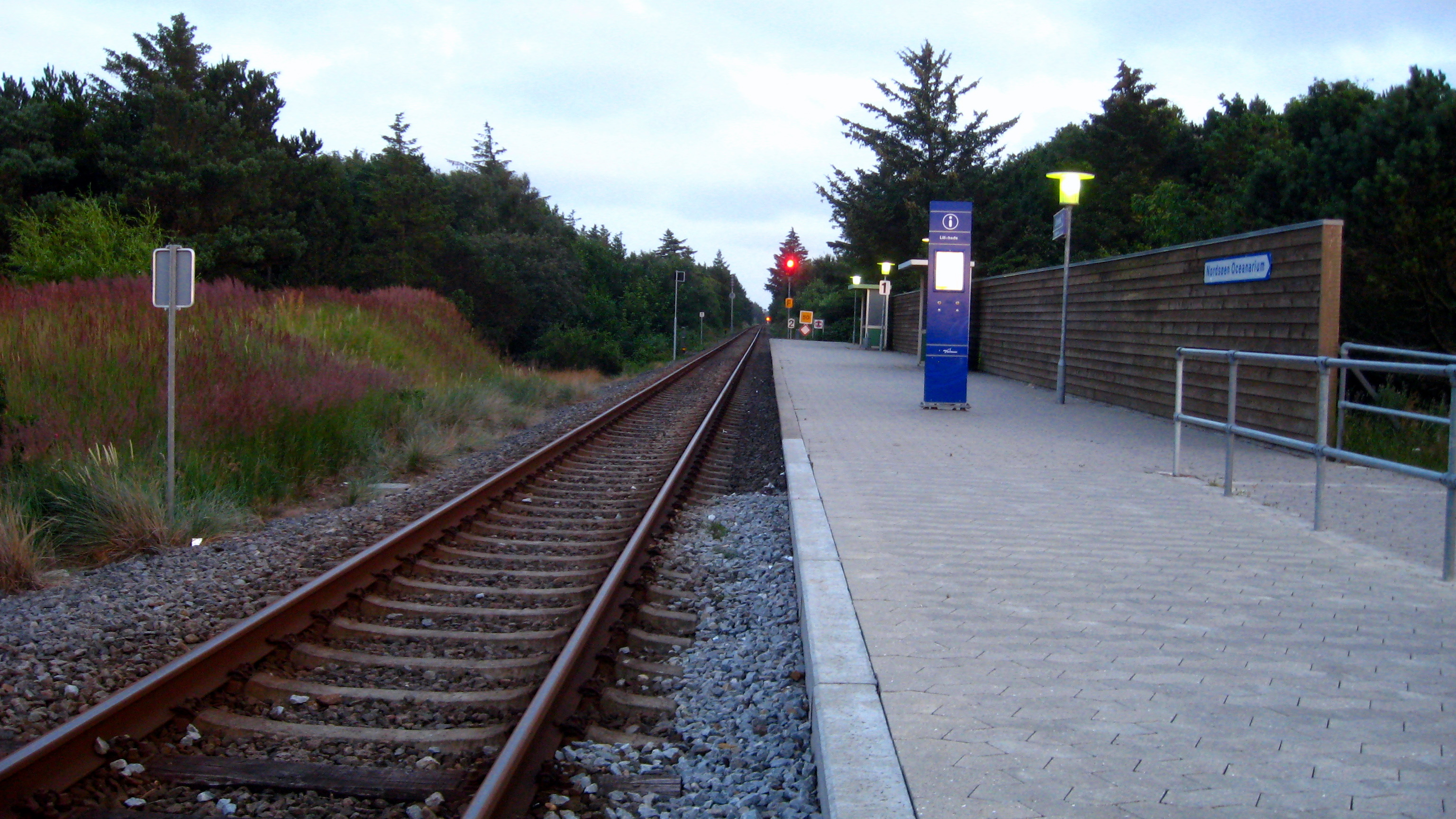
- Lilleheden halt in 2009

General information
- Location: Skovvejen 28, 9850 Hirtshals; Hjørring Municipality; Denmark
- Coordinates: 57°35′06.80″N 9°58′34.79″E
- Elevation: 13.1 metres (43 ft)
- Owner: Nordjyske Jernbaner
- Line: Hirtshals Line
- Platforms: 1
- Train operators: Nordjyske Jernbaner

History
- Opened: 1 May 1940, 1990s
- Closed: 1956

Services
Preceding station	Nordjyske Jernbaner	Following station
Emmersbæk towards Hjørring	Hjørring – Hirtshals Local train	Hirtshals Terminus
Emmersbæk towards Skørping	Skørping – Hirtshals Regional train Peak hours	Hirtshals Terminus
Location
- Location within Denmark Location within North Jutland Region

Lilleheden railway halt (Danish: Lilleheden Trinbræt) is a railway halt serving the eastern part of the town of Hirtshals in Vendsyssel, Denmark, as well as the nearby public aquarium Nordsøen Oceanarium.

The halt is located on the Hirtshals Line between Hirtshals and Hjørring. It opened in 1940, was closed again in 1956, but reopened in the 1990s. The train services are currently operated by the railway company Nordjyske Jernbaner which run frequent local train services between Hirtshals and Hjørring with onward connections from Hjørring to the rest of Denmark.

== History ==
The halt was opened on 1 May 1940. It was closed from 1943 to 1946 as it was located in an area used by the Wehrmacht during Nazi Germany's Occupation of Denmark.

The halt was closed again in 1956, but reopened in the 1990s.

== Operations ==
The train services are currently operated by Nordjyske Jernbaner which run frequent local train services between Hirtshals and Hjørring with onward connections from Hjørring to the rest of Denmark.

== See also ==
- List of railway stations in Denmark
