= Hirtshals Line =

Railway line in North Jutland, Denmark

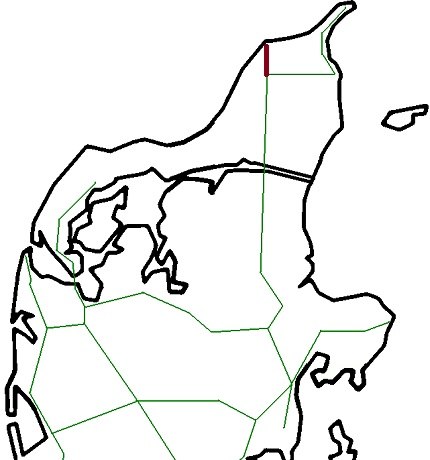

Overview
- Native name: Hirtshalsbanen
- Owner: Nordjyske Jernbaner
- Termini: Hjørring; Hirtshals
- Stations: 13
- Website: https://nj.dk

Service
- Type: Railway
- System: Danish railways
- Operator(s): Nordjyske Jernbaner
- Rolling stock: Siemens Desiro

History
- Opened: 18 December 1925

Technical
- Line length: 17.7 km (11.0 mi)
- Number of tracks: 1
- Character: Local railway
- Track gauge: 1,435 mm (4 ft 8 1/2 in)
- Electrification: No
- Operating speed: 100 km/h (62 mph) (Hjørring–Tornby); 75 km/h (47 mph) (Tornby–Hirtshals)
Map of the Hirtshals Line
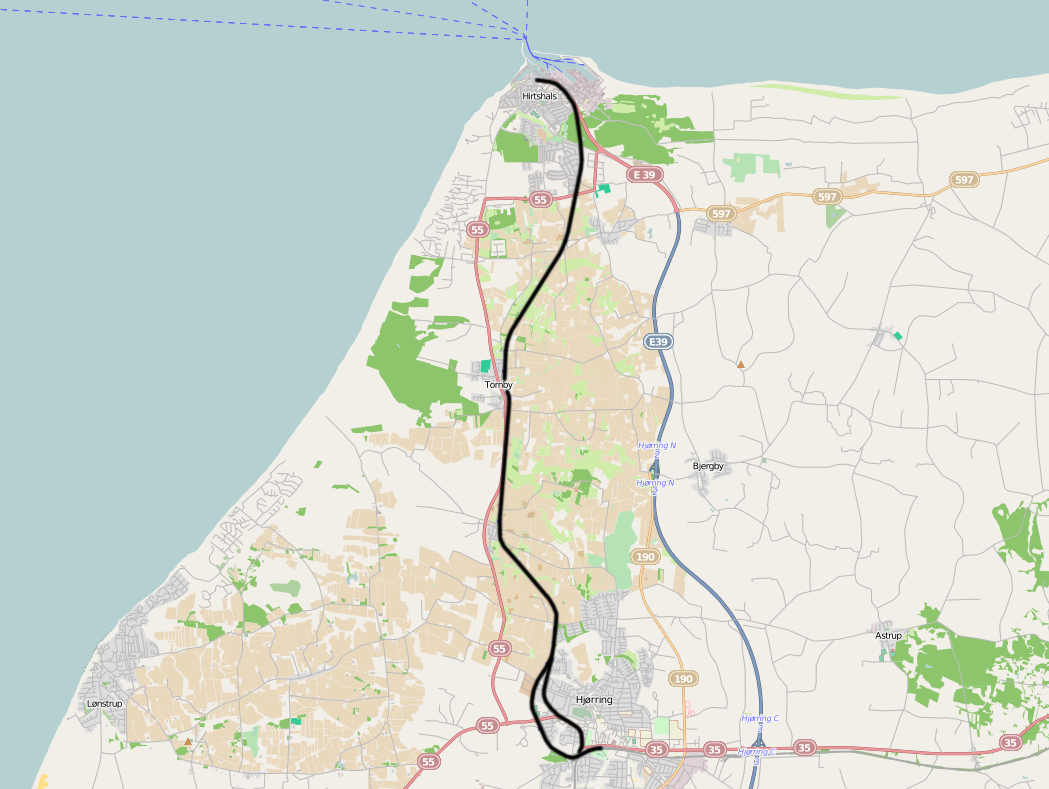
Map of the Hirtshals Line between Hjørring and Hirtshals

The Hirtshals railway line (Danish: Hirtshalsbanen) is a 17.7 km (11.0 mi) long standard gauge single track railway line between Hjørring and Hirtshals, Denmark. The railway links the fishing and ferry port of Hirtshals with the Danish rail network.

The railway line opened in 1925. It is currently owned and operated by the railway company Nordjyske Jernbaner (NJ) which runs frequent local train services from Hirtshals to Hjørring with onward connections from Hjørring to the rest of Denmark.

== History ==
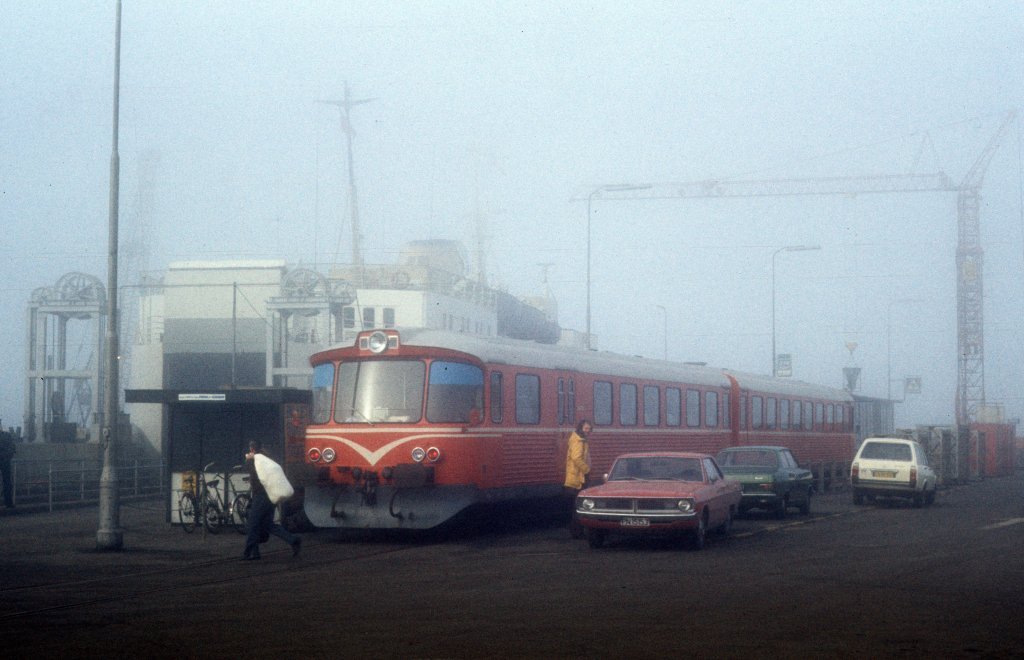
Railcar from Hjørring Privatbaner in the fog at Hirtshals ferry port in 1975.

In 1915, the Danish Parliament agreed to build a new railway line between Hjørring and Ålbæk on the Skagen Line with a possible branch line from Vellingshøj to Hirtshals. The main line to Ålbæk was never constructed however, but the branch line to Hirtshals was built instead. Construction started in April 1924, and the railway was opened on 18 December the following year.

From the start, the railway line was operated together with the Hjørring-Løkken-Aabybro Line and the Hjørring-Hørby Line in the joint operating company Hjørring Privatbaner (HP).

In 2001, the operating company Hjørring Privatbaner merged with Skagensbanen to form the railway company Nordjyske Jernbaner (NJ). Headquartered in Hjørring, the company is now responsible for running the Hjørring–Hirtshals and Frederikshavn–Skagen lines.

In 2005, the current Siemens Desiro trains, which have a maximum speed of 120 km/h (75 mph), were introduced.

== Operations ==
=== Local trains ===
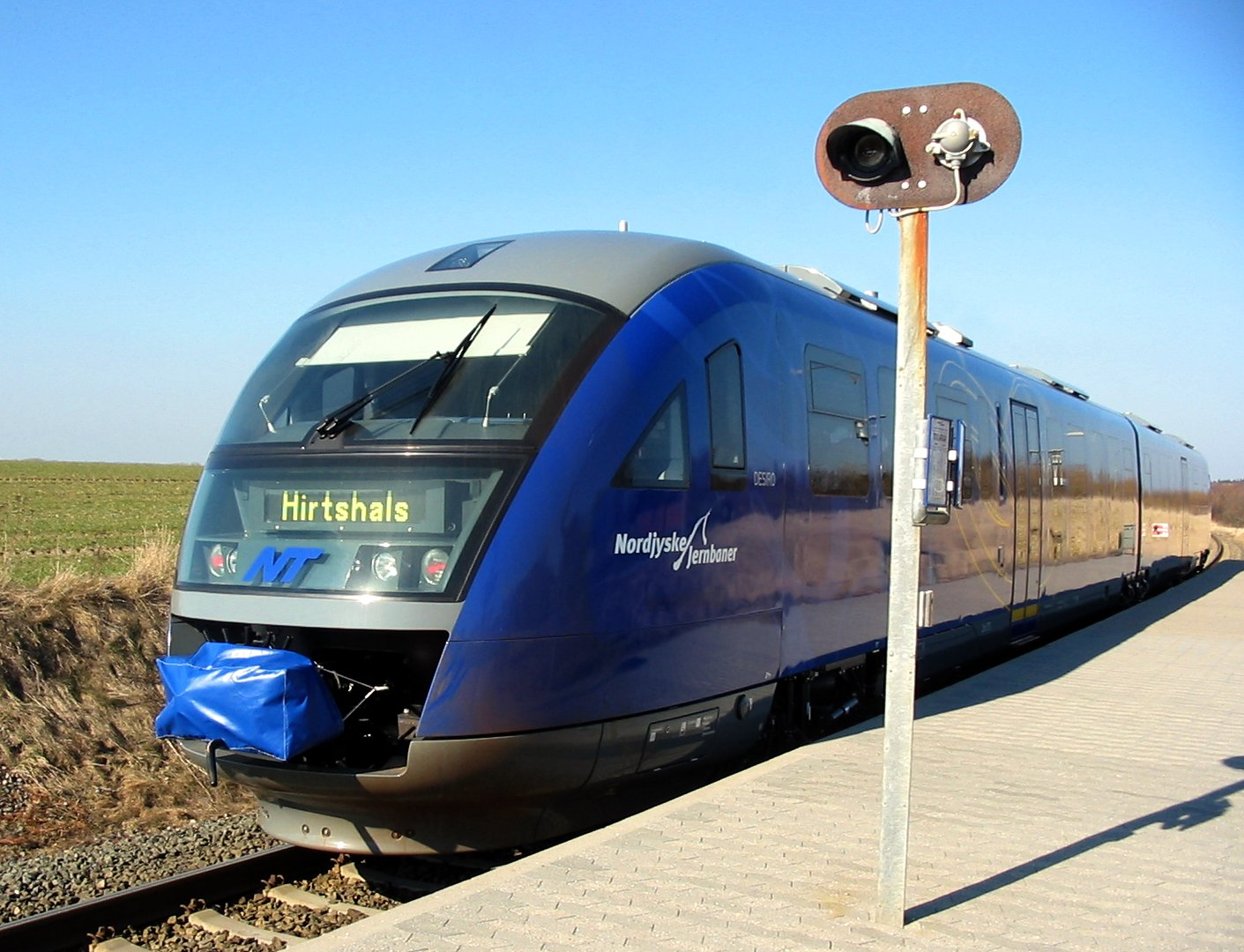
An NJ Siemens Desiro DMU at the Herregårdsparken halt between Hjørring and Hirtshals.

Nordjyske Jernbaner (NJ) runs frequent local train services from Hirtshals to Hjørring with onward connections from Hjørring to the rest of Denmark.

=== Express service ===
An international passenger service, Nordpilen, between Hirtshals and Hamburg, connecting with the ferries to and from Norway, ceased many years ago.

=== Freight ===
Apart from local passenger traffic, there are transit freight trains linking Norway to the European continent. The freight cars are transferred on the railway ferry from Hirtshals to Kristiansand.

== Stations ==
- Hjørring
- Kvægtorvet
- Teglgårdsvej
- Herregårdsparken
- Vellingshøj
- Vidstrup
- Tornby
- Horne
- Emmersbæk
- Lilleheden
- Hirtshals

=== Previous stations ===
- Color Line - between Lilleheden halt and Hirtshals station
- Raundrup - between Horne station and Tornby station
- Sønderby - between Tornby station and Vidstrup station
- Langholm - between Vellingshøj station and Vidstrup station

== See also ==
- List of railway lines in Denmark
- Skagen railway line
