= Hjørring railway station =

Railway station in Hjørring, Denmark

Hjørring
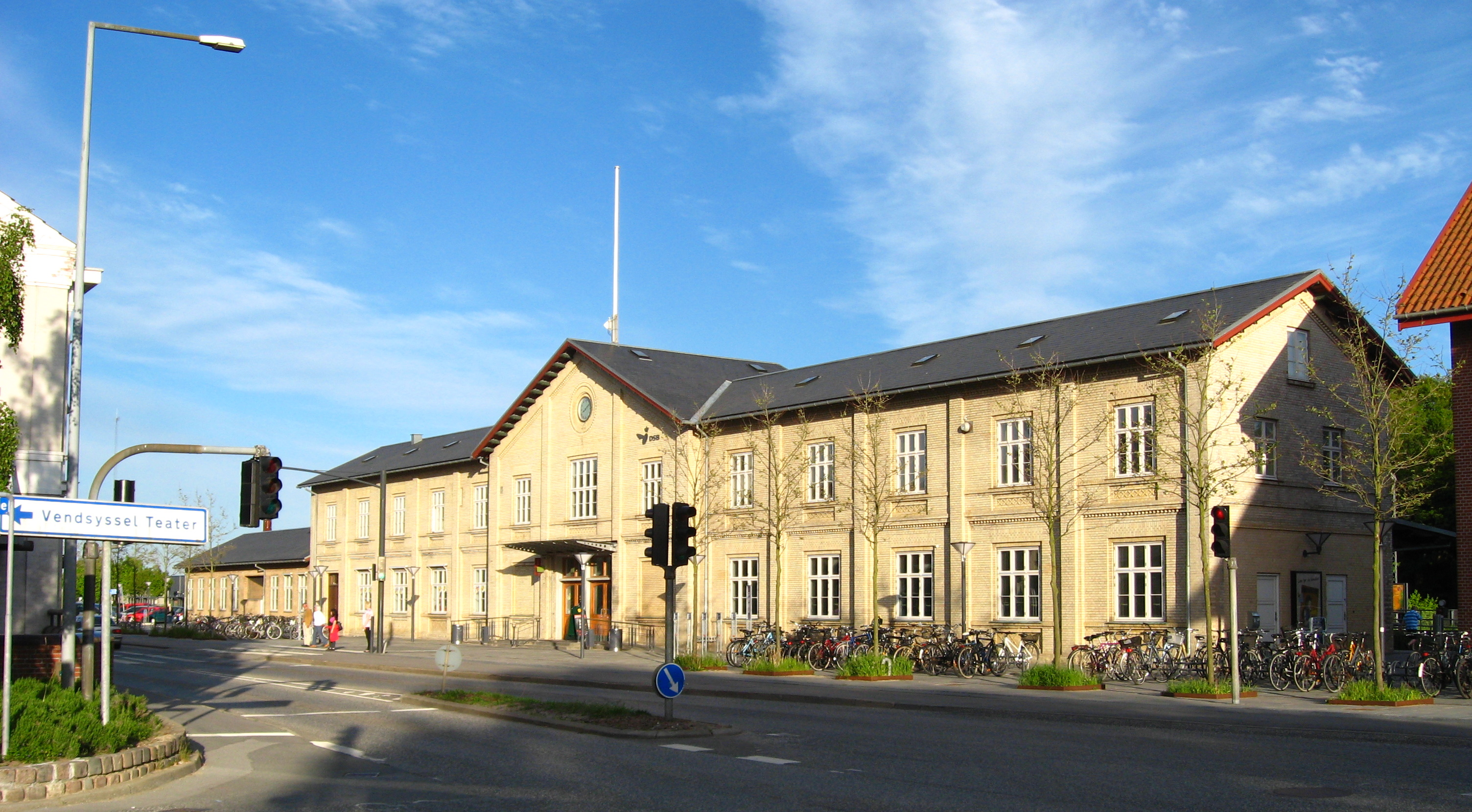
- Hjørring station in 2010

General information
- Location: Banegårdspladsen 6; 9800 Hjørring; Hjørring Municipality; Denmark
- Coordinates: 57°27′23″N 9°59′08″E
- Elevation: 34.4 metres (113 ft)
- System: Railway junction
- Owner: DSB (station infrastructure); Banedanmark (rail infrastructure)
- Lines: Vendsyssel Line (since 1871); Hirtshals Line (since 1942); Hjørring–Løkken-Aabybro (1942–1963); Hjørring–Hørby (1942–1953)
- Platforms: 2
- Tracks: 3
- Train operators: Nordjyske Jernbaner

Construction
- Architect: Thomas Arboe

History
- Opened: 1871

Services
Preceding station	Nordjyske Jernbaner	Following station
Vrå towards Hobro	Hobro – Skagen Regional train	Hjørring East towards Skagen
Terminus	Hjørring – Hirtshals Local train	Kvægtorvet towards Hirtshals
Vrå towards Skørping	Skørping – Hirtshals Regional train Peak hours	Kvægtorvet towards Hirtshals
Terminus	Hjørring – Skagen Local train Peak hours	Hjørring East towards Skagen
Location
- Location within Denmark

Hjørring railway station (Danish: Hjørring Banegård) is the main railway station serving the town of Hjørring in Vendsyssel, Denmark. It is located in the central part of the town, on the southern edge of the historic town centre, and immediately adjacent to the Hjørring bus station.

Hjørring station is located on the Vendsyssel Line from Aalborg to Frederikshavn and is the terminus of the Hirtshalsbanen railway line from Hjørring to Hirtshals. The station opened in 1871. It offers direct regional rail services to Aalborg and Frederikshavn, as well as local train services to Hirtshals, both operated by Nordjyske Jernbaner.

== History ==
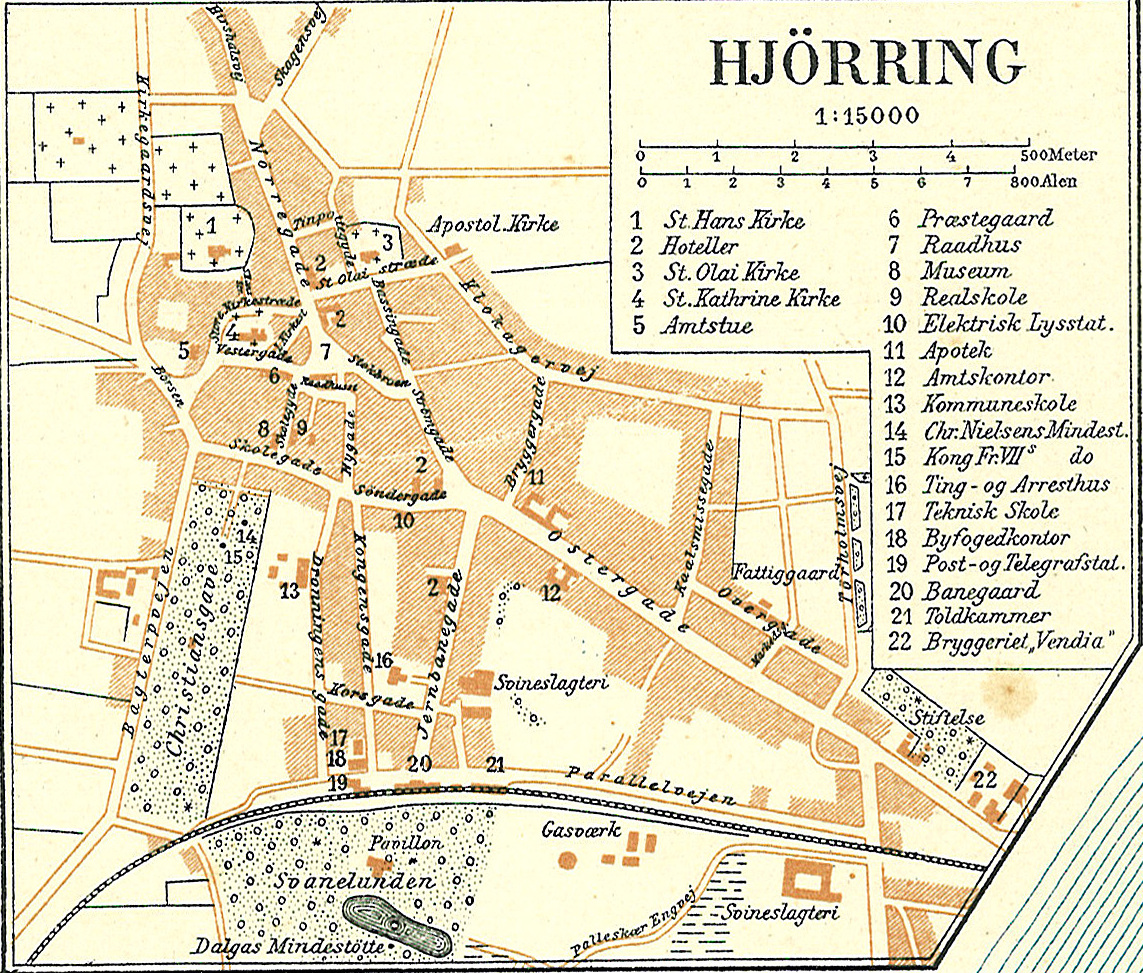
Map of Hjørring, c. 1900.

The station opened in 1871 as the branch from Nørresundby to Frederikshavn of the new Nørresundby-Frederikshavn railway line opened on 16 August 1871. The station building was designed by the architect Thomas Arboe.

On 7 January 1879, at the opening of the Limfjord Railway Bridge, the Vendsyssel line was connected with Aalborg station, the Randers-Aalborg railway line and the rest of the Danish rail network.

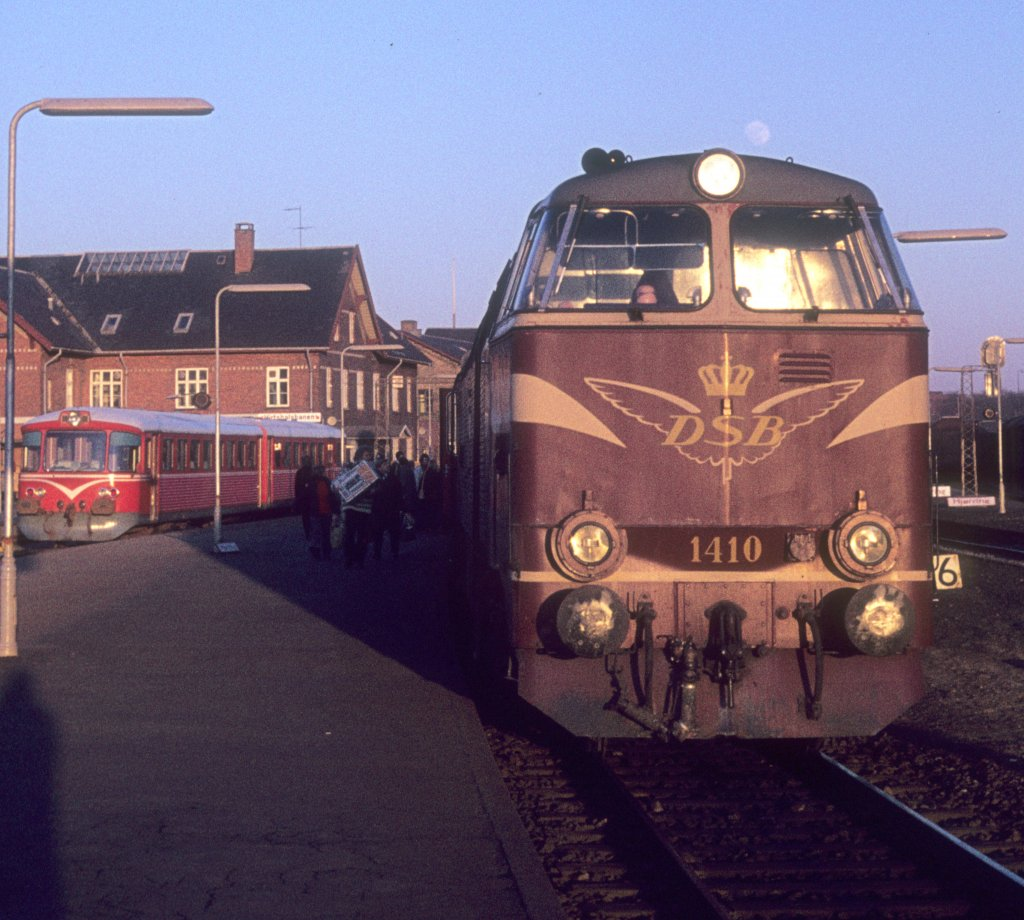
DSB train on the Vendsyssel Line calling at Hjørring in 1975. To the left a local train ready to depart for Hirtshals.

In 1942, the station became the terminal station of the Hjørring-Løkken-Aabybro Line, the Hjørring-Hørby Line and the Hjørring-Hirtshals Line, as the trains from Hjørring Privatbaner were moved from Hjørring West station to the mainline station. The Hjørring-Hørby Line was closed in 1953 and the Hjørring-Løkken-Aabybro Line in 1963, so that today only the Hirtshals Line remains as the only branch line from Hjørring Station.

In 2017, operation of the regional rail services on the Vendsyssel Line to Aalborg and Frederikshavn were transferred from the national railway company DSB to the regional railway company Nordjyske Jernbaner (NJ).

== Facilities ==
Inside the station building there is a combined ticket office and convenience store operated by 7-Eleven, waiting room, toilets and lockers.

Adjacent to the station is the Hjørring bus station. The station forecourt has a taxi stand, and the station also has a bicycle parking station as well as a car park with approximately 66 parking spaces.

== Services ==
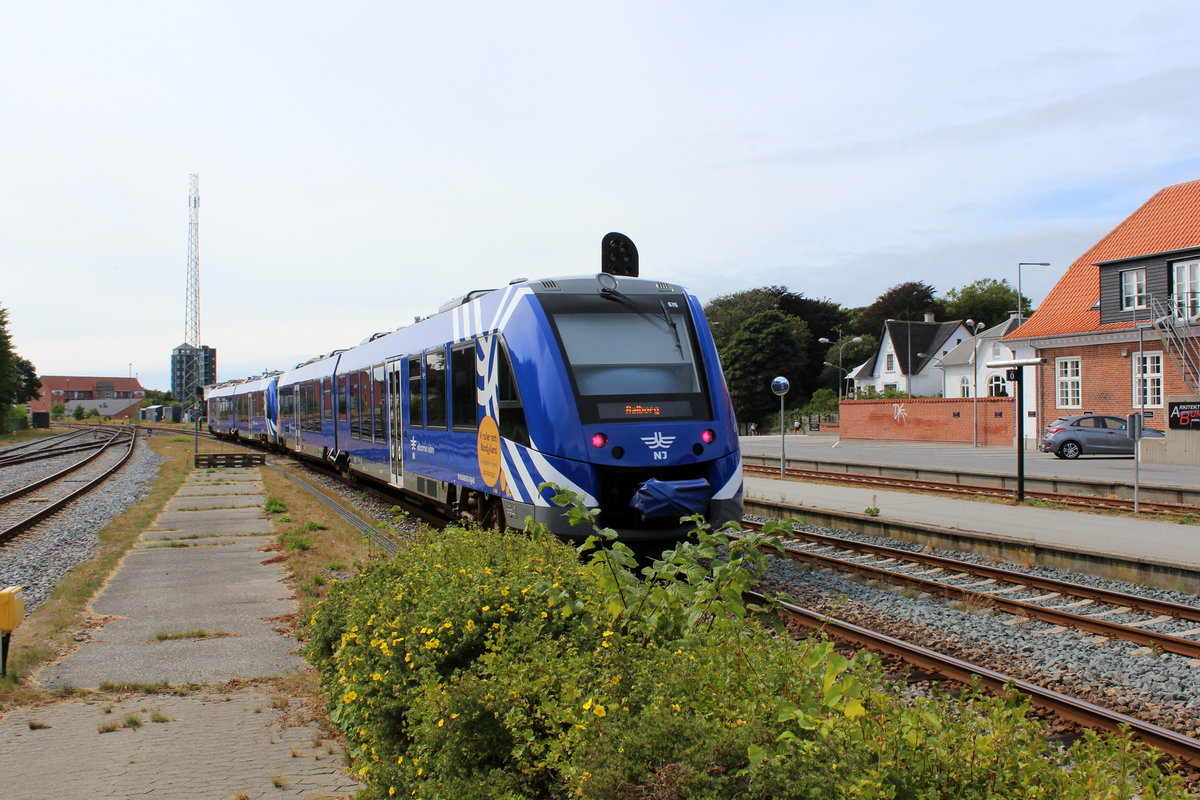
A DMU to Aalborg from Nordjyske Jernbaner calling at Hjørring station in 2018.

The station offers direct regional rail services to Aalborg and Frederikshavn, as well as local train services to Hirtshals, both operated by Nordjyske Jernbaner.

An international passenger service, Nordpilen, between Frederikshavn / Hirtshals and Hamburg, connecting with the ferries to and from Sweden and Norway, ceased many years ago. Until the opening of the Great Belt Bridge in 1997, DSB also operated a night train service with sleeping cars from Hjørring to Copenhagen. The direct InterCity service from the station to Copenhagen operated by the national railway company DSB ceased in 2019.

== Cultural references ==
Hjørring station is used as a location in the 1976 Bodil Award-winning Danish film Den korte sommer.

== See also ==
- List of railway stations in Denmark
- Rail transport in Denmark
- History of rail transport in Denmark
- Transport in Denmark
