= Hirtshals =

- Town
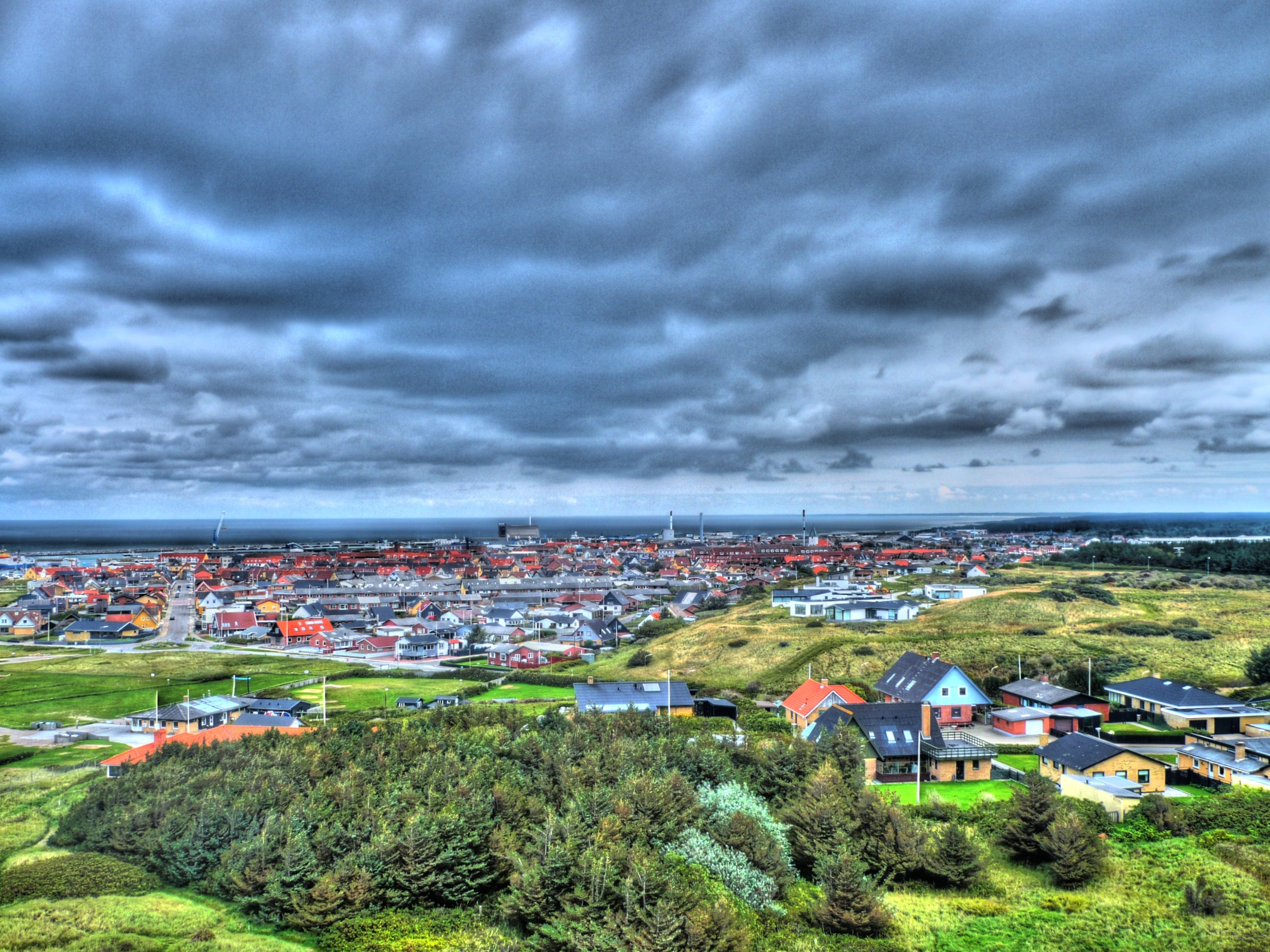
- Hirtshals

- Location in Denmark Hirtshals (North Jutland Region)
- Coordinates: 57°35′N 09°57′E
- Country: Denmark
- Region: North Denmark
- Municipality: Hjørring
- Settled: 1860, when the Lighthouse was built
- Incorporated (city): 1919-1931

Area
  - Urban: 4.43 km^{2} (1.71 sq mi)
- Elevation: 90 m (300 ft)

Population (1 January 2026)
  - Urban: 5,265
  - Urban density: 1,190/km^{2} (3,080/sq mi)
  - Gender: 2,659 males and 2,606 females
- Demonym: Hirtshalsenser or Hirtshalsboer
- Time zone: UTC+1 (Central European Time)
  - Summer (DST): UTC+2 (European Summer Time)
- Postal code: DK-9850 Hirtshals
- Website: Hjørring Municipality

Hirtshals is a town and seaport on the coast of Skagerrak on the island of Vendsyssel-Thy at the top of the Jutland peninsula in northern Denmark. It is located in Hjørring municipality in Region Nordjylland. The town of Hirtshals has a population of 5,265 (1 January 2026). Located on the Skagerrak, it is especially known for its fishing and ferry harbours.

Hirtshals is a relatively new town which was planned from 1919 and built in the 1920s and 1930s in connection with the construction of the artificial harbour, which was built between 1919 and 1931.

== History ==
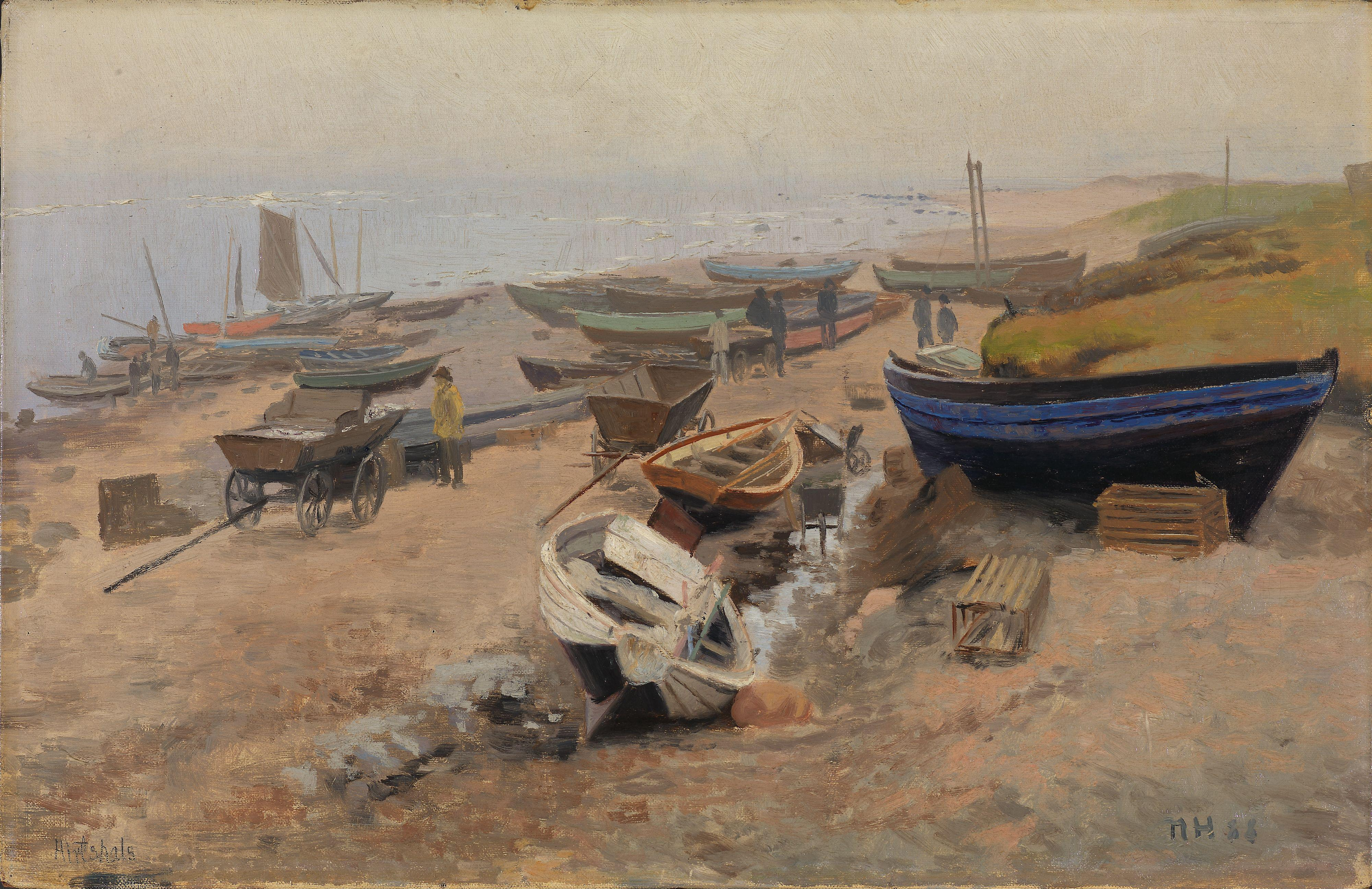
Fishing boats on the beach at Hirtshals. Painting by the Norwegian painter Nils Hansteen from 1888.

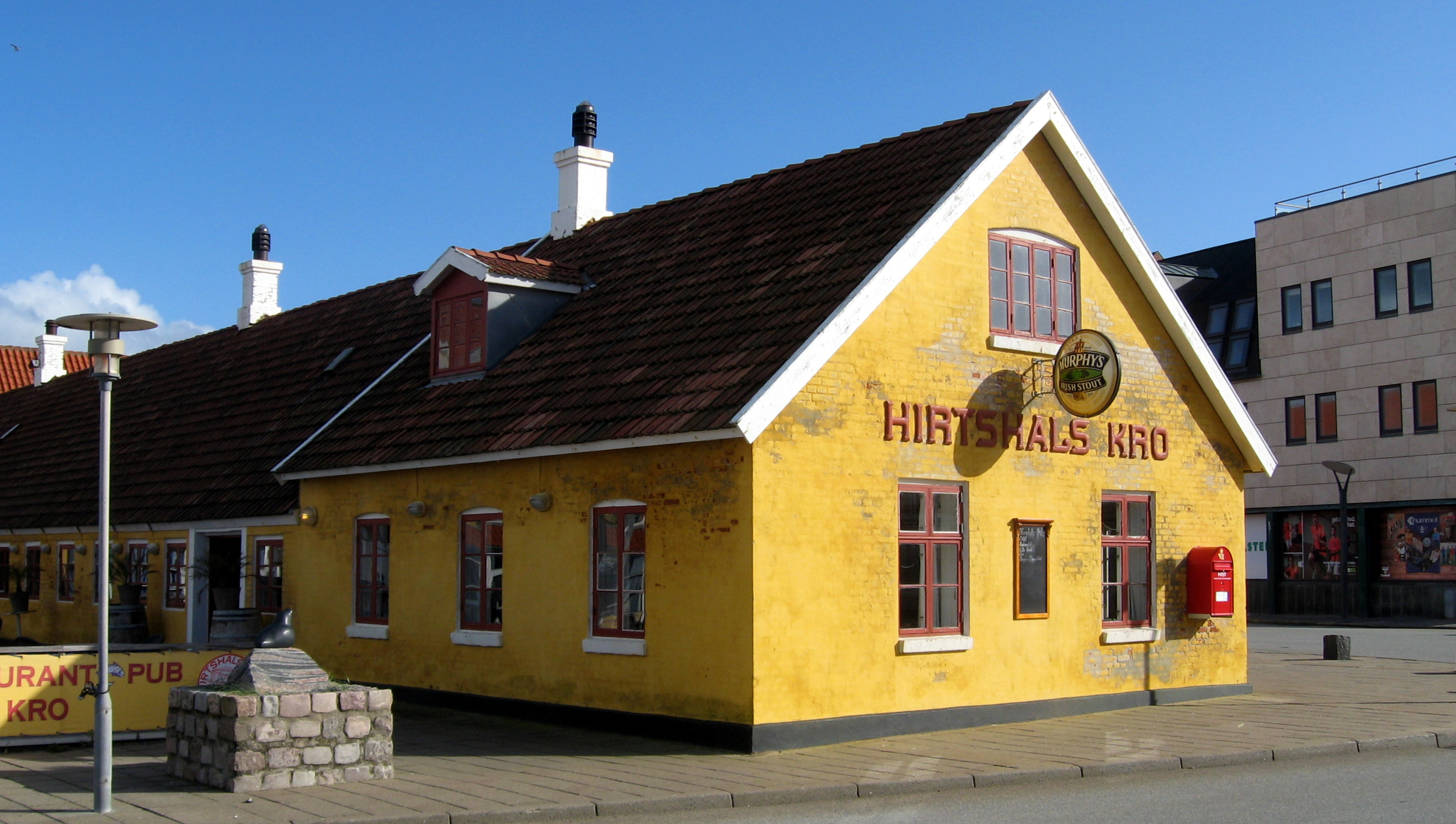
The historic inn Hirtshals Kro in the town centre. The building dates from 1840.

Originally the site of a small fishing settlement known as Hirshals or Lilleheden, the location at the promontory by the Skagerak between the Jammer Bay and the Tannis Bay meant that a lighthouse was built on the site early on: Hirtshals Lighthouse which was constructed between 1860 and 1863.

The town of Hirtshals itself developed around the artificial harbour which was constructed between 1919 and 1931. In 1919, an architectural competition was held for the city plan for a new port city at Hirtshals; it was won by the Danish architects and urban planners Steen Eiler Rasmussen and Knud Christiansen. In 1925, the Hjørring–Hirtshals railway line opened to link the port of Hirtshals with the Danish rail network.

In 1966, the harbour was expanded and became one of the largest fishing ports in Denmark.

On 8 September 1989, Partnair Flight 394 crashed off the coast of Hirtshals killing all 55 passengers on board making it the worst in Denmark's history.

Until 1 January 2007, Hirtshals was also the seat of Hirtshals Municipality which was merged with existing Hjørring, Løkken-Vrå, and Sindal municipalities to form an enlarged Hjørring Municipality.

== Geography ==
=== Topography ===
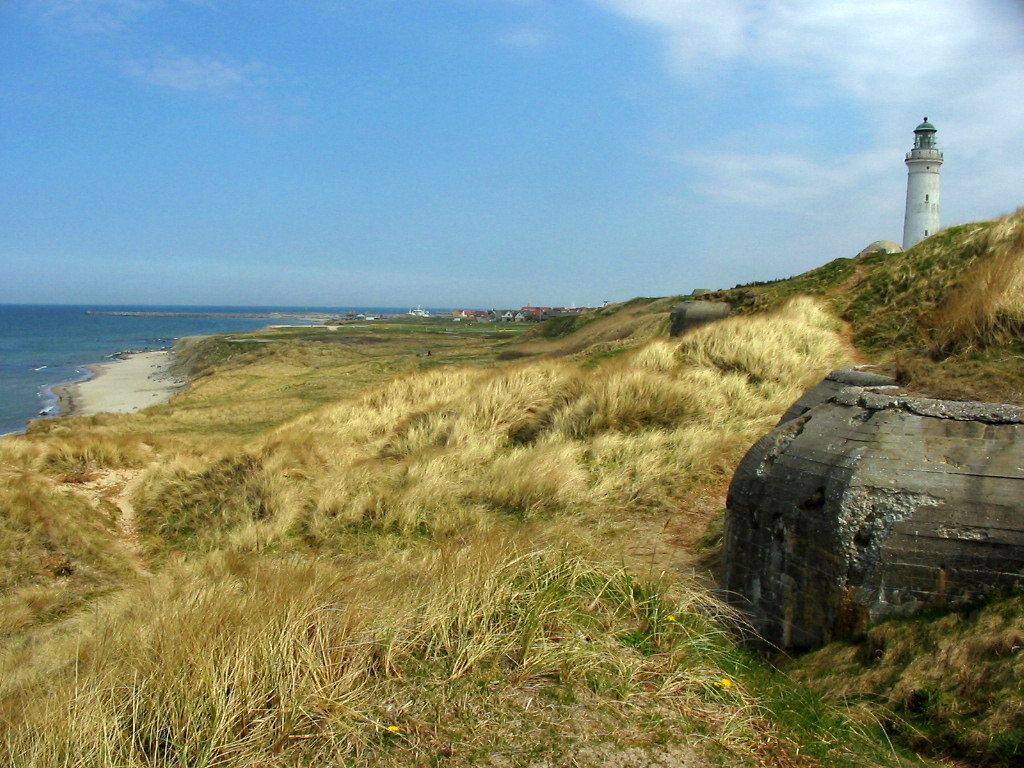
The nature of Hirtshals: the beach, the cliffs, the North Sea and the history: the bunkers and the lighthouse.

Hirtshals is located on the sand and clay promontory Hirtshals, overlooking the Skagerrak between the Jammer Bay and the Tannis Bay. The shoreline is backed by low cliffs, beneath which is a narrow and rocky beach.

=== Climate ===
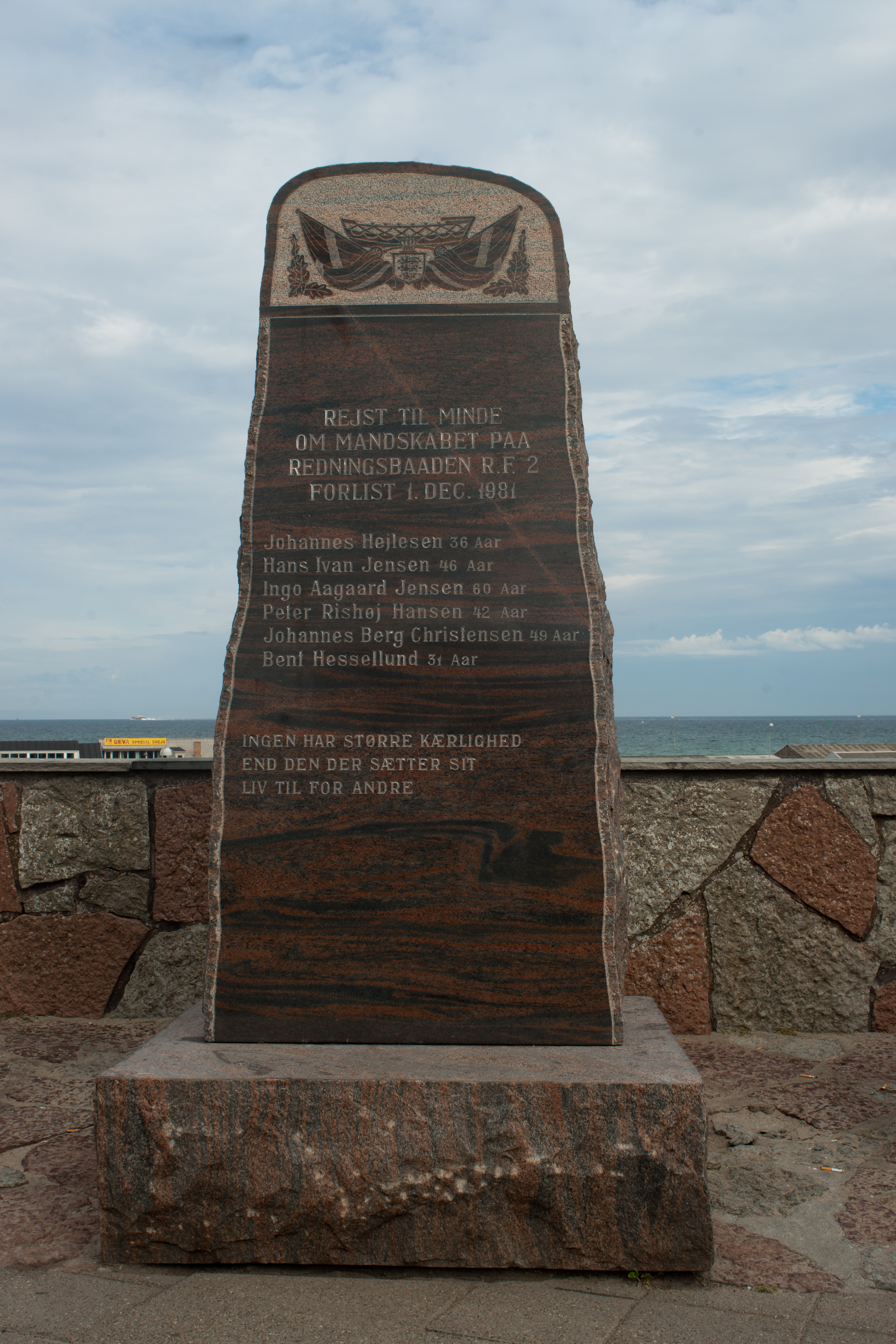
Memorial in Hirtshals to the crew of lifeboat RF 2, sunk in 1981.

The sea level has been as high as 1 metre over the norm. But in days where there is no wind, the waves typically will not be higher than maximum 20 cm (8 in) over normal sea level.

Due to the proximity of the town to the coast, sea fog is not an uncommon occurrence. In the winter, the air temperature can fall as low as 1.6 degrees, but in the summer, it can reach over 25 degrees Celsius.

==== Waves ====
Hirtshals Havnekontor (Hirtshals' Harbour Office) keeps track of wave periods. Annual wave periods fluctuate between half a second, up to about 9 seconds. According to Hirtshals Havnekontor (Hirtshals' Harbour Office) normal wave heights are between 2 and 2.5 metres.

==== Wind ====
The prevailing wind in Hirtshals is to the south or south-west. Wind speeds vary all year long, usually topping at 10 m/s during the winter.

== Cityscape ==
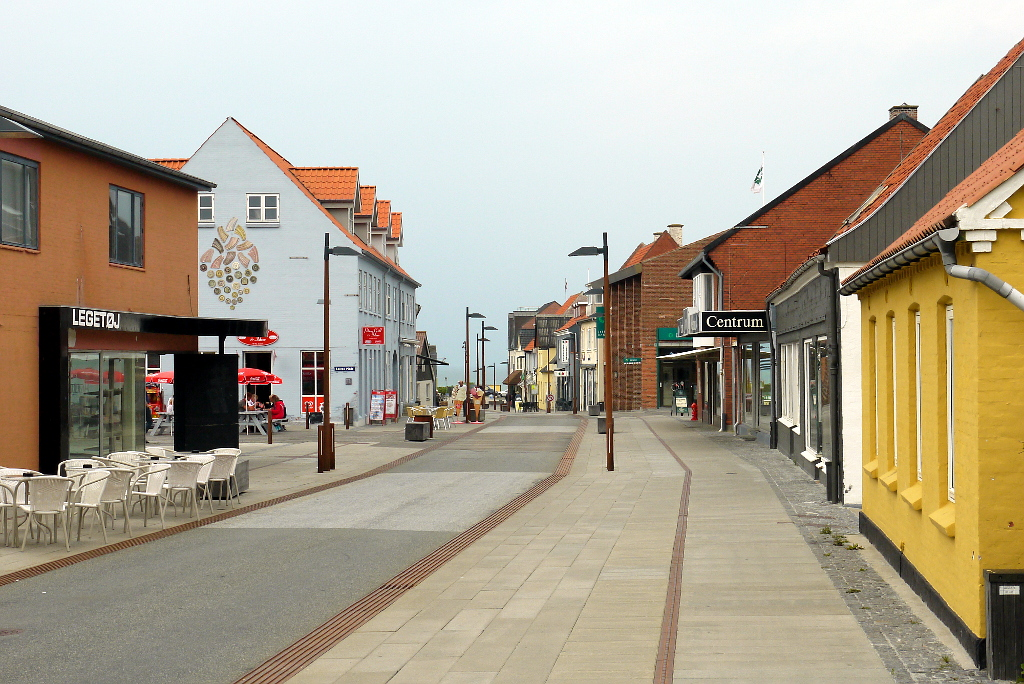
The pedestrian street Nørregade in Hirtshals

=== Hirtshals Lighthouse ===
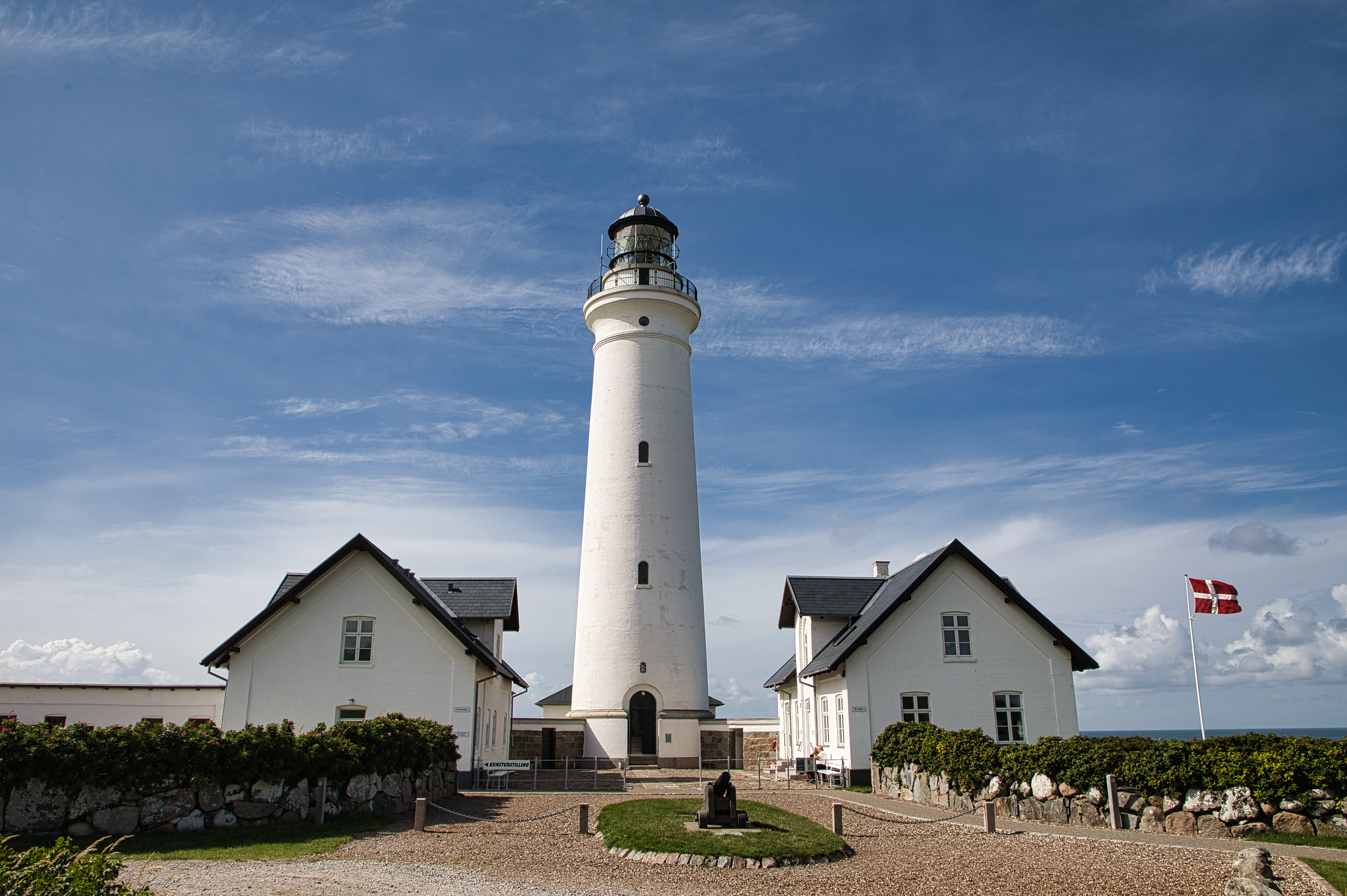
Hirtshals Lighthouse

The town's 35-metre-high lighthouse, Hirtshals Lighthouse (Danish: Hirtshals Fyr), is a local landmark. Construction was begun on 28 June 1860, and it was first lit on 1 January 1863. It was built to designs by the Danish architect Niels Sigfred Nebelong. It is constructed of red brick and covered with Dutch tile.

== Economy ==
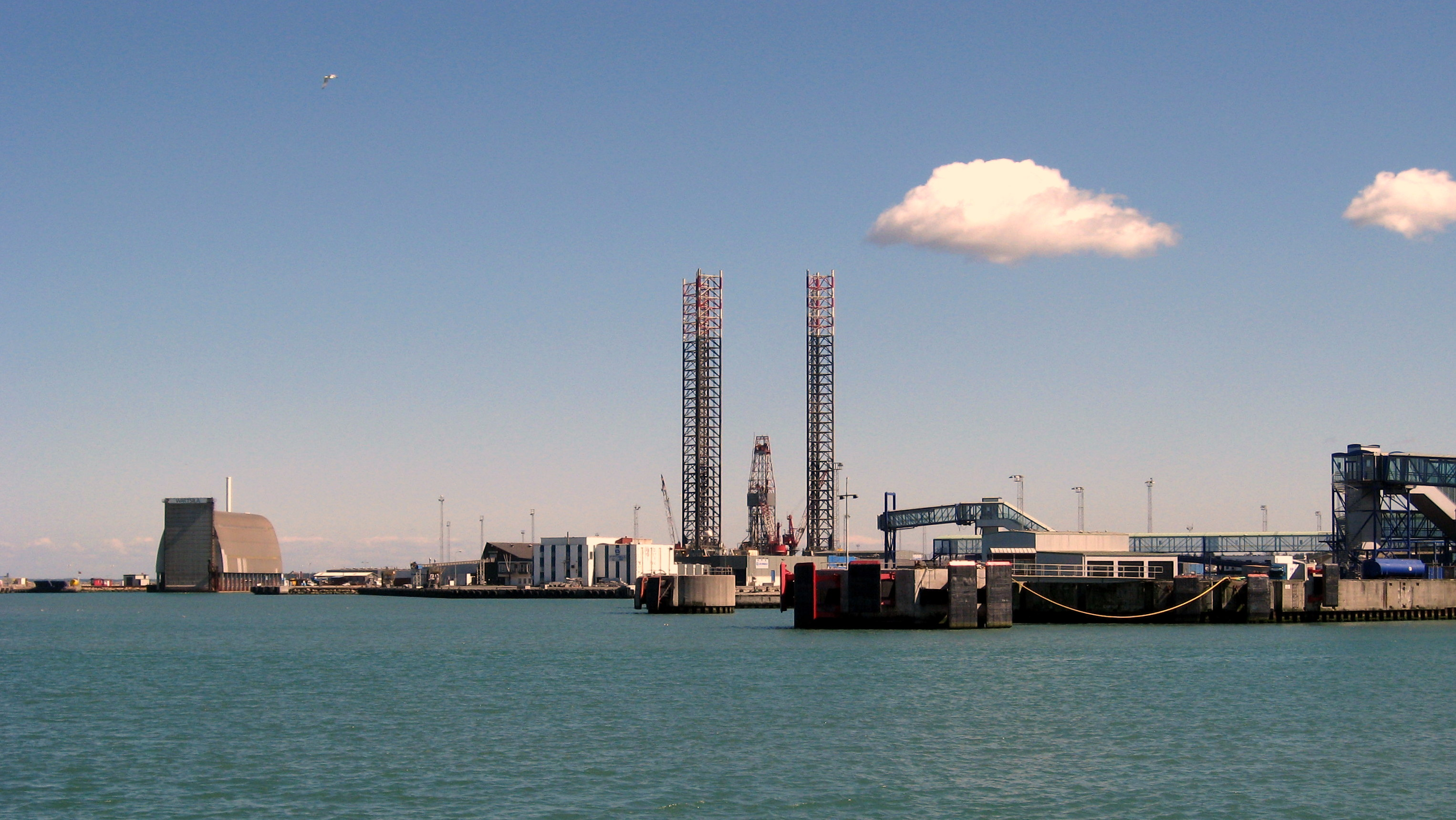
Drilling rig MAERSK GUARDIAN during renovation in Hirtshals

Fishing plays a big role for the town and its inhabitants, as does tourism and the renting of summer homes. Due to the ferry connections with Norway, the shops in Hirtshals thrive on the large number of visitors, especially Norwegians, who shop in the small town all year long. Hirtshals also provides good employment in manufacturing industries like ‘Jackson, Lilleheden and Scanvogn’.

== Culture ==
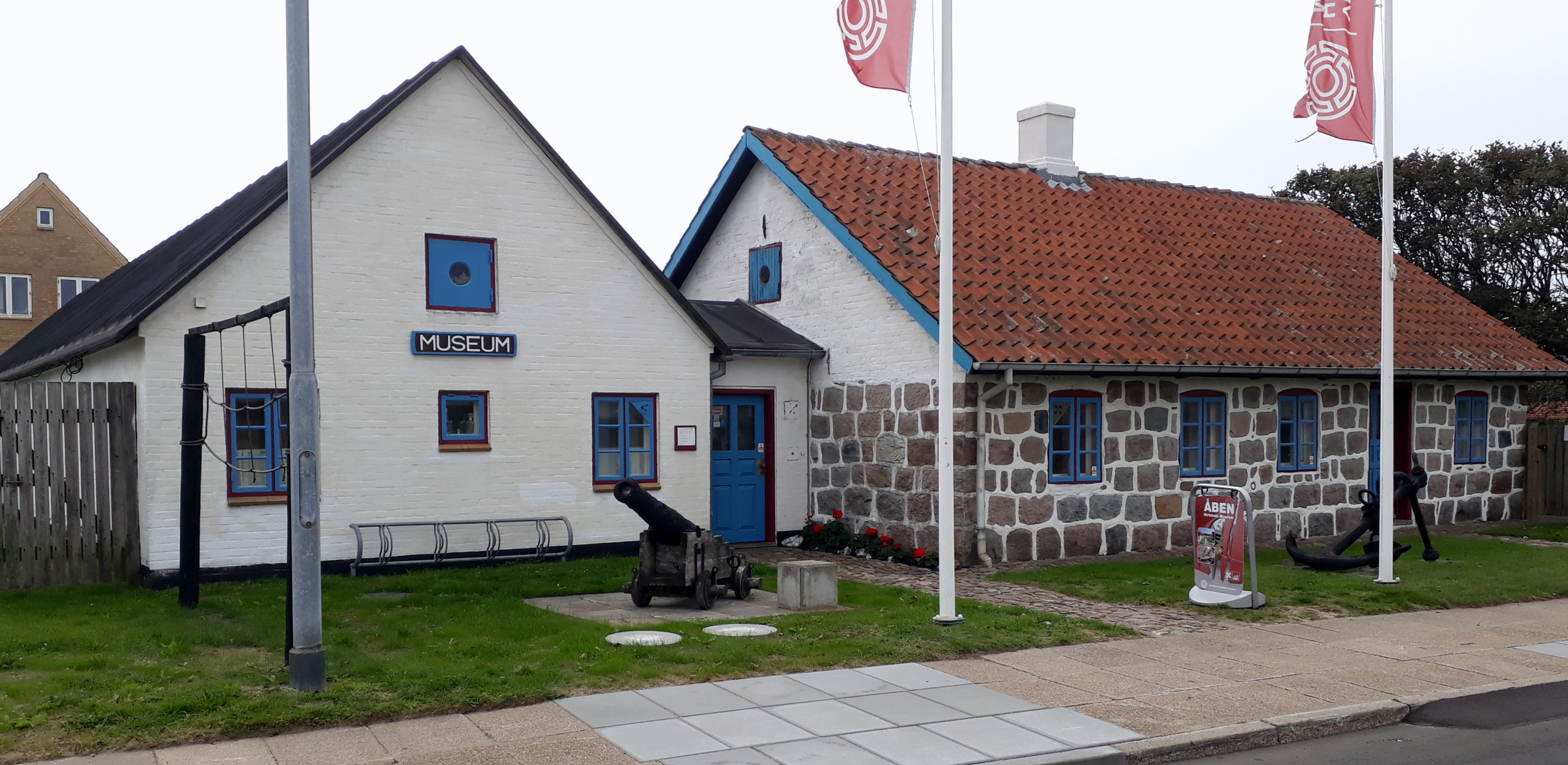
The Hirtshals Museum

Hirtshals is the site of Hirtshals Museum, a local cultural history museum which focuses on the history of the town of Hirtshals.

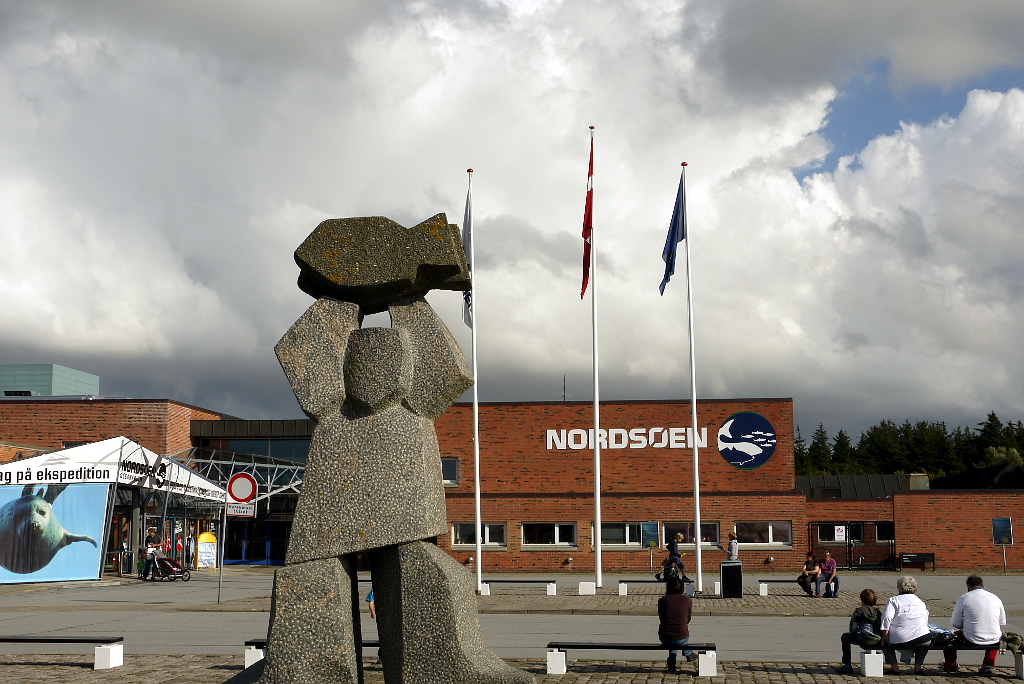
The Nordsøen Oceanarium aquarium

Hirtshals is also the home of one of the largest aquariums in Europe, the Nordsøen Oceanarium. This was built in 1984 as Nordsømuseet, The North Sea Museum, and got its present name after it was extended in 1998 to include a fish tank containing 4.5 million litres of water, making it the largest in northern Europe. The Oceanarium has 70 different species in its collection. A fire in December 2003 destroyed the new extension, but it was rebuilt and reopened on 22 July 2005.

The 2014 Danish film The Sunfish is set in Hirtshals.

== Transportation and infrastructure ==
=== Port of Hirtshals ===
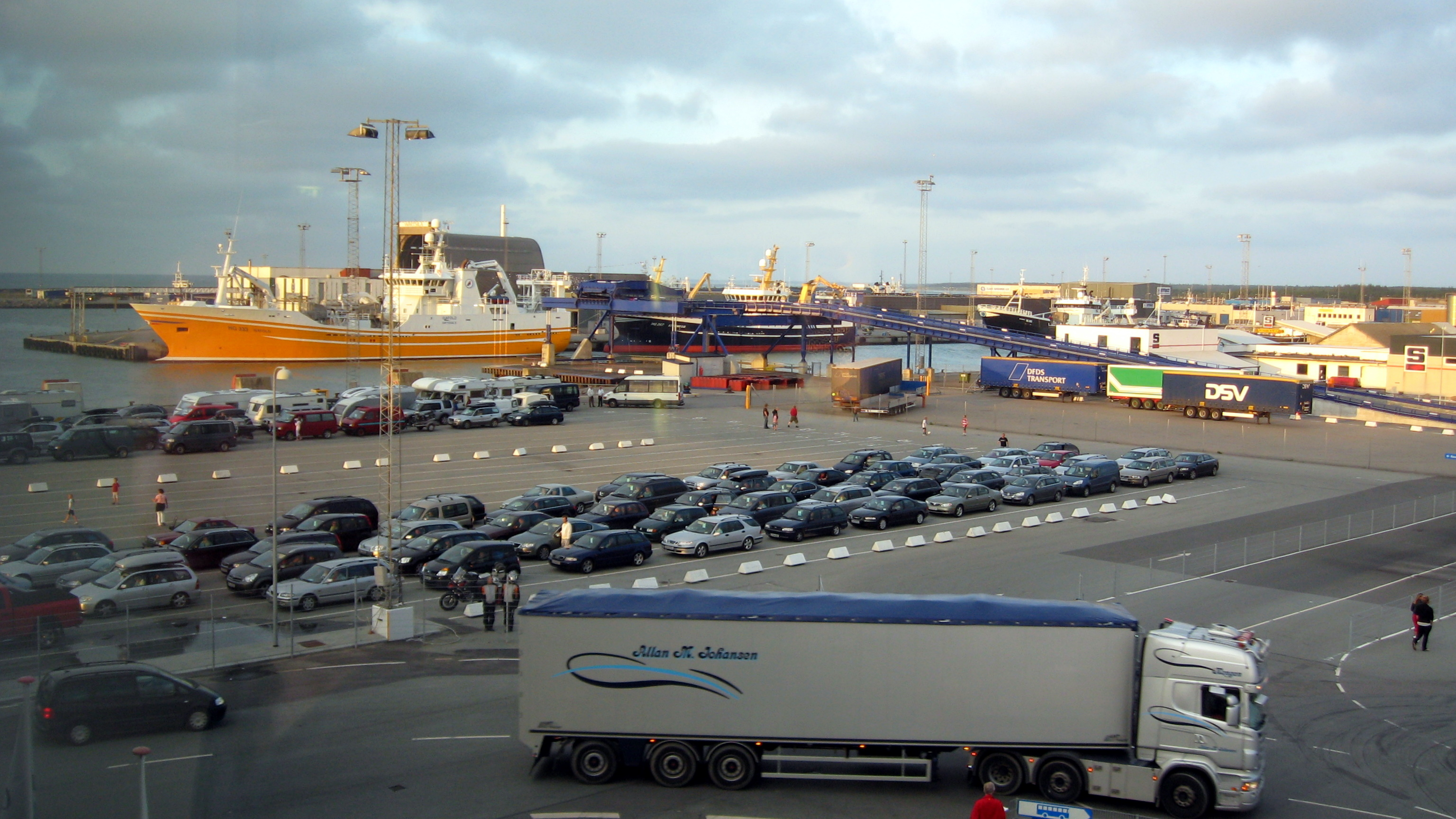
Port of Hirtshals

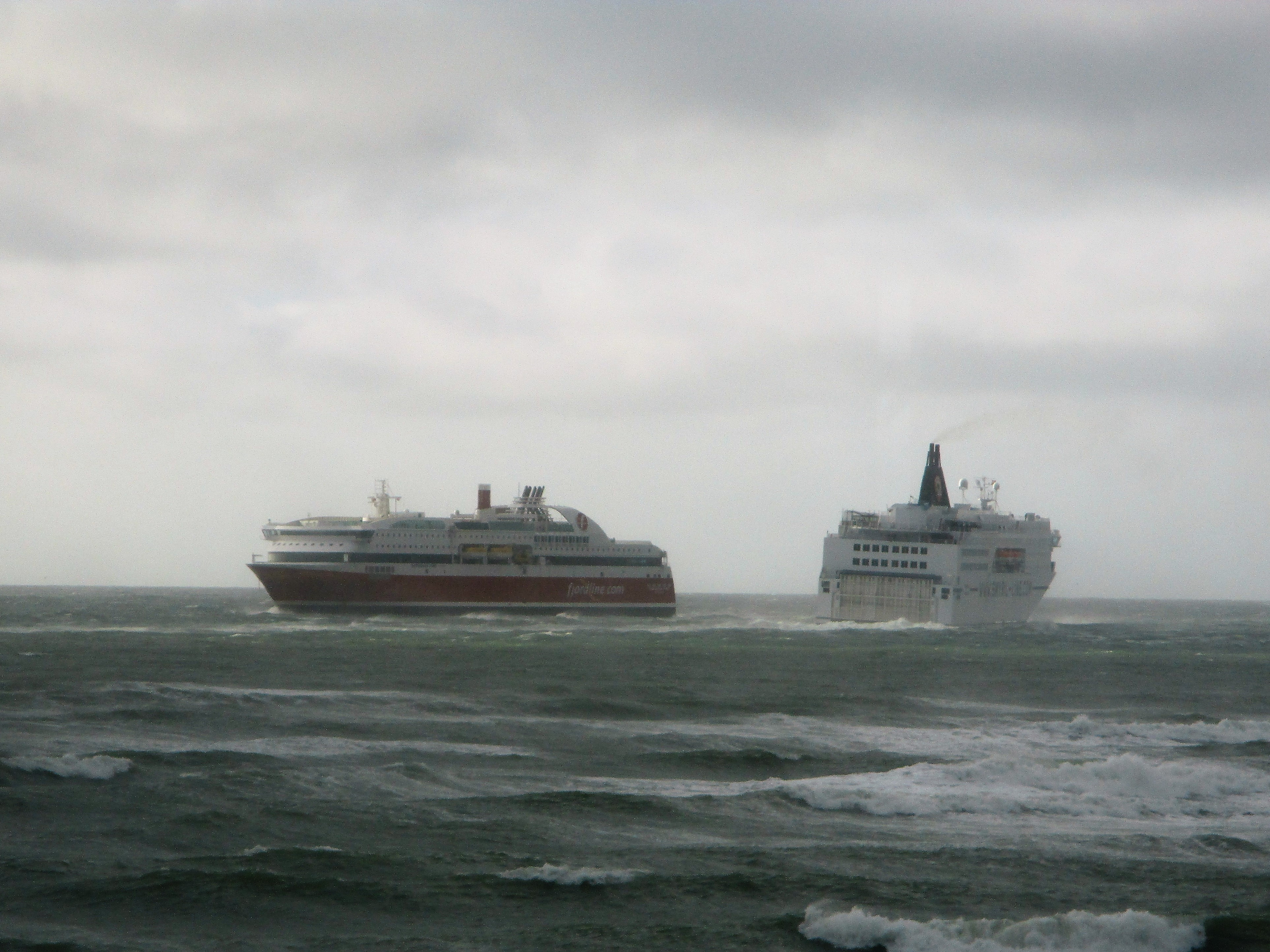
MS Norröna leaving Hirtshals while MS Bergensfjord is arriving. Credit: Marius Vassnes

Hirtshals is the Danish terminal for the services of the Norwegian ferry company, Color Line. Each year thousands of tourists travel back and forth between Hirtshals and the Norwegian cities of Kristiansand and Larvik. Previously, Color Line also offered services to Bergen, Stavanger and Oslo, but decided to stop operating these routes in early 2008. Another ferry operator, Fjord Line, now operates a route to Bergen, Stavanger, Kristiansand and Langesund. It has also been possible since autumn 2010 to travel to Tórshavn in the Faroe Islands and to Seyðisfjörður in Iceland with Smyril Line. The port has LNG facilities for the ferries, and hosts the first wind farm built without subsidies.

=== Rail transport ===
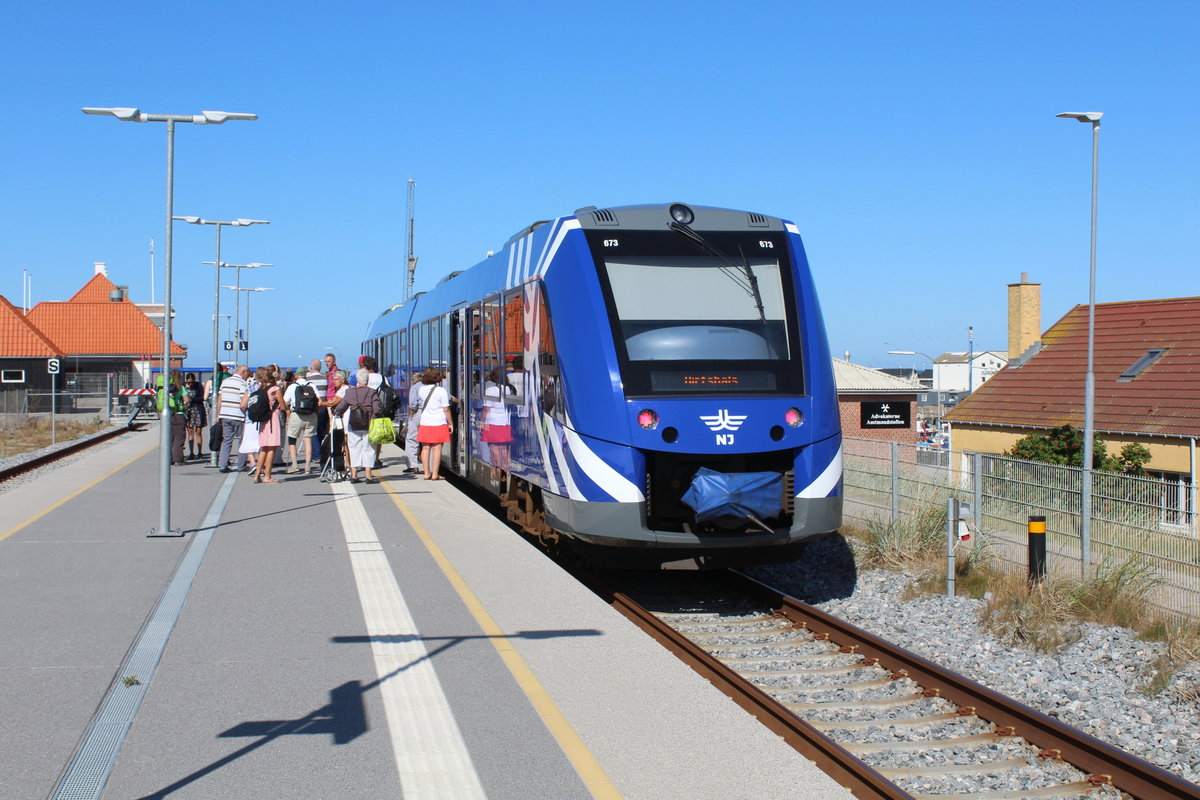
A DMU from Nordjyske Jernbaner arriving to Hirtshals from Hjørring in 2018.

The Hirtshals railway line connects Hirtshals with Hjørring and the rest of the Danish rail network. Hirtshals railway station is the principal railway station of the town, and is located in the central part of the town between the town centre and the Port of Hirtshals. The town is also served by the railway halts Lilleheden and Emmersbæk.

=== Road transport ===
Hirtshals is located on the European route E39 which connects the town to Aalborg in the south. Hirtshals is the northern end of E39 in Denmark which continues to Trondheim in Norway on the other side of the Skagerrak. The Danish national road 55 also connects the town with Aalborg along the coast of the Jammer Bay.

== Notable people ==
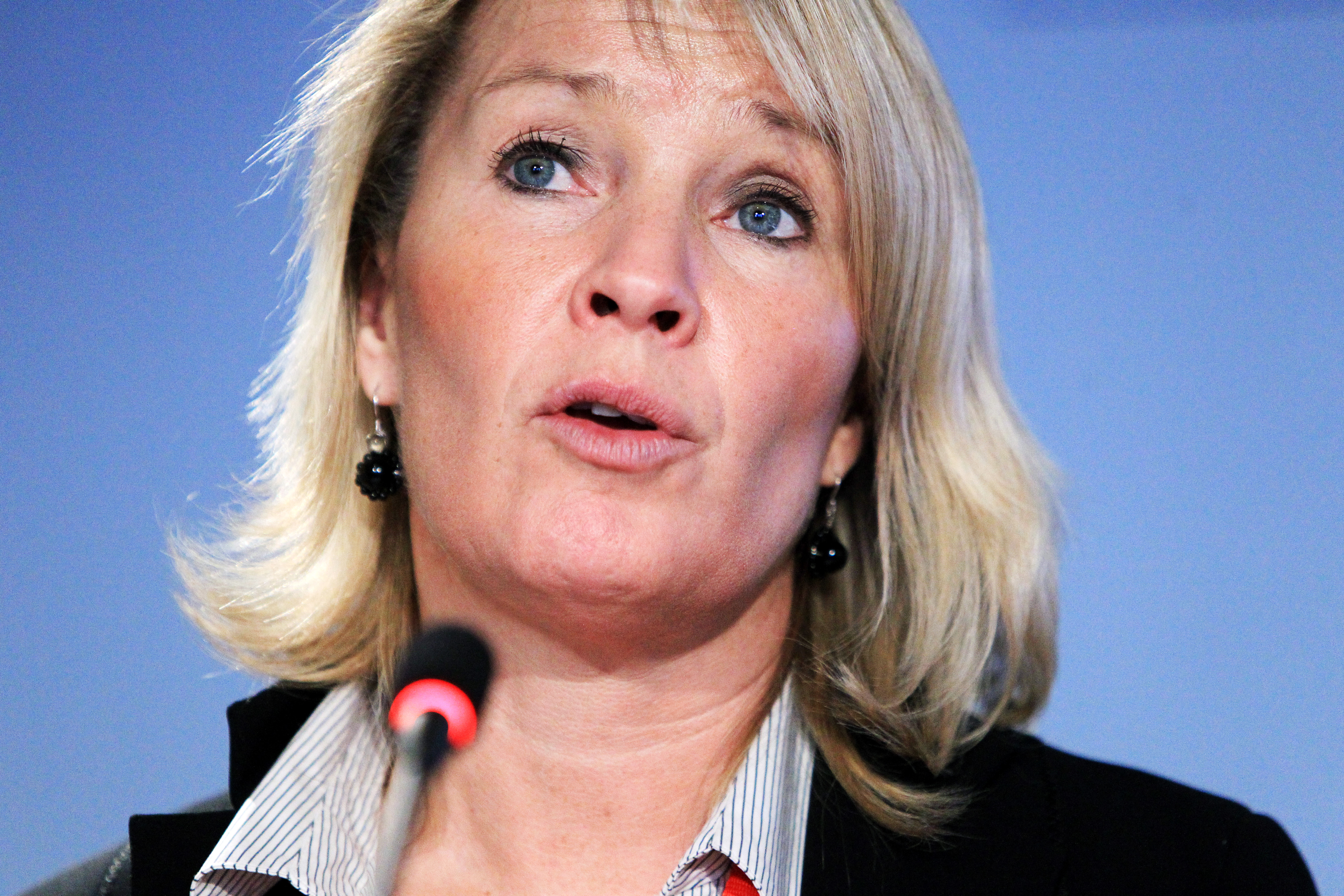
Lene Espersen

- Niels Hausgaard (born 1944 in Hirtshals) singer, songwriter and comedian
- Kim Lynge Pedersen (born 1965 in Hirtshals) a Danish weightlifter, competed in the 1992 Summer Olympics
- Lene Espersen (born 1965 in Hirtshals) former politician, Deputy Prime Minister 2008/2011
- Louise Jensen (1971 in Hirtshals – 1994) a tour guide working in Cyprus, murdered by three British soldiers
- Simon Mathew (born 1984 in Hirtshals) pop singer
- Dodo and the Dodos (begun in 1986) pop band on Danish radio stations in the 1980s
- Patrick Pedersen (born 1991 in Hirtshals) footballer, plays as a striker for Valur

== Local radio ==
- Skaga FM, formerly known as Radio Hirtshals, is a local radio station that plays domestic and foreign hits from the 1980s, 1990s and onwards, and reports on current events happening within the municipality of Hjørring. MHz: 105.6 FM.
- Since early 2010, local ferry operator Color Line (serves two ferry routes between Hirtshals and Norway) have had their own radio station, Color Radio, that plays popular songs from mostly the 1980s and 1990s. It also gives passengers from Hirtshals to Norway information about the next departure, and when check-in closes. The radio can be heard all over Hirtshals town, and from the motorway roundabout near Aabyen at the E39. MHz: 95.3 FM.
