= Hirtshals railway station =

Railway station in Hirtshals, Denmark

Hirtshals
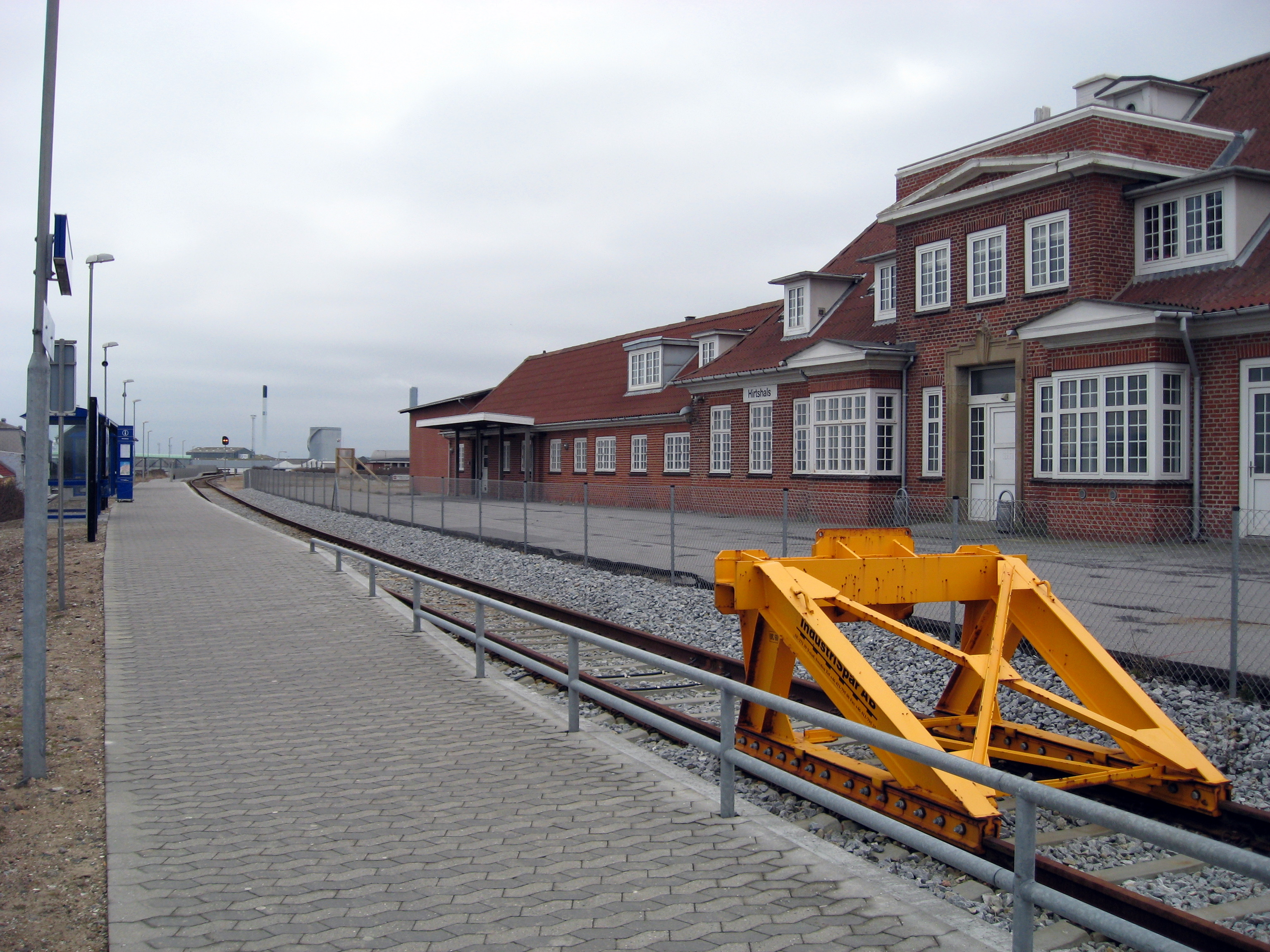
- Platform facade of Hirtshals station

General information
- Location: Banegårdspladsen 3; 9850 Hirtshals; Hjørring Municipality; Denmark
- Coordinates: 57°35′30.46″N 9°57′42.15″E
- Elevation: 8.2 metres (27 ft)
- Owner: Nordjyske Jernbaner
- Line: Hirtshals Line
- Platforms: 1
- Tracks: 2
- Train operators: Nordjyske Jernbaner

History
- Opened: 1925
- Rebuilt: 1939

Services
| Preceding station | Nordjyske Jernbaner | Following station |
|---|---|---|
| Lilleheden towards Hjørring | Hjørring – Hirtshals Local train | Terminus |
| Lilleheden towards Skørping | Skørping – Hirtshals Regional train Peak hours | Terminus |
Location
- Location within Denmark Location within North Jutland Region

Hirtshals railway station (Danish: Hirtshals Station or Hirtshals Banegård) is the main railway station serving the town of Hirtshals in Vendsyssel, Denmark. It is located in the central part of the town, and is situated between the town centre and the Port of Hirtshals.

The station is the northern terminus of the Hirtshalsbanen railway line from Hjørring to Hirtshals. The station opened in 1925 and was moved to its current location in 1928. The train services are currently operated by Nordjyske Jernbaner which run frequent local train services between Hirtshals and Hjørring with onward connections from Hjørring to the rest of Denmark.

== History ==
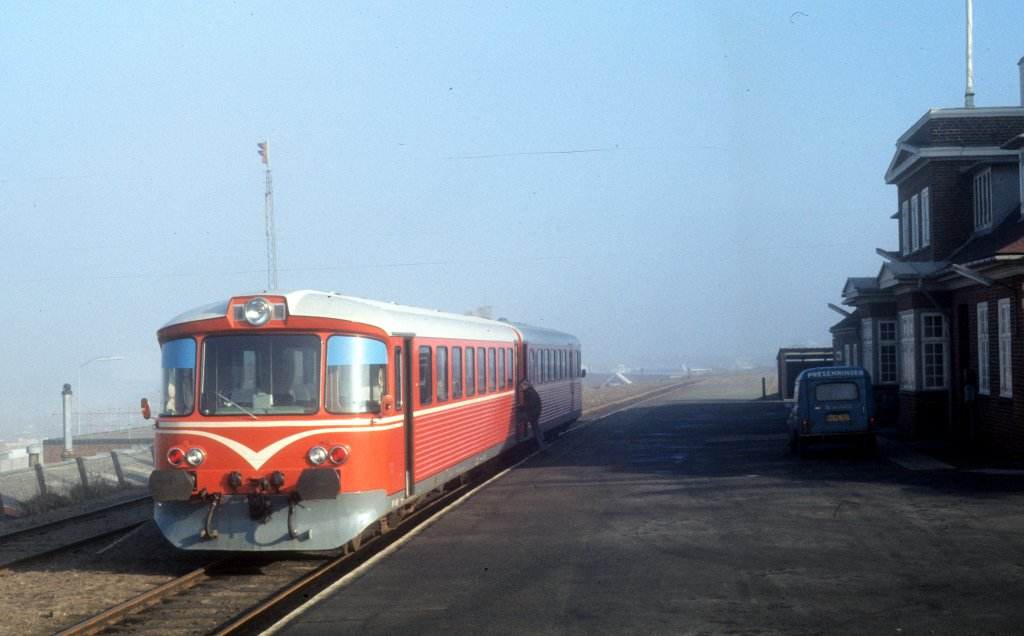
Railcar from Hjørring Privatbaner at Hirtshals station in 1975

The station opened in 1925 to serve as terminus of the new railway line from Hjørring to Hirtshals which was built during the construction of the Port of Hirtshals in the period from 1919 to 1931.

However, the original station was located some distance from the city center, and already in 1928 the station was moved east to its current location closer to the port.

== Architecture ==
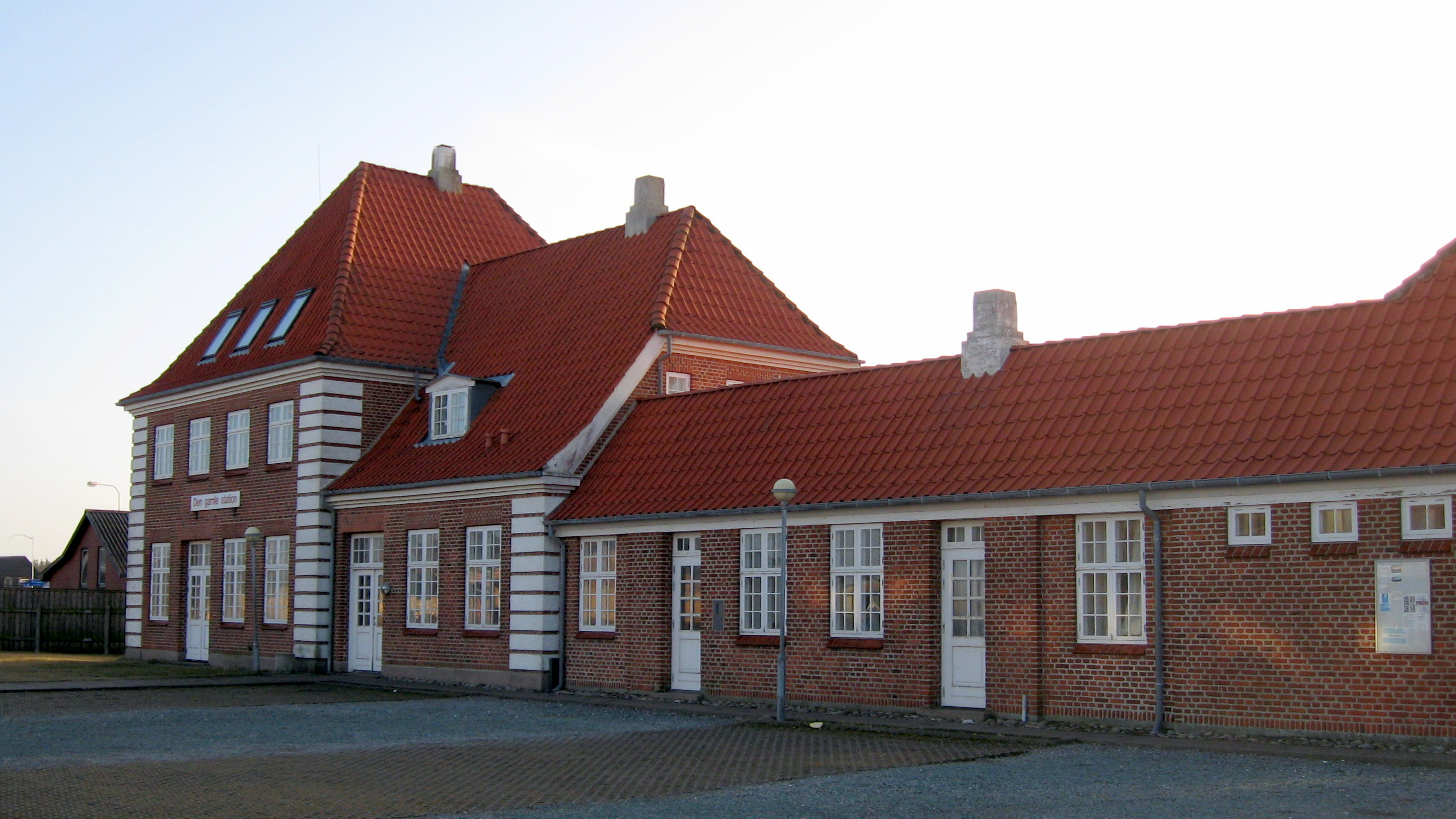
The original station building in 2011

The original station building from 1925 was built by the Danish architect Sylvius Knutzen. It was designed in the grand style characteristic of the railway lines of the railway company Hjørring Privatbaner. It still exists and now houses different offices and meeting facilities.

After a number of years with a temporary solution, the port's former administration building, which had been built in 1919, was rebuilt into a station building and post office, and the current station building was thus taken into use in 1939.

== Operations ==
=== Train services ===
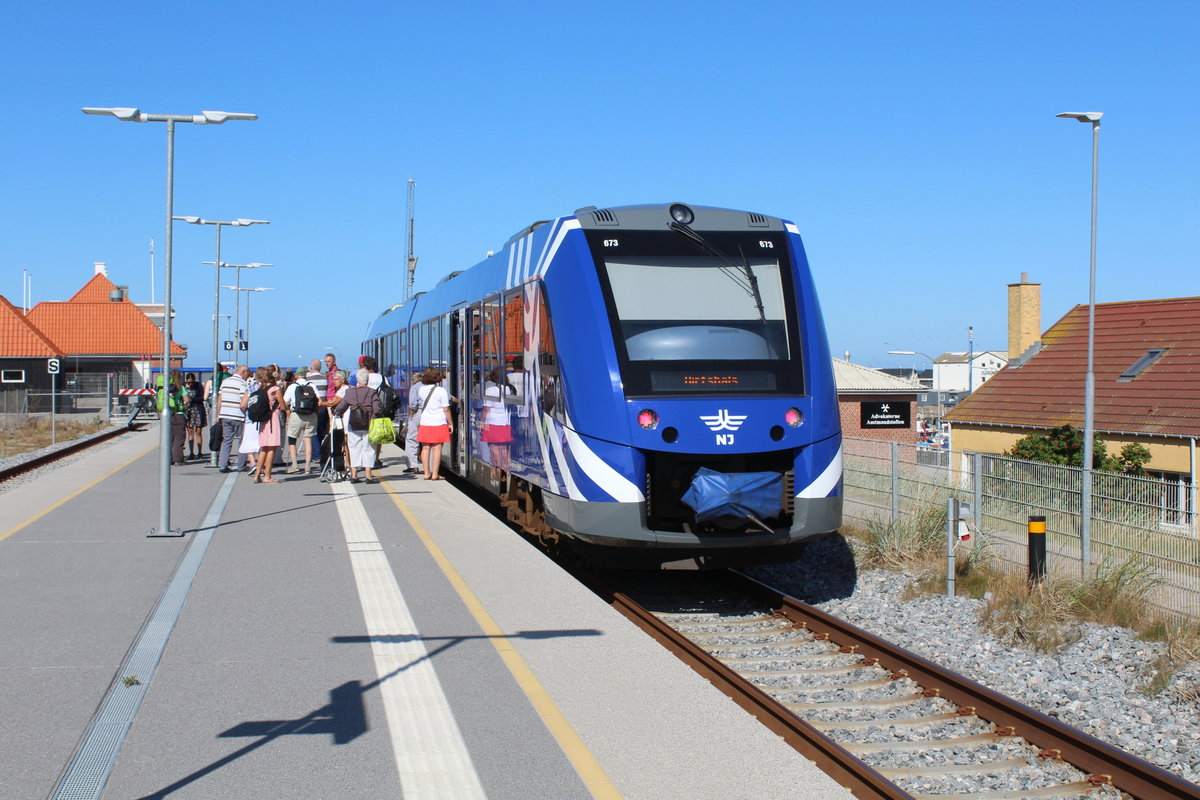
A DMU from Nordjyske Jernbaner arriving to Hirtshals from Hjørring in 2018.

The train services are currently operated by Nordjyske Jernbaner which run frequent local train services from Hirtshals to Hjørring with onward connections from Hjørring to the rest of Denmark.

An international passenger service, Nordpilen, between Hirtshals and Hamburg, connecting with the ferries to and from Norway, ceased many years ago.

== See also ==
- List of railway stations in Denmark
- Rail transport in Denmark
- History of rail transport in Denmark
- Transport in Denmark

== Bibliography ==
- Bruun-Petersen, Jens; Poulsen, John (2002). Internationale tog via Jylland [International trains via Jutland] (in Danish). Bane bøger. ISBN 87-88632-91-1.
- Jensen, Niels (1972). Danske Jernbaner 1847–1972 [Danish railways 1847–1972] (in Danish). Copenhagen: J.Fr. Clausens Forlag. ISBN 87-11-01765-1.
- Jensen, Niels (1976). Nordjyske jernbaner [Railways of North Jutland] (in Danish). Copenhagen: J.Fr. Clausens Forlag. ISBN 87-11-03756-3.
- Gregersen, A. (1965). Hirtshalsbanen. 1925 - 19. december - 1965 [The Hirtshhals Line, 1925 – 19 December – 1965] (PDF) (in Danish). Jernbanehistorisk Selskab.
- Thomassen, P. (1975). Hirtshalsbanen gennem 50 år. 1925 - 19. december - 1975 [The Hirtshals Line through 50 years. 1925 – 19 December – 1975] (in Danish). Bestyrelsen for Hirtshalsbanen.
