= Nordjyske Jernbaner =

- Company type: Aktieselskab
- Industry: Transportation
- Predecessor: Hjørring Privatbaner; Skagensbanen
- Founded: 2001
- Headquarters: Hjørring, Denmark
- Area served: Region Nordjylland, Denmark
- Products: Public Transport
- Services: Passenger transportation
- Revenue: 55m DKK
- Operating income: 2.3m DKK
- Net income: 127,797 DKK
- Total assets: 122m DKK
- Total equity: 6.5m DKK
- Owner: Nordjyllands Trafikselskab
- Number of employees: 45
- Parent: NJ Holding Nordjylland A/S
- Website: www.nj.dk

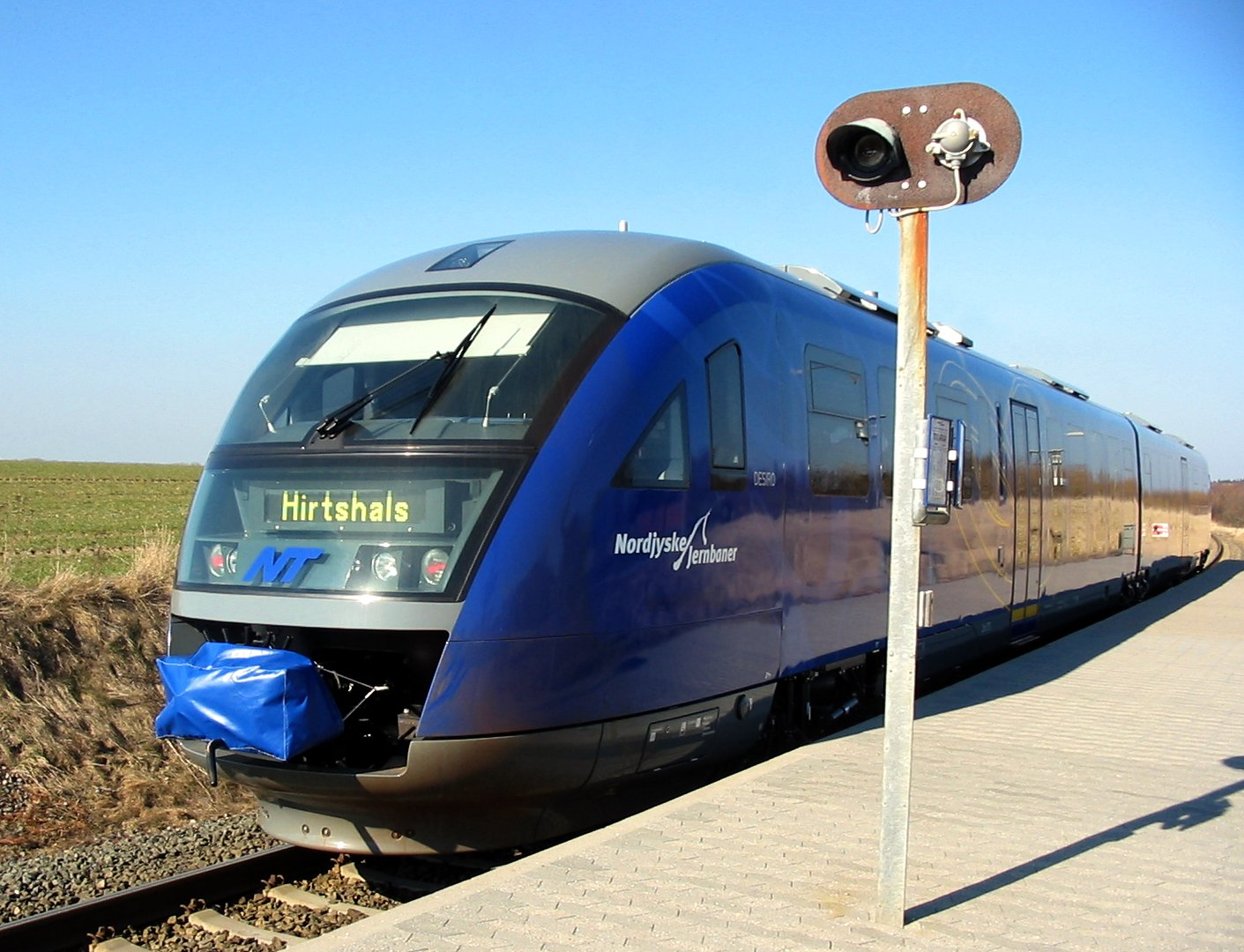
A NJ Siemens Desiro DMU at the Herregårdsparken halt between Hjørring and Hirtshals.

Nordjyske Jernbaner (abbreviated NJ) is a Danish railway company operating in Region Nordjylland. The company was formed in 2001 as a merger of Hjørring Privatbaner (HP) and Skagensbanen (SB) and Hirtshalsbanen (HB). Headquartered in Hjørring, the company is responsible for running the former HP, HB and SB lines, i.e., Hjørring–Hirtshals and Frederikshavn–Skagen, respectively. From 2017 and onwards, they started running trains from Skørping to Lindholm on the Aalborg Nærbane line.

== See also ==
- Rail transport in Denmark
