= 2025 Hjørring municipal election =

- 18 November 2025

All 31 seats to the Hjørring municipal council 16 seats needed for a majority
- Turnout: 35,520 (69.5%) ▼0.1%
	First party	Second party	Third party
	A	V	C
Party	Social Democrats	Venstre	Conservatives
Last election	10 seats, 31.7%	9 seats, 26.3%	7 seats, 20.5%
Seats won	9	7	7
Seat change	▼1	▼2	0
Popular vote	9,787	8,035	6,507
Percentage	28.0%	23.0%	18.6%
Swing	▼3.7%	▼3.3%	▼1.9%
	Fourth party	Fifth party	Sixth party
	Æ	F	O
Party	Denmark Democrats	Green Left	Danish People's Party
Last election	Did not stand	1 seat, 3.9%	1 seat, 4.0%
Seats won	2	2	1
Seat change	▲2	▲1	0
Popular vote	2,328	2,296	1,544
Percentage	6.7%	6.6%	4.4%
Swing	New	▲2.7%	▲0.4%
	Seventh party	Eighth party	Ninth party
	B	L	Ø
Party	Social Liberals	Vendelbo-Listen	Red-Green Alliance
Last election	1 seat, 3.0%	Did not stand	1 seat, 2.5%
Seats won	1	1	1
Seat change	0	▲1	0
Popular vote	1,273	1,057	932
Percentage	3.6%	3.0%	2.7%
Swing	▲0.6%	New	▲0.1%
Mayor before election
Søren Smalbro
Venstre
Mayor after election
Søren Smalbro
Venstre

The 2025 Hjørring Municipal election was held on November 18, 2025, to elect the 31 members to sit in the regional council for the Hjørring Municipal council, in the period of 2026 to 2029. The three largest parties, Social Democrats, Venstre and Conservatives all saw drop in vote share, and lost seats. However Søren Smalbro from Venstre would still manage, to win the mayoral position.

== Background ==
On the 24 November 2021, a constitution between the Social Liberals, Conservatives and Venstre was agreed upon, following the 2021 Hjørring municipal election which saw Søren Smalbro from Venstre become mayor. In may 2024, Smalbro, was re-elected as the mayoral candidate from Venstre.

== Electoral system ==
For elections to Danish municipalities, a number varying from 9 to 31 are chosen to be elected to the municipal council. The seats are then allocated using the D'Hondt method and a closed list proportional representation. Hjørring Municipality had 31 seats in 2025

Unlike in Danish General Elections, in elections to municipal councils, electoral alliances are allowed.

== Electoral alliances ==
=== Electoral Alliance 1 ===
Party		Political alignment
B	Social Liberals	Centre to Centre-left
V	Venstre	Centre-right

=== Electoral Alliance 2 ===
Party		Political alignment
C	Conservatives	Centre-right
I	Liberal Alliance	Centre-right to Right-wing
Æ	Denmark Democrats	Right-wing to Far-right

=== Electoral Alliance 3 ===
Party		Political alignment
F	Green Left	Centre-left to Left-wing
Ø	Red-Green Alliance	Left-wing to Far-Left

== Results by polling station ==
Division	A	B	C	E	F	I	J	L	M	O	V	Æ	Ø
Division	%	%	%	%	%	%	%	%	%	%	%	%	%
Horne, Stendyssehallen	21.4	5.2	16.4	0.1	4.6	3.7	0.0	4.7	1.3	6.8	24.5	10.1	1.1
Hirtshals	24.1	8.7	18.1	0.0	4.7	2.8	0.1	3.5	0.6	6.2	21.8	7.8	1.5
Hjørring - Centrum	32.0	4.2	20.3	0.3	9.7	2.2	0.1	2.3	1.0	3.4	16.3	3.3	4.8
Tornby	16.9	4.3	9.8	0.0	6.2	2.0	0.1	2.7	0.9	3.1	46.3	4.9	2.7
Bindslev	16.1	1.3	7.8	0.3	2.9	1.7	0.1	4.7	0.2	4.5	46.2	11.1	3.0
Tversted	20.9	4.3	10.8	0.1	7.8	3.1	0.3	6.2	1.4	5.6	28.5	8.5	2.5
Taars	22.1	1.2	26.9	0.5	5.3	1.9	0.1	3.1	0.7	4.8	22.4	9.5	1.6
Vrejlev-Hæstrup	22.7	2.4	16.1	0.1	4.6	3.2	0.2	4.6	0.6	5.9	26.1	12.5	0.9
Bjergby-Mygdal	17.3	3.5	9.8	0.2	5.8	1.7	0.0	1.8	0.8	3.8	45.9	7.7	1.9
Skallerup	27.5	3.9	11.9	0.2	10.4	3.7	0.3	2.2	1.3	4.7	25.1	4.6	4.1
Hjørring - Nord	32.2	4.1	23.7	0.3	6.3	1.7	0.2	2.5	0.8	3.3	18.4	4.3	2.2
Hjørring - Syd	31.3	3.6	21.1	0.2	6.2	2.0	0.2	2.2	0.5	3.5	22.0	4.6	2.6
Hjørring - Vest	32.2	4.5	22.7	0.0	7.9	1.5	0.1	2.6	0.9	3.5	17.1	3.7	3.1
Vrå	35.2	2.7	12.3	0.0	7.3	1.8	0.1	3.0	1.3	5.6	18.7	7.5	4.6
Hundelev	21.9	1.3	21.3	0.5	6.4	4.8	0.0	3.0	2.2	4.8	22.9	8.0	2.9
Løkken	35.9	1.4	18.7	0.1	7.7	1.6	0.0	1.6	0.8	3.8	19.4	7.3	1.6
Sindal	31.8	2.2	18.0	0.1	5.0	2.1	0.1	3.7	0.5	4.4	22.0	8.5	1.6
Astrup	21.4	2.2	13.3	0.0	5.6	4.7	0.3	4.2	0.8	4.8	32.9	7.5	2.3
Tolne	17.9	2.5	11.6	0.6	6.3	3.8	0.2	8.9	0.3	8.2	24.2	11.7	3.6
Ugilt	22.8	0.7	12.2	0.2	3.9	3.9	0.5	3.2	1.2	6.7	30.7	12.5	1.4
Lendum	17.3	1.2	27.4	0.3	4.2	2.2	0.1	2.6	1.6	5.4	20.5	14.9	2.2

== Results ==
Party		Votes	%	+/-	Seats	+/-
Hjørring Municipality
A	Social Democrats	9,787	27.99	-3.71	9	-1
V	Venstre	8,035	22.98	-3.33	7	-2
C	Conservatives	6,507	18.61	-1.88	7	0
Æ	Denmark Democrats	2,328	6.66	New	2	New
F	Green Left	2,296	6.57	+2.71	2	+1
O	Danish People's Party	1,544	4.42	+0.44	1	0
B	Social Liberals	1,273	3.64	+0.61	1	0
L	Vendelbo-Listen	1,057	3.02	New	1	New
Ø	Red-Green Alliance	932	2.67	+0.15	1	0
I	Liberal Alliance	792	2.27	New	0	New
M	Moderates	304	0.87	New	0	New
E	Stabilt Demokrati	60	0.17	New	0	New
J	Hjørring for alle	49	0.14	-0.17	0	0
Total		34,964	100	N/A	31	N/A
Invalid votes		101	0.20	-0.04		
Blank votes		455	0.89	+0.15		
Turnout		35,520	69.53	-0.11		
Source: valg.dk

== Opinion polls ==
Polling firm	Fieldwork date	Sample size	A	V	C	O	F	B	Ø	J	E	I	L	M	Æ	Others	Lead
Epinion	4 Sep - 13 Oct 2025	496	34.9	19.6	10.9	5.0	6.4	1.5	2.5	–	–	7.0	–	0.3	10.6	1.4	15.3
2024 european parliament election	9 Jun 2024		19.4	19.6	7.6	6.7	11.5	3.7	3.7	–	–	5.4	–	4.9	16.3	–	0.2
2022 general election	1 Nov 2022		35.2	13.6	5.3	2.0	4.8	1.5	2.5	–	–	5.8	–	6.3	16.7	–	18.5
2021 regional election	16 Nov 2021		32.7	21.2	24.2	4.5	3.6	3.5	3.2	–	–	0.5	–	–	–	–	8.5
2021 municipal election	16 Nov 2021		31.7 (10)	26.3 (9)	20.5 (7)	4.0 (1)	3.9 (1)	3.0 (1)	2.5 (1)	0.3 (0)	–	–	–	–	–	–	5.4
