= 2021 Hjørring municipal election =

← 2017	16 November 2021	2025 →

All 31 seats to the Hjørring Municipal Council 16 seats needed for a majority
- Turnout: 33,065 (68.1%) ▼3.4pp
	First party	Second party	Third party
	A	V	C
Party	Social Democrats	Venstre	Conservatives
Last election	15 seats, 44.2%	7 seats, 20.5%	3 seats, 9.4%
Seats won	10	9	7
Seat change	▼5	▲2	▲4
Popular vote	11,207	9,302	7,243
Percentage	31.7%	26.3%	20.5%
Swing	▼12.5%	▲5.8%	▲11.1%
	Fourth party	Fifth party	Sixth party
	O	F	D
Party	Danish People's Party	Green Left	New Right
Last election	2 seats, 6.8%	1 seat, 3.6%	0 seats, 1.5%
Seats won	1	1	1
Seat change	▼1	0	▲1
Popular vote	1,405	1,362	1,337
Percentage	4.0%	3.8%	3.8%
Swing	▼2.8%	▲0.2%	▲2.3%
	Seventh party	Eighth party	Ninth party
	B	Ø	T
Party	Social Liberals	Red–Green Alliance	Lokalisten
Last election	0 seats, 1.2%	1 seat, 2.6%	2 seats, 6.0%
Seats won	1	1	0
Seat change	▲1	0	▼2
Popular vote	1,072	891	1,019
Percentage	3.0%	2.5%	2.9
Swing	▲1.8%	▼0.1%	▼3.1%
Mayor before election
Arne Boelt
Social Democrats
Mayor after election
Søren Smalbro
Venstre

Since its creation in the 2007 municipal reform, Hjørring had only had mayors from the Social Democrats. However the Social Democrats ended up losing 5 seats. This might have been a consequence of the 2020 Danish mink cull, and Hjørring being a municipality with a high number of mink farming. Only the Social Liberals from the traditional red bloc in Denmark, gained a seat, and the bloc had only won 13 of the 16 seats needed for a majority. Centre-right Venstre and Conservatives, both gained 2 and 4 seats respectively, and had a majority of seats together. On 24 November 2021, a constitution between the Social Liberals, Conservatives and Venstre was agreed upon, which saw Søren Smalbro from Venstre become mayor, with Per Møller from Conservatives, becoming deputy mayor.

== Electoral system ==
For elections to Danish municipalities, a number varying from 9 to 31 are chosen to be elected to the municipal council. The seats are then allocated using the D'Hondt method and a closed list proportional representation. Hjørring Municipality had 31 seats in 2021

Unlike in Danish General Elections, in elections to municipal councils, electoral alliances are allowed.

== Electoral alliances ==
=== Electoral Alliance 1 ===
Party		Political alignment
F	Green Left	Centre-left to Left-wing
Ø	Red–Green Alliance	Left-wing to Far-Left

=== Electoral Alliance 2 ===
Party		Political alignment
K	Christian Democrats	Centre to Centre-right
V	Venstre	Centre-right

=== Electoral Alliance 3 ===
Party		Political alignment
C	Conservatives	Centre-right
D	New Right	Right-wing to Far-right
O	Danish People's Party	Right-wing to Far-right

== Results by polling station ==
Polling Station	A	B	C	D	F	K	O	V	Ø	Å	Others
Polling Station	%	%	%	%	%	%	%	%	%	%	%
Horne	17.9	3.3	23.0	5.6	2.2	1.0	5.4	28.4	1.5	0.2	11.4
Hirtshals	19.1	4.7	20.6	5.2	2.1	0.9	7.5	24.5	1.3	0.4	13.6
Hjørring - Centrum	37.6	4.4	22.0	2.7	6.0	0.6	3.4	16.4	4.4	0.4	1.9
Hjørring - Nord	39.3	3.0	25.6	2.4	4.3	0.6	2.9	19.2	1.5	0.3	0.9
Hjørring - Syd	35.8	2.8	21.8	2.6	4.3	0.5	2.6	25.9	2.0	0.2	1.6
Hjørring - Vest	37.4	3.6	22.9	2.4	4.4	1.1	3.2	20.1	3.0	0.2	1.7
Tornby	14.7	4.5	20.6	3.1	4.0	0.6	4.9	36.4	1.5	0.5	9.1
Bindslev	19.8	1.8	11.1	5.1	2.0	0.9	5.6	48.7	2.6	0.2	2.2
Tversted	21.4	3.2	18.6	2.8	3.0	0.8	4.4	37.1	3.2	0.0	5.7
Taars	28.2	1.6	23.1	4.0	3.4	2.5	4.1	30.1	1.7	0.1	1.2
Vrejlev-Hæstrup	25.2	1.8	22.6	5.3	3.5	1.1	4.8	32.2	1.5	0.1	1.7
Bjergby-Mygdal	21.2	3.7	13.0	3.9	4.0	0.3	3.4	46.4	1.8	0.1	2.2
Skallerup	31.4	3.0	15.0	2.5	5.2	0.8	3.3	29.4	6.9	0.5	2.1
Vrå	29.9	2.4	11.4	4.6	3.0	0.7	2.4	15.9	3.0	0.1	1.3
Hundelev	27.6	2.4	18.3	5.9	4.5	0.3	2.9	30.3	2.2	0.2	5.3
Løkken	29.5	1.1	21.0	2.8	3.1	0.7	2.9	34.5	3.2	0.2	1.0
Sindal	44.8	1.9	16.8	4.1	2.4	1.4	4.7	21.0	1.7	0.2	0.9
Astrup	26.6	3.1	17.8	5.6	3.9	0.6	3.0	35.2	1.6	0.2	2.5
Tolne	24.5	1.9	18.1	8.0	5.4	1.3	6.6	29.9	3.1	0.3	1.0
Ugilt	35.2	1.4	15.3	4.9	2.2	0.8	5.2	31.3	1.5	0.2	2.0
Lendum	26.6	1.4	21.6	6.1	2.5	2.1	4.6	32.4	1.6	0.0	1.1

== Results ==
Party		Votes	%	+/-	Seats	+/-
Hjørring Municipality
A	Social Democrats	11,207	31.70	-12.55	10	-5
V	Venstre	9,302	26.31	+5.81	9	+2
C	Conservatives	7,243	20.49	+11.06	7	+4
O	Danish People's Party	1,405	3.97	-2.82	1	-1
F	Green Left	1,362	3.85	+0.25	1	0
D	New Right	1,337	3.78	+2.31	1	+1
B	Social Liberals	1,072	3.03	+1.80	1	+1
T	Lokallisten	1,019	2.88	-3.08	0	-2
Ø	Red-Green Alliance	891	2.52	-0.07	1	0
K	Christian Democrats	320	0.91	+0.17	0	0
J	Hjørring for alle	111	0.31	New	0	New
Å	The Alternative	85	0.24	-0.76	0	0
Total		35,354	100	N/A	31	N/A
Invalid votes		123	0.24	-0.06		
Blank votes		377	0.73	+0.03		
Turnout		35,854	69.63	-1.77		
Source: valg.dk
