= Løkken =

Løkken may refer to the following locations:

- Løkken-Vrå, a former municipality in Denmark, Now part of Hjørring.
- Løkken, Denmark, a small sea side town.
- Løkken Verk, a village in Norway.
