= Vrå railway station =

Railway station in North Jutland, Denmark

Vrå
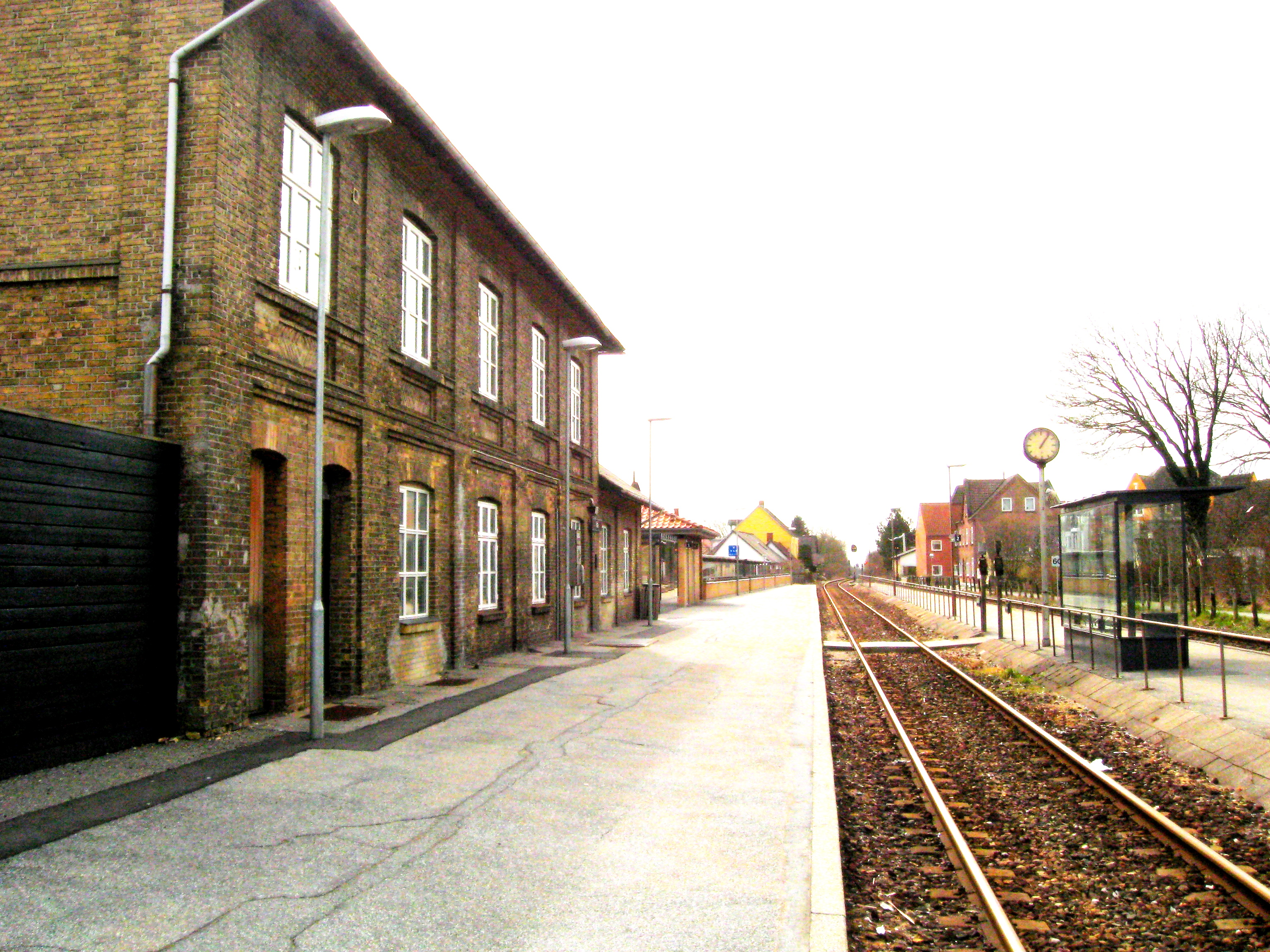
- Vrå station in 2009

General information
- Location: Jernbanegade 7; 9760 Vrå; Hjørring Municipality; Denmark
- Coordinates: 57°21′16″N 9°56′33″E
- Elevation: 24.7 metres (81 ft)
- Owner: DSB (station infrastructure); Banedanmark (rail infrastructure)
- Line: Vendsyssel Line
- Platforms: 2 side platforms
- Tracks: 2
- Train operators: Nordjyske Jernbaner

Construction
- Architect: N.P.C. Holsøe

History
- Opened: 1871

Services
Preceding station	Nordjyske Jernbaner	Following station
Brønderslev towards Hobro	Hobro – Skagen Regional train	Hjørring towards Skagen
Brønderslev towards Skørping	Skørping – Hirtshals Regional train Peak hours	Hjørring towards Hirtshals
Location

Vrå railway station is a railway station serving the railway town of Vrå in Vendsyssel, Denmark. The station is located in the central part of the town by its main artery Jernbanegade.

The station is located on the Vendsyssel Line from Aalborg to Frederikshavn, between Hjørring and Brønderslev. It opened in 1871. The train services are currently operated by the railway company Nordjyske Jernbaner which runs frequent regional train services to Aalborg and Frederikshavn.

== History ==
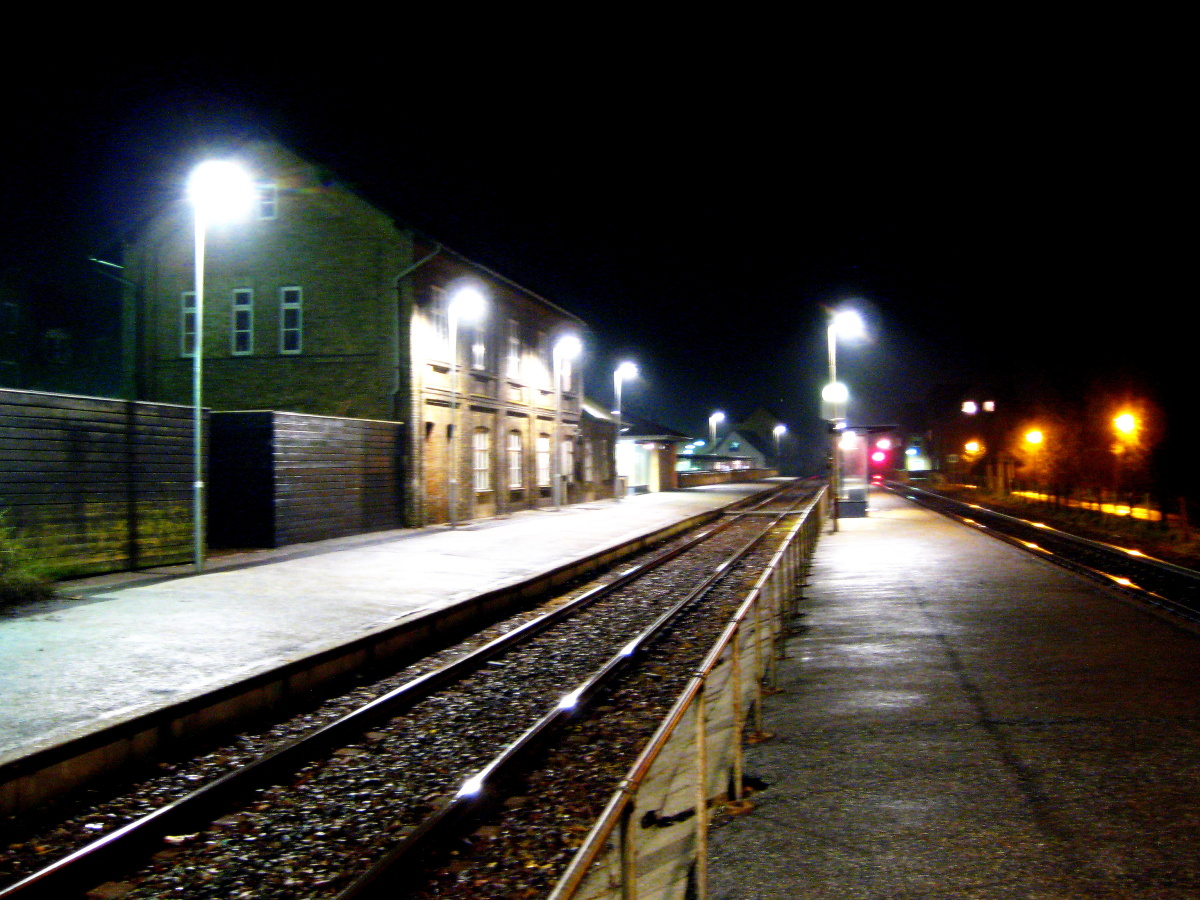
Vrå station by night in 2009

The station opened in 1871 as the branch from Nørresundby to Frederikshavn of the new Vendsyssel Line opened on 16 August 1871. On 7 January 1879, at the opening of the Limfjord Railway Bridge, the Vendsyssel line was connected with Aalborg station, the Randers-Aalborg railway line and the rest of the Danish rail network.

Today, the station is closed but continues as a halt.

In 2017, the regional rail services on the Vendsyssel Line were transferred from the national railway company DSB to the regional railway company Nordjyske Jernbaner.

== Architecture ==
The station building was built to designs by the Danish architect Niels Peder Christian Holsøe (1826–1895), known for the numerous railway stations he designed across Denmark in his capacity of head architect of the Danish State Railways.

== Operations ==
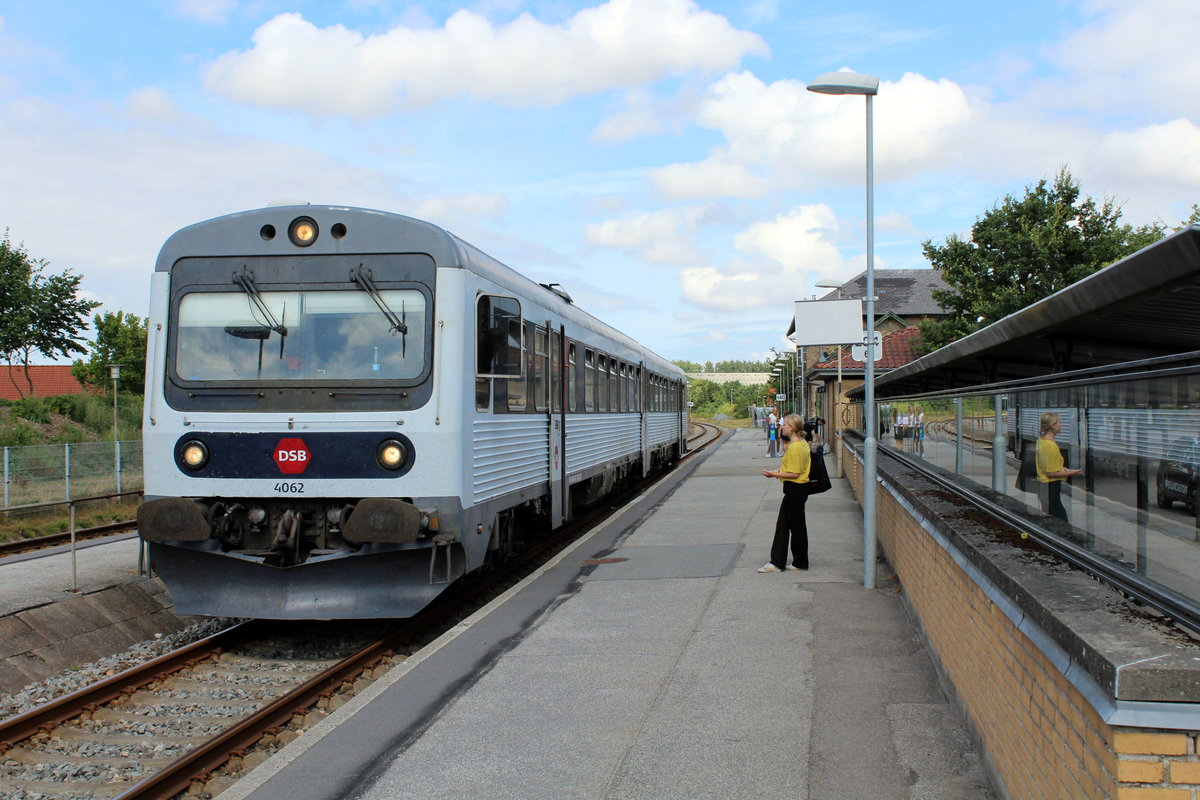
DSB train calling at Vrå in 2018

Since 2017, train services at the station are operated by the regional railway company Nordjyske Jernbaner (NJ). NJ runs frequent regional train services from the station to Hobro, Aalborg, Hjørring, Hirtshals, Frederikshavn and Skagen which have a journey time to central Aalborg of around 20 minutes and to Hjørring of about 15 minutes.

The direct InterCity service from the station to Copenhagen operated by the national railway company DSB ceased in 2019.

== See also ==
- List of railway stations in Denmark
- Rail transport in Denmark
- History of rail transport in Denmark
- Transport in Denmark
