= Dahlerup =

Dahlerup is a Danish surname.

Notable people with this surname include:

- Drude Dahlerup (born 1945), Danish-Swedish political scientist
- Hans Birch Dahlerup, (1790–1872, commander-in-chief of the Austro-Hungarian Navy
- Karen Dahlerup (1920–2018), Danish politician and women's rights activist
- Ulla Dahlerup (born 1942), Danish journalist
- Vilhelm Dahlerup (1836–1907), Danish architect

== Other ==
- Dahlerup Warehouse, Copenhagen, Denmark

== See also ==
- Camilla Dallerup
