= Sindal Municipality =

Coordinates: 57.4667°N 10.2167°E

Sindal Municipality Sindal Kommune
- Former Municipality
- Coat of arms
- Interactive map of Sindal Municipality
- Country: Denmark
- County: North Jutland County
- Formed: 1966
- Dissolved: 2007

Area
  - Total: 242 km^{2} (93 sq mi)

Population (2005)
  - Total: 9,425

Sindal Municipality was a municipality (Danish: kommune) in Denmark. It was located on the island of Vendsyssel-Thy at the top of the Jutland peninsula in northern Denmark and belonged to North Jutland County. It was abolished effective 1 January 2007. The municipal seat was located in the town of Sindal.

== Geography ==
The former Sindal municipality covered an area of 242 km², and had a total population of 9,425 (2005).

== Merger ==
On January 1, 2007 Sindal municipality ceased to exist due to Kommunalreformen ("The Municipality Reform" of 2007). It was merged with existing Hirtshals, Hjørring, and Løkken-Vrå municipalities to form an expanded Hjørring Municipality. This created a municipality with an area of 929,58 km² and a total population of ca. 67,816.
