= Karen Dahlerup =

Danish politician (1920–2018)

Karen Marie Dahlerup Andersen (1920–2018) was a Danish women's rights activist and a politician representing the Social Democrats. Keen to support equal treatment of men and women, she served as editor of the party's magazine Frie Kvinder before entering the Folketing, first as a successor to members who had resigned, then as a member in her own right (1977–1981). She was also a member of the European Parliament (1977–1979). In the late 1980s, Dahlerup served on the municipal council of Løkken-Vrå, where she became deputy mayor.

== Early life, education and family ==
Born on 17 January 1920 in Brønderslev in the north of Jutland, Karen Maria Christensen was the daughter of the carpenter Chresten Christensen (1893–1961) and his wife Amalie (1894–1972). She was one of the family's three daughters. On graduating from middle school, she trained as a pharmacy technician. In November 1942, she married the foreman Henry Dahlerup Andersen with whom she had two children, Lene (1943) and Hanne (1944).

== Career ==
From 1937 to 1942, she worked as a pharmacy technician. Following the birth of her first child in 1943, she had various evening jobs in factories and as a telephonist. Dahlerup was employed as an office manager for the Glostrup's department for funerals and cemeteries (1959–63), as women's secretary for the Social Democrats (1962–70) and as a consultant for the Labour Directorate at the Ministry of Employment. From 1963, she also participated in the Social Democrats' executive committee and its higher management. She was editor of the party's journal for women Frie Kvinder (1966–60) and chair of its Family Committee (1967–74).

After serving as successor to party members who had resigned, she was elected to the Folketing in her own right (1977–81) and served as a member of the party's finance committee. In addition, from 1976 she was a member of the United Nations Women's Commission and was a member of the European Parliament (1977–79).

In 1984, Dahlerup moved to Løkken. She served on the municipal council of Løkken-Vrå and became deputy mayor (1986–89).

Karen Dahlerup Andersen died on 10 June 2018.
