= Brønderslev railway station =

Railway station in North Jutland, Denmark

Brønderslev
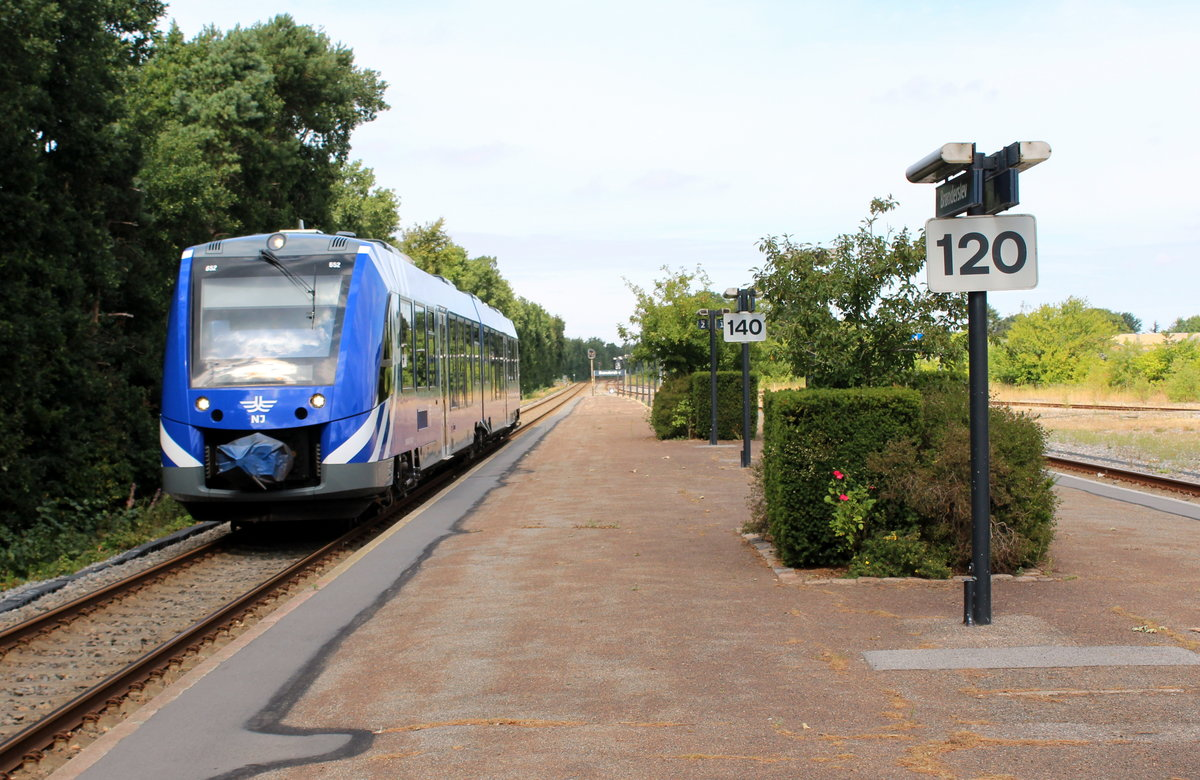
- Brønderslev station in 2018

General information
- Location: Banegårdspladsen 10–12; 9700 Brønderslev; Brønderslev Municipality; Denmark
- Coordinates: 57°16′13.14″N 9°56′33.76″E
- Elevation: 14.3 metres (47 ft)
- Owner: DSB (station infrastructure); Banedanmark (rail infrastructure)
- Line: Vendsyssel Line
- Platforms: 1 island platform
- Tracks: 2
- Train operators: Nordjyske Jernbaner

Construction
- Architect: Niels Peder Christian Holsøe (1871); Ole Ejnar Bonding (1966)

Other information
- Station code: Bl

History
- Opened: 1871; 155 years ago
- Rebuilt: 1966; 60 years ago

Services
Preceding station	Nordjyske Jernbaner	Following station
Lindholm towards Hobro	Hobro – Skagen Regional train	Vrå towards Skagen
Lindholm towards Skørping	Skørping – Hirtshals Regional train Peak hours	Vrå towards Hirtshals
Location

Brønderslev railway station (Danish: Brønderslev Station or Brønderslev Banegård) is a railway station serving the town of Brønderslev in Vendsyssel, Denmark. It is situated in the central part of the town, immediately adjacent to Brønderslev's bus station.

The station is located on the Vendsyssel Line from Aalborg to Frederikshavn. It opened in 1871 and was moved to its current location in 1966. The train services are operated by the railway company Nordjyske Jernbaner, which runs frequent regional train services to Aalborg and Frederikshavn. Its second and current station building in modernist style was built in 1966 to designs by the Danish architect Ole Ejnar Bonding.

== History ==
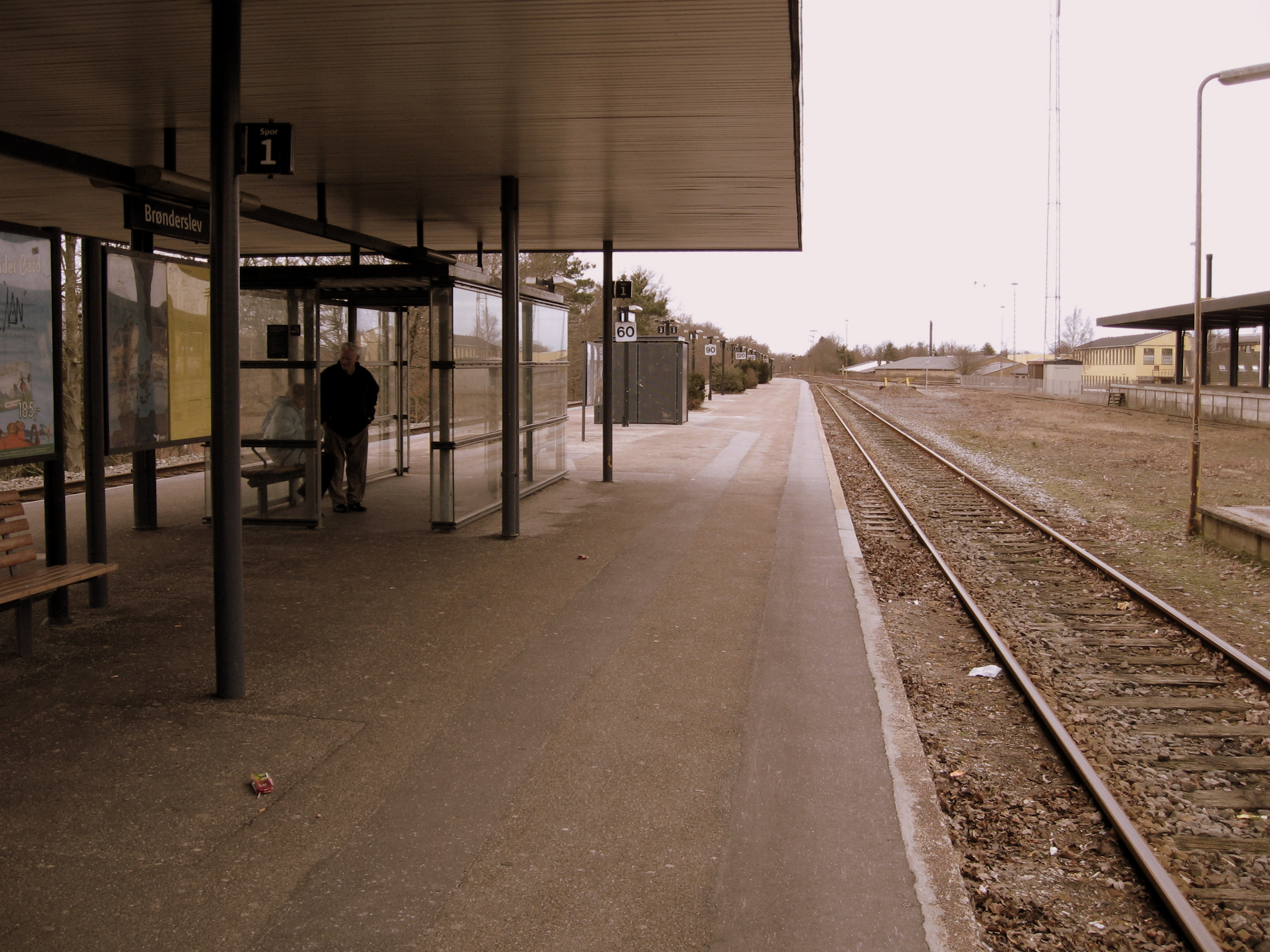
The passenger platform at Brønderslev station in 2009.

The station opened in 1871 as the section from Nørresundby to Frederikshavn of the new Vendsyssel Line opened on 16 August 1871. On 7 January 1879, at the opening of the Limfjord Railway Bridge, the Vendsyssel line was connected with Aalborg station, the Randers-Aalborg railway line and the rest of the Danish rail network.

The station opened in more or less open fields near the small farming village of Vester Brønderslev, located approximately 1.5 km (0.93 mi) west of the highway between Aalborg and Hjørring. The improved infrastructure resulted in growth in trade and industry, and after the opening of the railway line, a railway town quickly developed around the station. During the last decades of the 19th century, the town grew at an almost explosive rate, so that in 1921 it achieved the status of market town (Danish: købstad) as the penultimate Danish town.

The development of the town and the growth in traffic led to the need for better infrastructure to support the growing city and improve the railway infrastructure. As early as 1889, space was freed up when the postal service voluntarily moved out and built a new post office in extension of the station building. Later it was decided to move the railway tracks west and elevate them to increase capacity at the station and eliminate three level crossings in the town. Thus, in 1966, the station was moved to its current location as part of the realignment of the railway tracks through the town, and the old station was closed and torn down.

In 2017, operation of the regional rail services on the Vendsyssel Line to Aalborg and Frederikshavn were transferred from the national railway company DSB to the regional railway company Nordjyske Jernbaner (NJ).

In 2024, the station was renovated with the passenger platform being raised from 26 cm (10 in) to 55 cm (22 in) and shortened from 289 m (948 ft) to 130 m (430 ft). Also the accessibility of the station was improved.

== Architecture ==
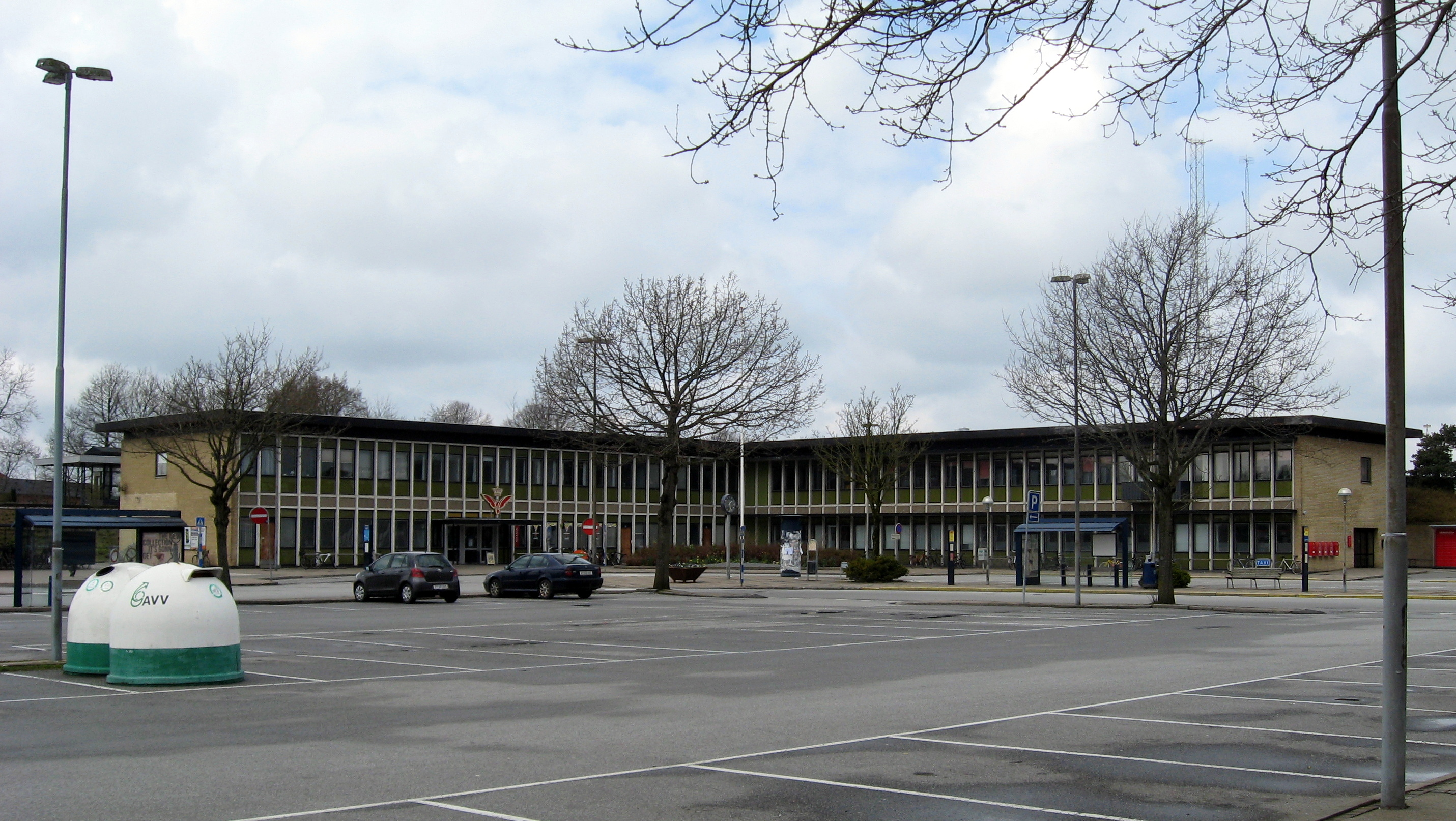
Street facade of the station building

Brønderslev stations first station building from 1871 was designed by the Danish architect Niels Peder Christian Holsøe (1826–1895), known for the numerous railway stations he designed across Denmark in his capacity of head architect of the Danish State Railways. The station building was torn down in 1966.

The second and current station building in modernist style was built in 1966 to designs by the Danish architect Ole Ejnar Bonding in his capacity of head architect of the Danish State Railways from 1958 to 1979. It is in the same uncompromising modernist architectural style as Bonding's other station buildings in Kalundborg, Skive, Nykøbing Falster, Vojens, Sønderborg, Rødekro, Holbæk, Svanemøllen and Herning.

== Operations ==
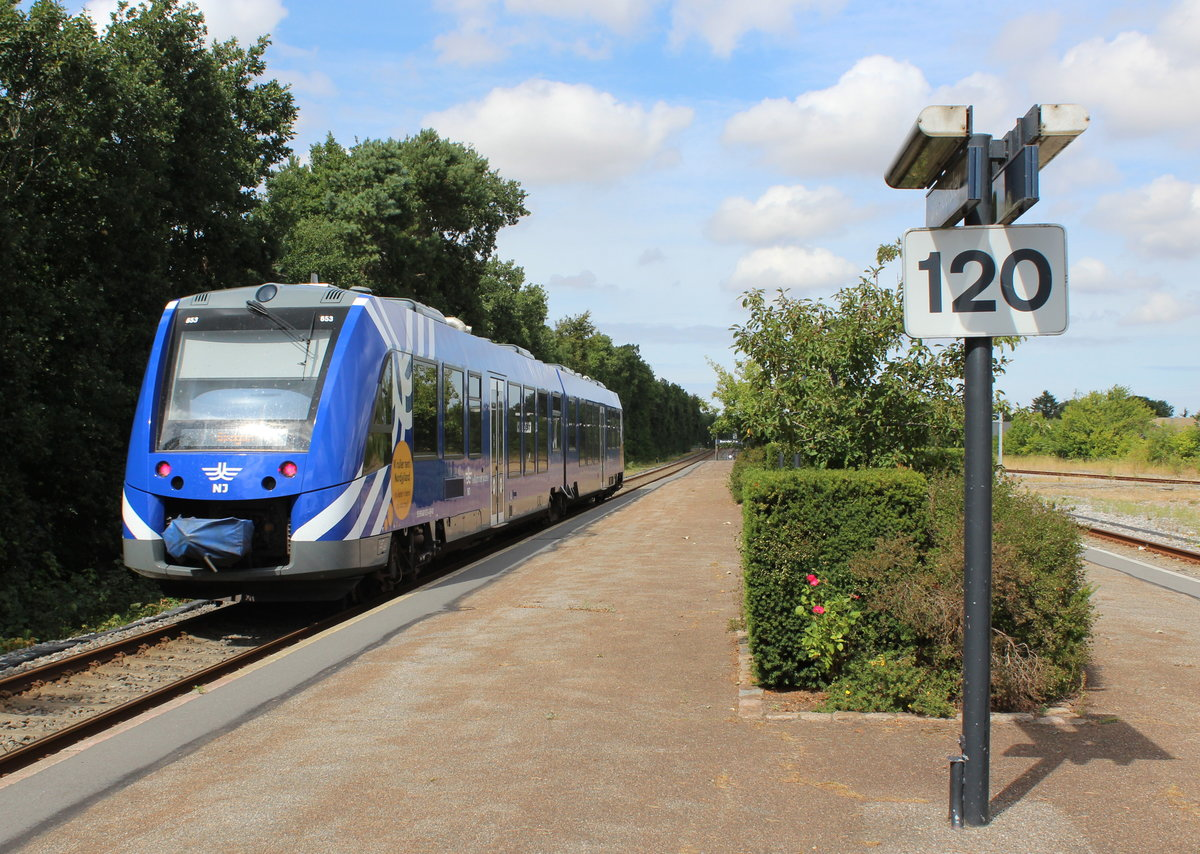
A DMU from Nordjyske Jernbaner calling at Brønderslev in 2018.

Since 2017, train services at the station are operated by the regional railway company Nordjyske Jernbaner (NJ). NJ runs frequent regional train services from the station to Aalborg, Hjørring, Hirtshals, Frederikshavn and Skagen which have a journey time to central Aalborg of around 20 minutes and to Hjørring of about 15 minutes.

The direct InterCity service from the station to Copenhagen operated by the national railway company DSB ceased in 2019.

== See also ==
- List of railway stations in Denmark
- Rail transport in Denmark
- History of rail transport in Denmark
- Transport in Denmark
