= Astrup, Hjørring =

Astrup
- Village
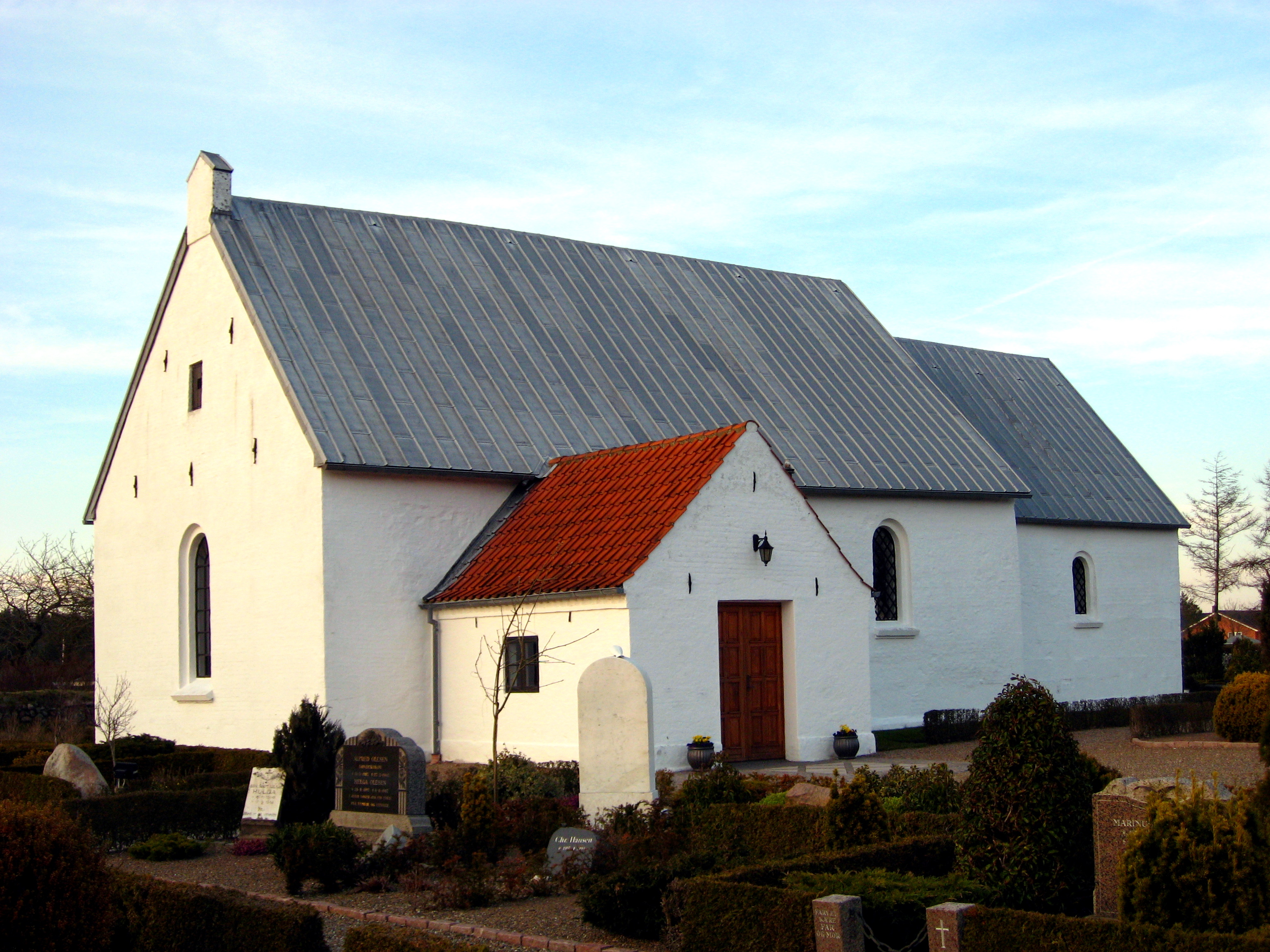
- Astrup church

- Location within Denmark
- Coordinates: 57°28′49″N 10°5′37″E
- Country: Denmark
- Region: North Denmark (Nordjylland)
- Municipality: Hjørring

Population (2026)
  - Total: 529
- Time zone: UTC+1 (Central European Time)
  - Summer (DST): UTC+2 (Central European Summer Time)

Astrup is a village in Hjørring Municipality, Denmark.
