= Bindslev, Denmark =

Bindslev
- Town
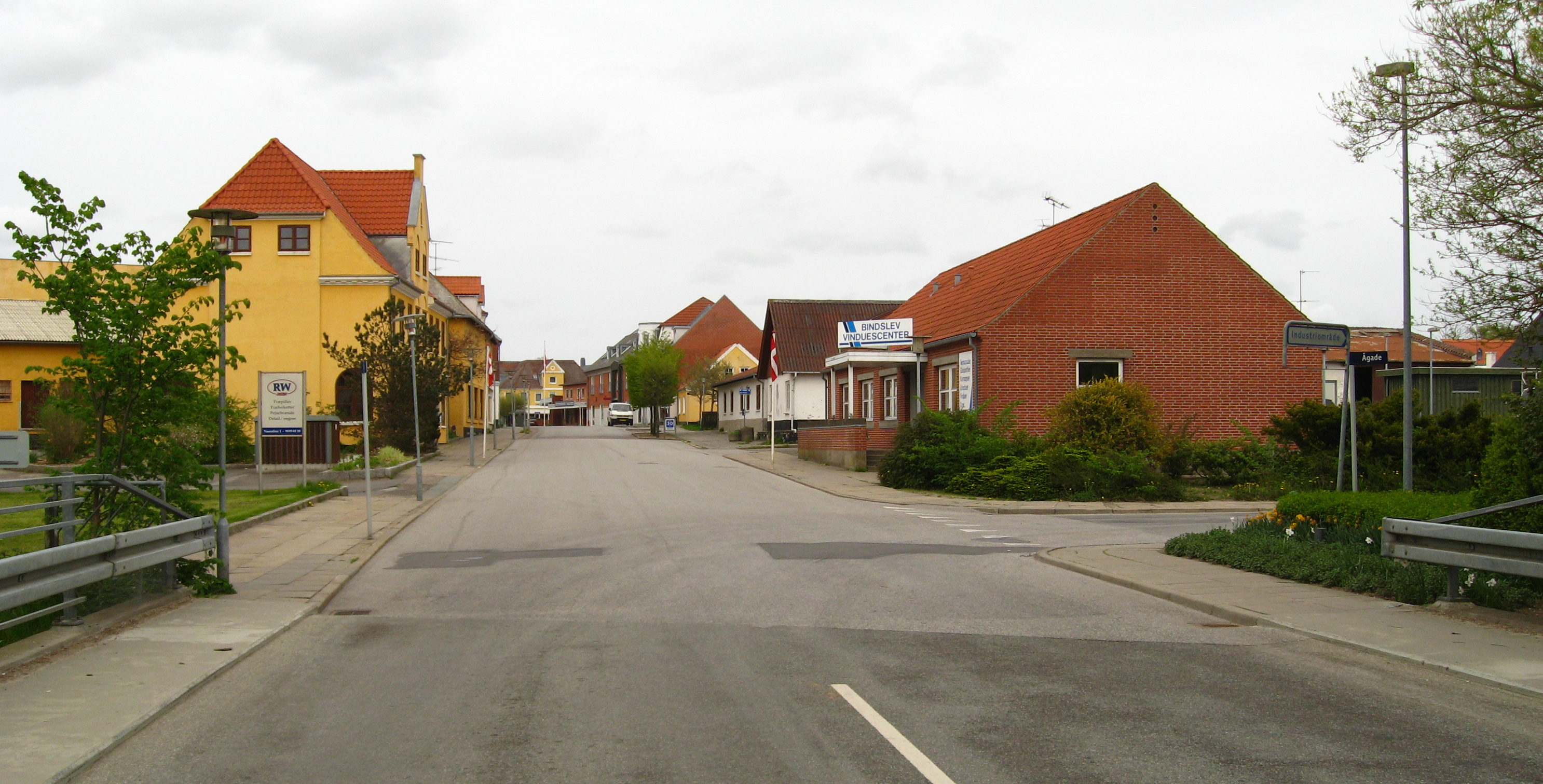
- Bindslev, Denmark 2009

- Location in North Jutland Region Bindslev (Denmark)
- Coordinates: 57°32′30″N 10°11′55″E
- Country: Denmark
- Region: North Jutland Region
- Municipality: Hjørring Municipality

Area
  - Urban: 1.11 km^{2} (0.43 sq mi)

Population (2026)
  - Urban: 963
  - Urban density: 868/km^{2} (2,250/sq mi)
- Time zone: UTC+1 (CET)
  - Summer (DST): UTC+2 (CEST)
- Postal code: DK-9881 Bindslev

Bindslev is a small town in Vendsyssel, Northern Jutland, Denmark with a population of 963 (1 January 2026).
