= Hirtshals Municipality =

Former municipality of Denmark

Coordinates: 57°35′18″N 9°58′01″E

Hirtshals Municipality was a municipality (Danish: kommune) in Denmark. It was located on the west and north coast of the Jutland peninsula and belonged to North Jutland County. It was abolished effective 1 January 2007. The municipal seat was located in the town of Hirtshals. Its last mayor was Knud Størup (independent).

== Geography ==
The municipality covered an area of 196 km^{2} (76 sq mi), and had a total population of 14,088 (2005). Besides Hirtshals, it covered the villages Tornby, Vidstrup, Asdal, Tuen, Bindslev, Tversted, Emmersbæk, Lilleheden and Horne.

== Merger ==
Hirtshals municipality ceased to exist due to Kommunalreformen ("The Municipality Reform" of 2007). It was merged with existing Hjørring, Løkken-Vrå, and Sindal municipalities to form an enlarged Hjørring municipality. This created a municipality with an area of 92 km^{2} (36 sq mi) and a total population of ca. 67,816.
