= Løkken-Vrå =

Coordinates: 57°22′N 9°43′E

Løkken-Vrå Municipality Løkken-Vrå Kommune
- Former municipality
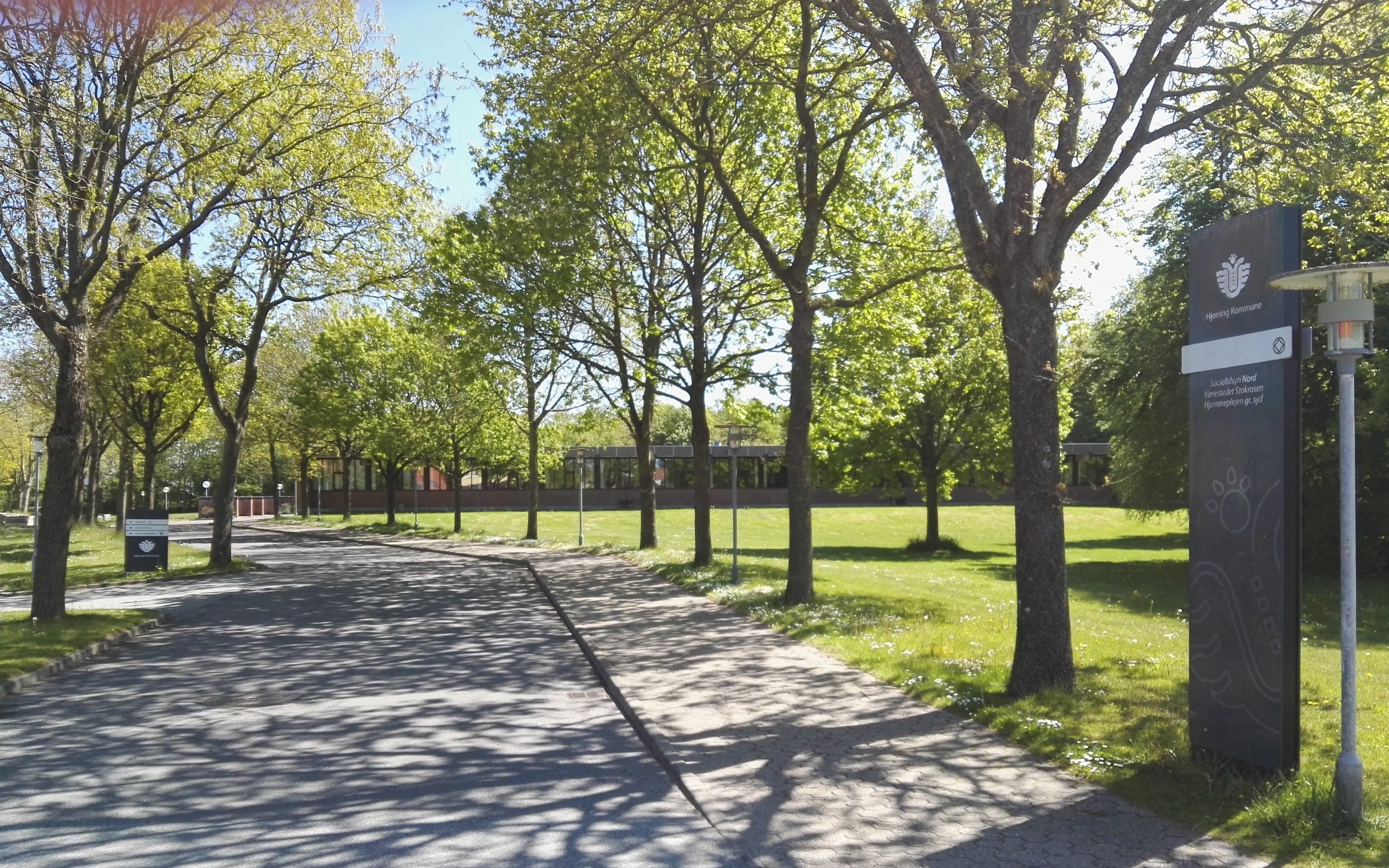
- Former town hall in Vrå
- Interactive map of Løkken-Vrå Municipality
- Country: Denmark
- County: North Jutland County
- Municipality reform of 2007: 1 January 2007

Area
  - Total: 181 km^{2} (70 sq mi)

Population (2005)
  - Total: 8,828

Løkken-Vrå was a municipality (Danish, kommune) in the North Jutland County, Denmark until 1 January 2007. It was located on the northwest coast of the island of Vendsyssel-Thy on the northern Jutland peninsula.

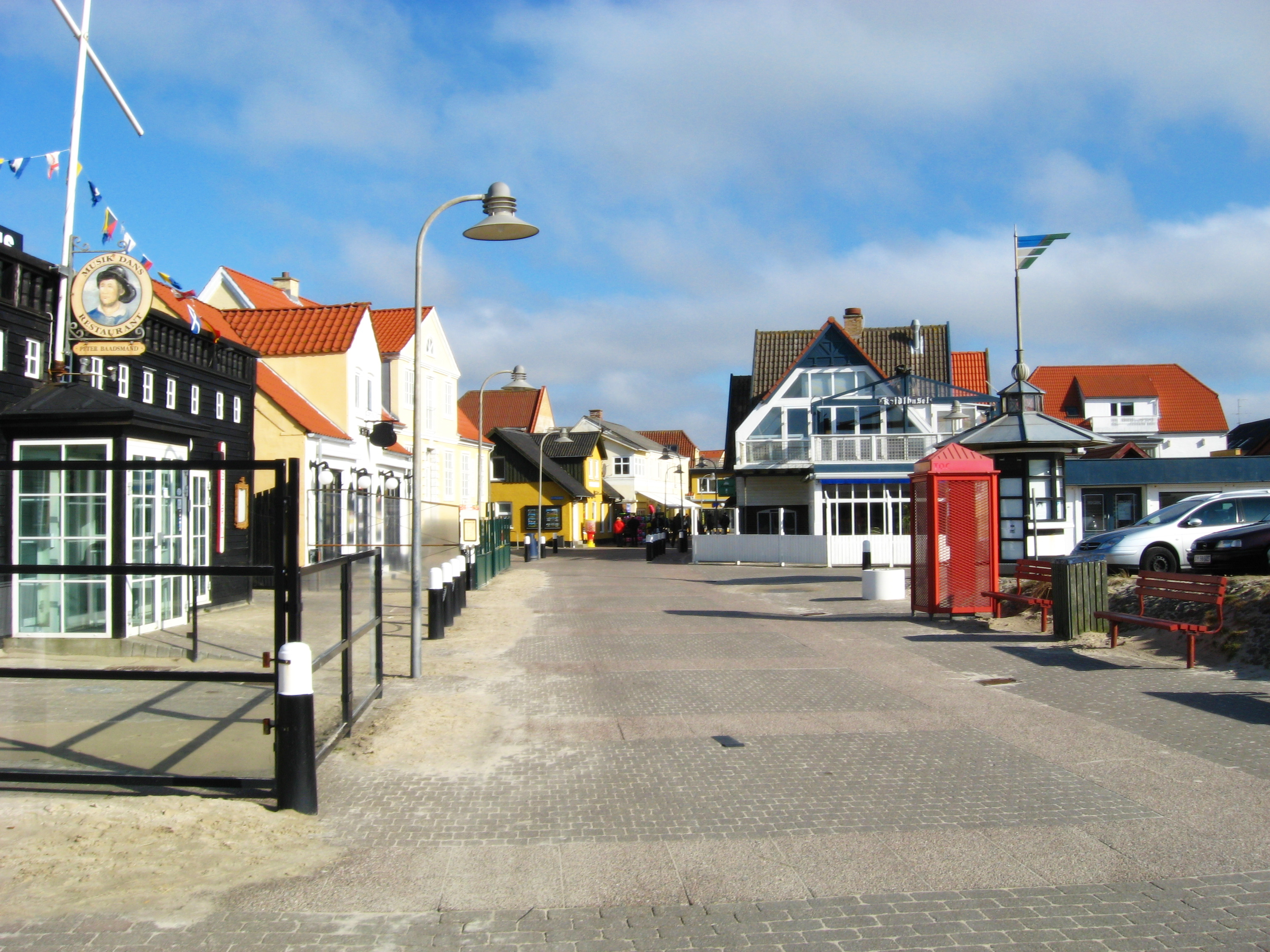
The town of Løkken

The municipality covered an area of 181 km^{2} (70 sq mi), and had a total population of 8,828 (2005). The two main towns were Vrå and Løkken, where Vrå acted as the seat of the municipal council.

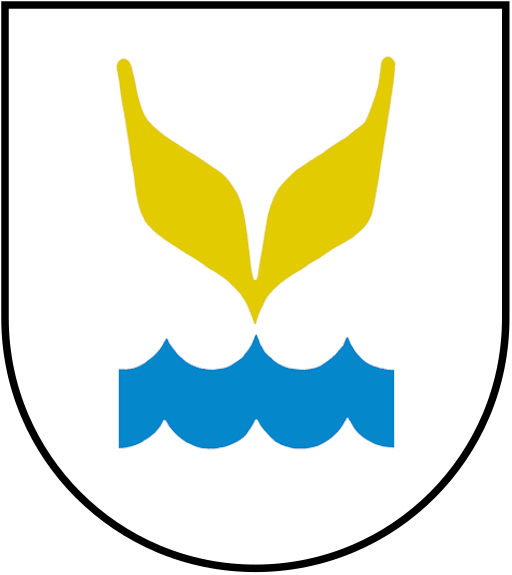
Coat of arms of Løkken-Vrå municipality

Løkken-Vrå municipality ceased to exist following the Municipality Reform of 2007 (Danish: kommunalreformen). It was merged with existing Hjørring, Hirtshals, and Sindal municipalities to form an enlarged Hjørring municipality with a total area of 929 km^{2} (359 sq mi) and a total population of ca. 67,816. The new municipality belongs to Region Nordjylland ("North Jutland Region").

== Mayors ==
- Valdemar Langthjem, 1970–1975
- Jens Baggesen, 1975–1986
- Søren Jensen, 1986–1987
- Birte Andersen, 1986–1994
- Knud Rødbro, 1994–2007

== Notable people ==
- Katja Schumann (born 1949) a retired circus performer; in 2015 she purchased a dilapidated former pig farm in Løkken-Vrå, renovated the property into a working animal farm, seasonal circus, and museum.
- Lone Træholt (born 1958 in Løkken) the first woman in the Danish armed forces to obtain the rank of General
