= Tårs =

- Town
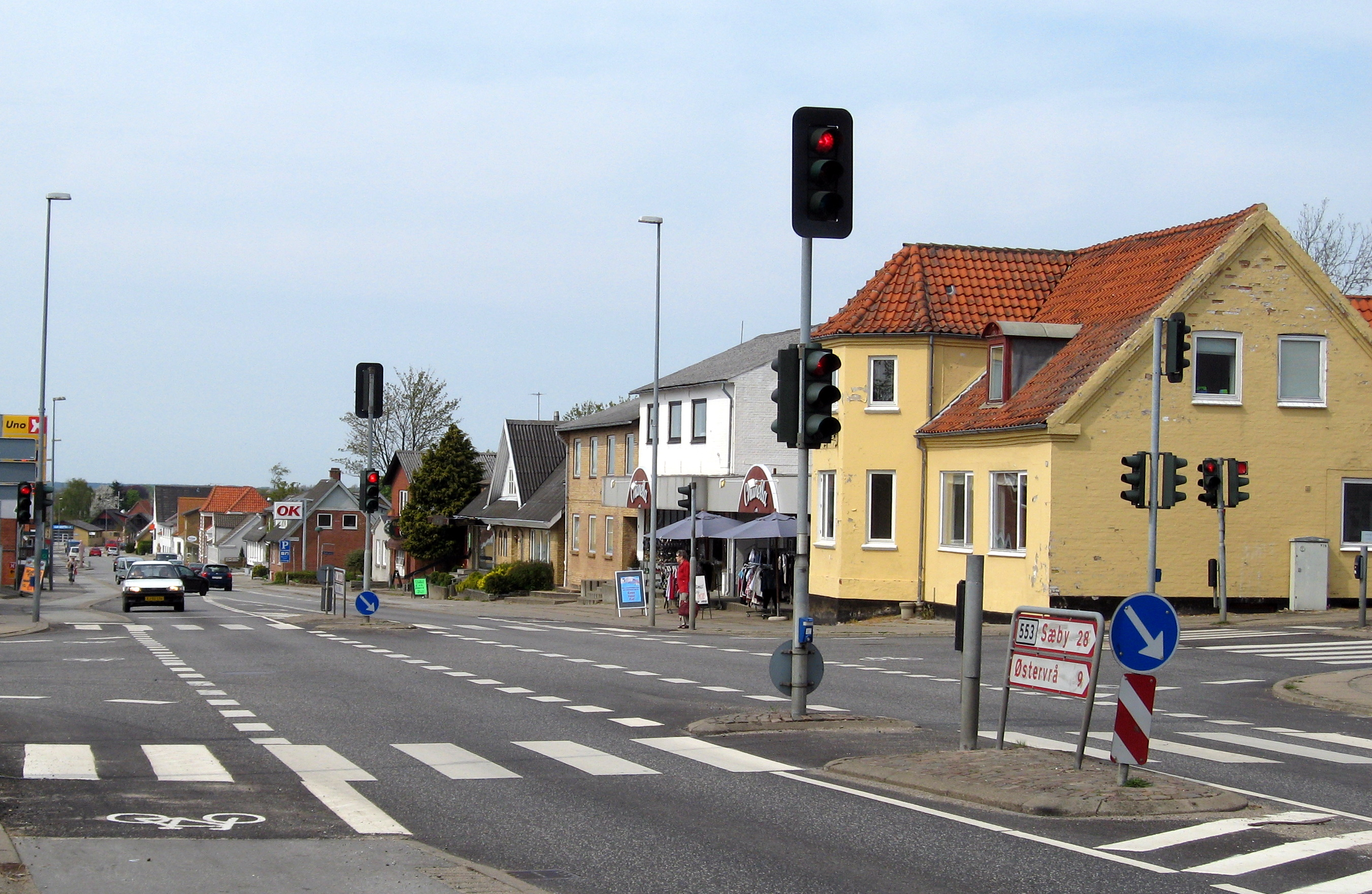
- the main street in Tårs

- Location in Denmark Tårs (North Jutland Region)
- Coordinates: 57°23′4″N 10°6′52″E
- Country: Denmark
- Region: North Jutland Region
- Municipality: Hjørring Municipality

Area
  - Urban: 1.5 km^{2} (0.58 sq mi)

Population (2026)
  - Urban: 1,825
  - Urban density: 1,200/km^{2} (3,200/sq mi)
- Time zone: UTC+1 (CET)
  - Summer (DST): UTC+2 (CEST)
- Postal code: DK-9830 Tårs

Tårs is a Danish town with a population of 1,825 (1 January 2026) situated in Vendsyssel, the northern part of Jutland. Tårs is a part of Hjørring Municipality.

== History ==
The name of the village probably originates from the Nordic god Thor. The area was in 1264 mentioned as Thorse, which could mean Thor's sanctuary.

== Notable people ==
- Eigil Nielsen (1948 in Tårs – 2019) a Danish footballer who played as a midfielder, mainly in Switzerland
- Sisse Fisker (born 1976 in Tårs) a Danish TV presenter
