= Hjørring Municipality =

Hjørring Municipality Hjørring Kommune (Danish)
- Municipality
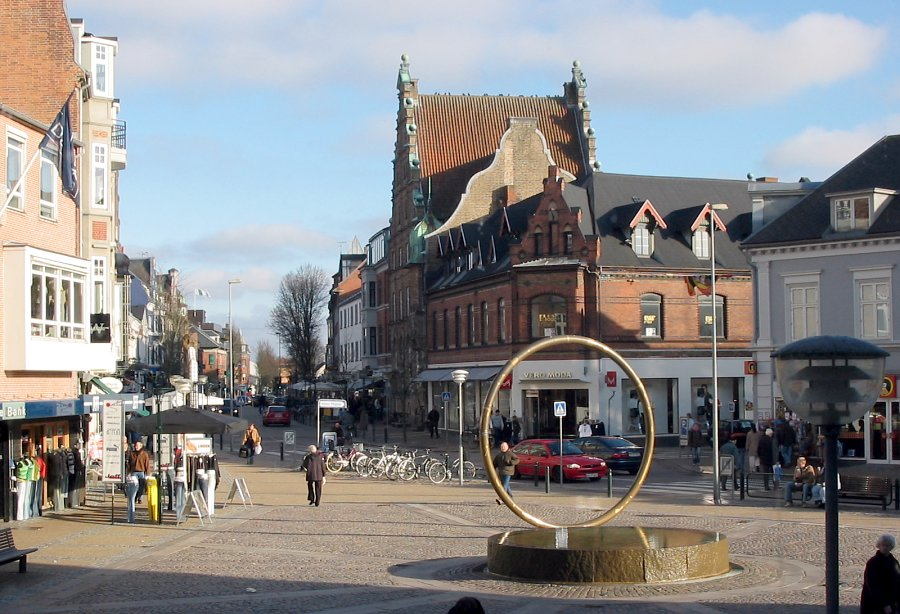
- Hjørring - Springvandspladsen

- Coat of arms

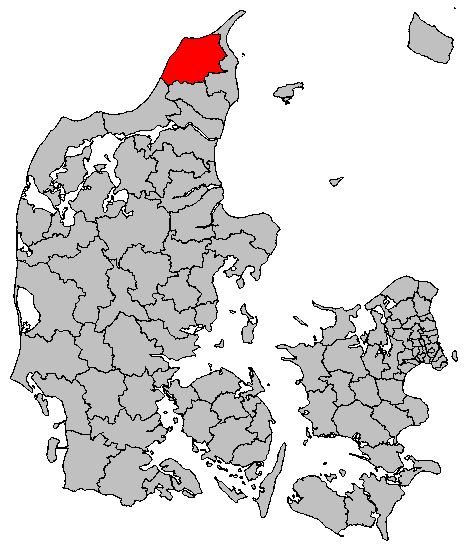
- Hjørring [in red] is north of Aalborg, off Denmark's Jutland peninsula.
- Coordinates: 57°28′00″N 9°59′00″E
- Country: Denmark
- Region: North Jutland
- Seat: Hjørring

Government
  - Mayor: Søren Smalbro

Area
  - Total: 929.58 km^{2} (358.91 sq mi)

Population (1 January 2026)
  - Total: 62,979
  - Density: 67.750/km^{2} (175.47/sq mi)
- Time zone: UTC1 (CET)
  - Summer (DST): UTC2 (CEST)
- Website: www.hjoerring.dk

Hjørring Municipality (Danish: Hjørring Kommune) is a municipality (Danish: kommune) in North Jutland Region on the west coast of the island of Vendsyssel-Thy at the top of the Jutland peninsula in northern Denmark. The municipality covers an area of 929.58 km^{2} (358.91 sq mi), making it the largest in Vendsyssel, and it has a total population of 62,979 (2026).

The main town and the site of its municipal council is the town of Hjørring. Other towns in the municipality includes the harbour town of Hirtshals to the north, sea side resorts Løkken and Lønstrup to the west, Tårs and Vrå to the south and Sindal and Bindslev to the East.

Hjørring	25,600
Hirtshals	5,700
Sindal	3,000
Vrå	2,500

Tårs	1,900
Løkken	1,600
Bindslev	1,000
Tornby	1,000

On 1 January 2007 Hjørring municipality was, as the result of Kommunalreformen ("The Municipal Reform" of 2007), merged with existing Hirtshals, Løkken-Vrå, and Sindal municipalities to form an enlarged Hjørring municipality.

== The town of Hjørring ==
The town of Hjørring is the largest town in Vendsyssel and has a population of 24,789 (2004). It is one of Denmark's oldest towns, and it celebrated its 750-year anniversary as a market town in 1993.

Archaeological discoveries show that the area was already populated 10,000 years ago.

A major fire burned down much of the town in 1819.

The educational opportunities in the town include a gymnasium (the Danish equivalent of a high school/pre college), a business gymnasium (vocational education), and a school for the education of nurses.

== Politics ==
=== Municipal council ===
Hjørring's municipal council consists of 31 members, elected every four years.

Below is the current council composition

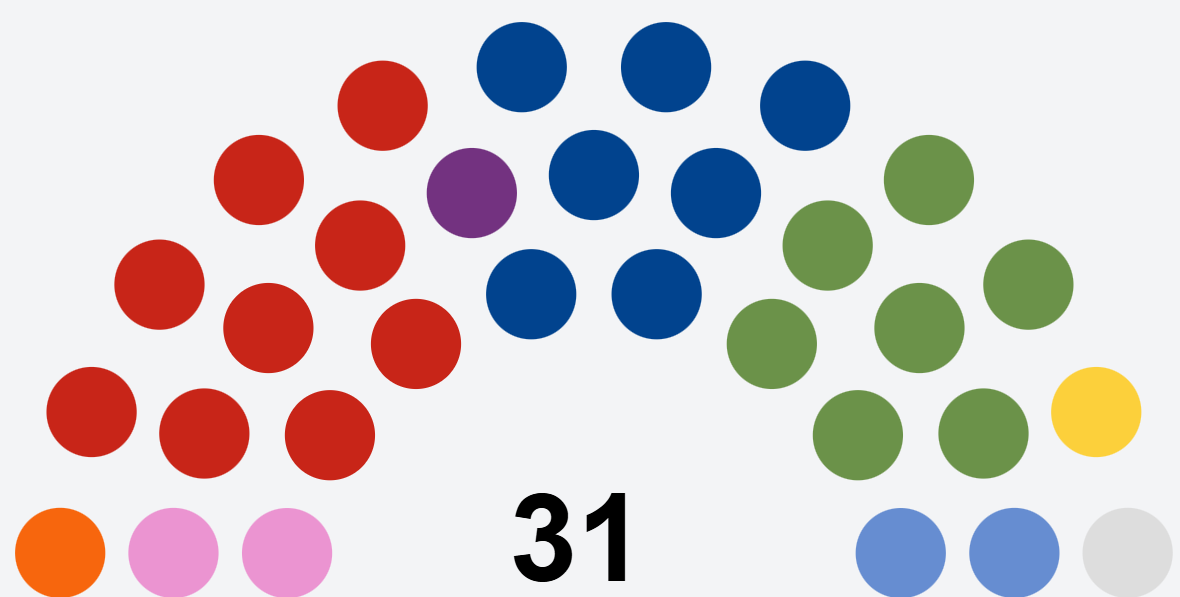

Below are the municipal councils elected between the enactment of the Municipal Reform of 2007 and the 2025 Danish local elections.

Election	Party										Total seats	Turnout	Elected mayor
Election	A	B	C	D	F	O	T	V	Ø	...	Total seats	Turnout	Elected mayor
2005	6	1	2		4	1	9	8			31	69.2%	Finn Olesen (A)
2009	9		2		3	1	5	11			31	65.6%	Arne Boelt (A)
2013	13		4		1	2	2	8	1		31	74.0%	Arne Boelt (A)
2017	15		3		1	2	2	7	1		31	71.4%	Arne Boelt (A)
2021	10	1	7	1	1	1		9	1		31	68.1%	Søren Smalbro (V)
Data from Kmdvalg.dk 2005, 2009, 2013 and 2017

== See also ==
- Rubjerg Knude lighthouse
