= Vrå =

- Town
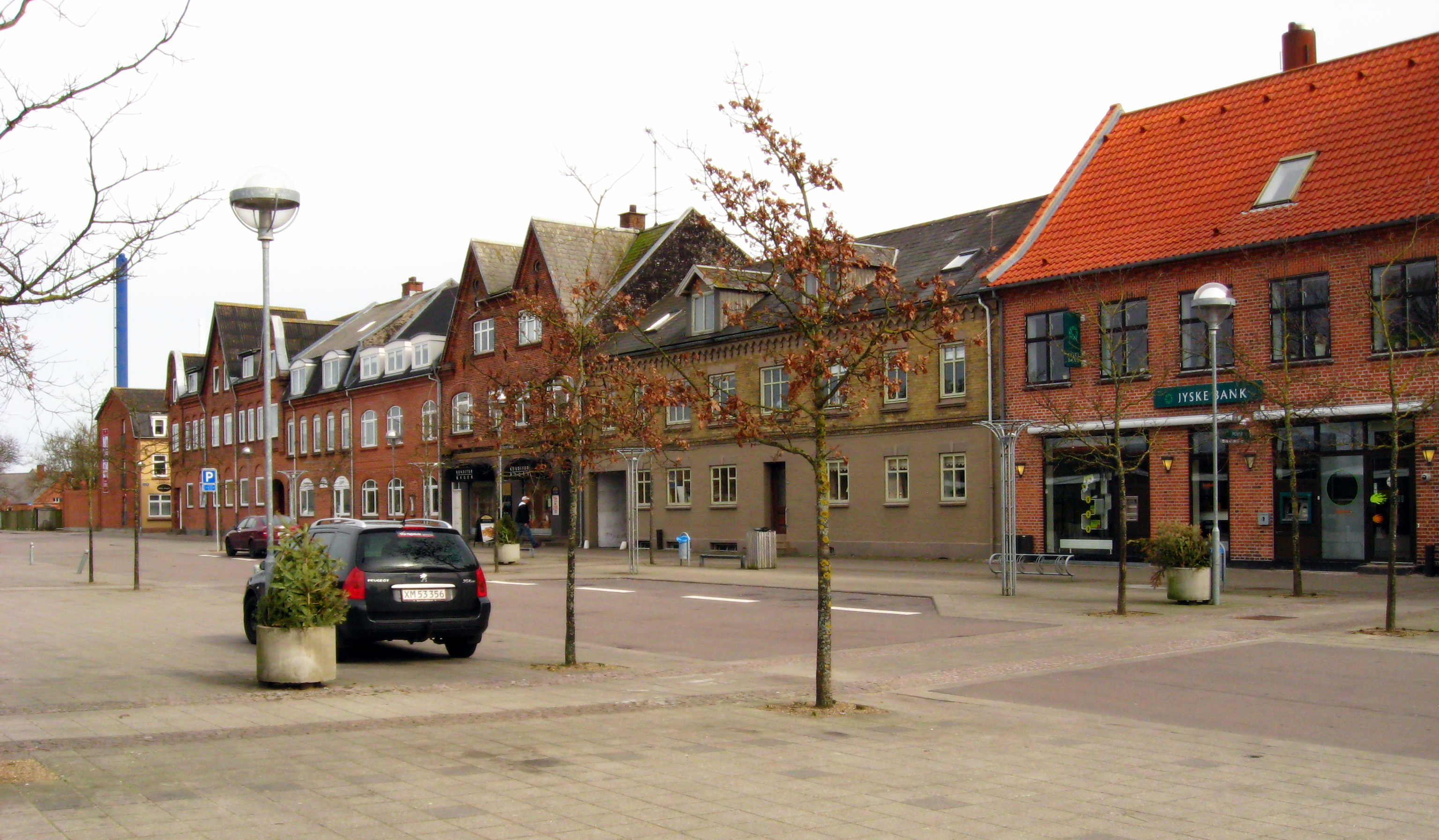
- Town center
- Motto: Et godt sted at bo
- Location in Denmark Vrå (North Jutland Region)
- Coordinates: 57°21′17″N 9°56′31″E
- Country: Denmark
- Region: North Jutland Region
- Municipality: Hjørring Municipality

Area
  - Urban: 2.3 km^{2} (0.89 sq mi)

Population (2026)
  - Urban: 2,662
  - Urban density: 1,200/km^{2} (3,000/sq mi)
- Time zone: UTC+1 (CET)
  - Summer (DST): UTC+2 (CEST)
- Postal code: DK-9760 Vrå

Vrå is a railway town in Hjørring municipality, Denmark. It was the former municipal seat of the abolished Løkken-Vrå municipality. As of 1 January 2026, Vrå has a population of 2,662.

== History ==
In 1370, the town's name was documented as Wra, with later iterations of Vraa, Wraa, and Vro. In Danish, "Vrå" means nook or corner. Despite its long history, Vrå was only a small farming community until the late 19th century, when a station was constructed on the Vendsyssel railway line. The station building was erected in 1870 and the railway opened in 1871. The town largely grew up around the railroad, and most buildings were constructed after its completion. The town's population grew rapidly following the construction of the railroad; in 1850 the population had been 691, and by 1901 had grown to 1,594. The city is divided by the railway, the majority of the town's commercial buildings are on the east side.

The town is home to Vrå Højskole, a folk high school. It was originally founded in 1872 in the small town of Stenum, 7 kilometers southwest of Vrå. As the school grew, proposals were made to move it closer to the central railway in the region. In 1890, it officially relocated to Vrå. The school originally taught language, mathematics, and agricultural courses, catering to the local agricultural community. Since the mid 1900s, it has focused on the creative arts. The school collaborates with Kunstbygningen, an exhibit for art. Its exhibitions began in 1942, then primarily showing works donated by its founder, Svend Engelund.

== Religion ==
Vrå church (Danish: Vrå Kirke) is located 9 kilometers north of Brønderslev. It operates as a parish church within the Diocese of Aalborg of the Church of Denmark. The nave was originally constructed from the late 12th to early 13th century in the romanesque style. Other later additions, including the tower, of the church are gothic. The interior of the church has a preserved fresco from c. 1510–c. 1525.

Vrå Congregational Church (Danish: Vrå Valgmenighedskirke) was founded in 1900. The church was established following an incident which saw the rejection of a priest's application to lead the parish, despite support from the community. Today the congregation has approximately 350 members. The church follows Grundtvigian theology, and is affiliated with the Church of Denmark.

There is also a Baptist church and an Inner Mission in Vrå.

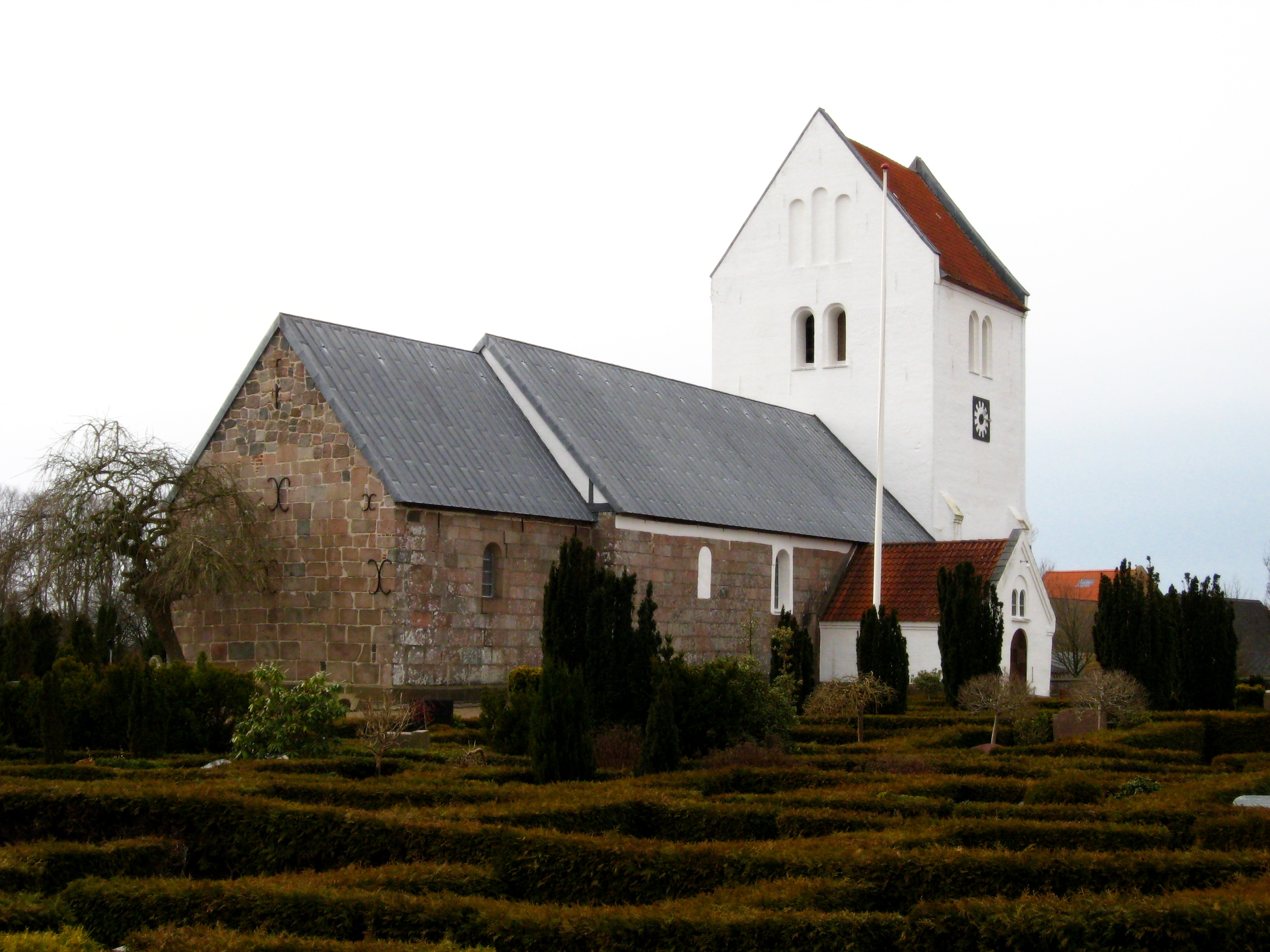
Vrå Church (Vrå Kirke)

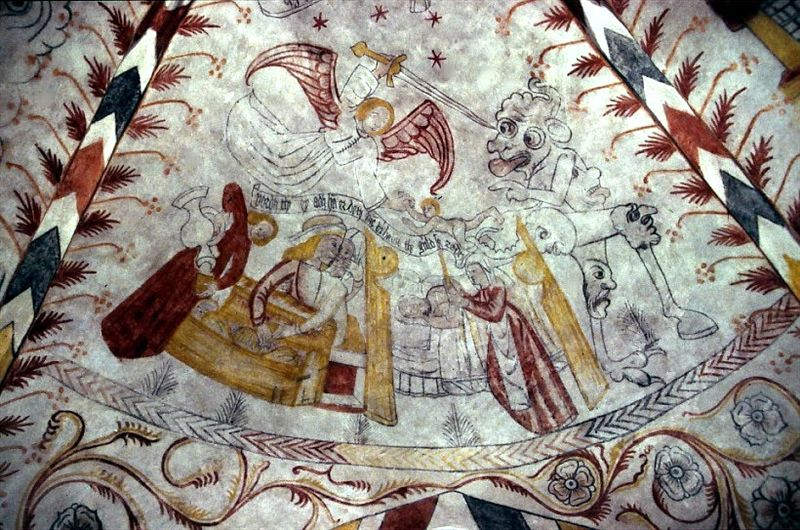
Fresco at Vrå Church

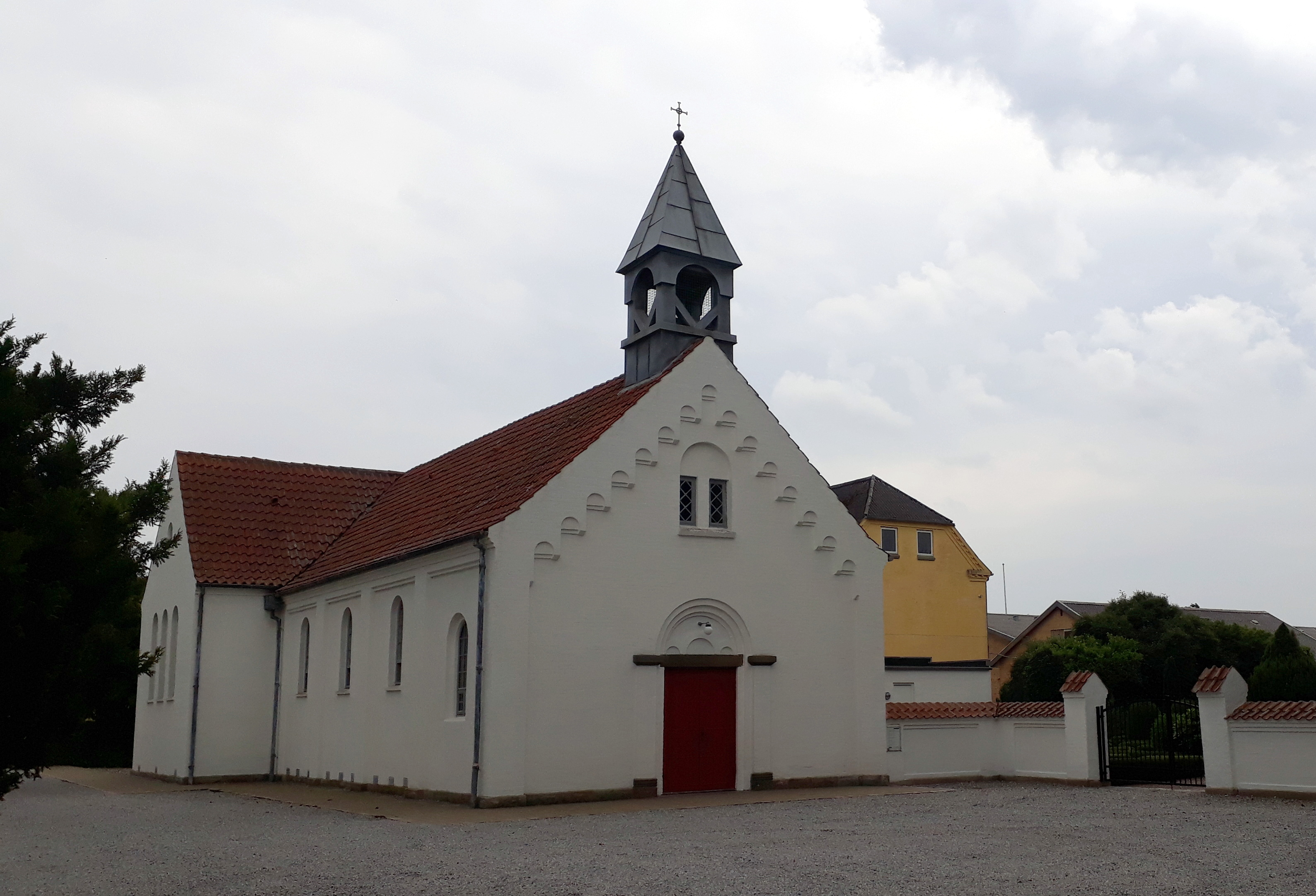
Vrå Congregational Church (Vrå Valgmenighedskirken)

== Transport ==
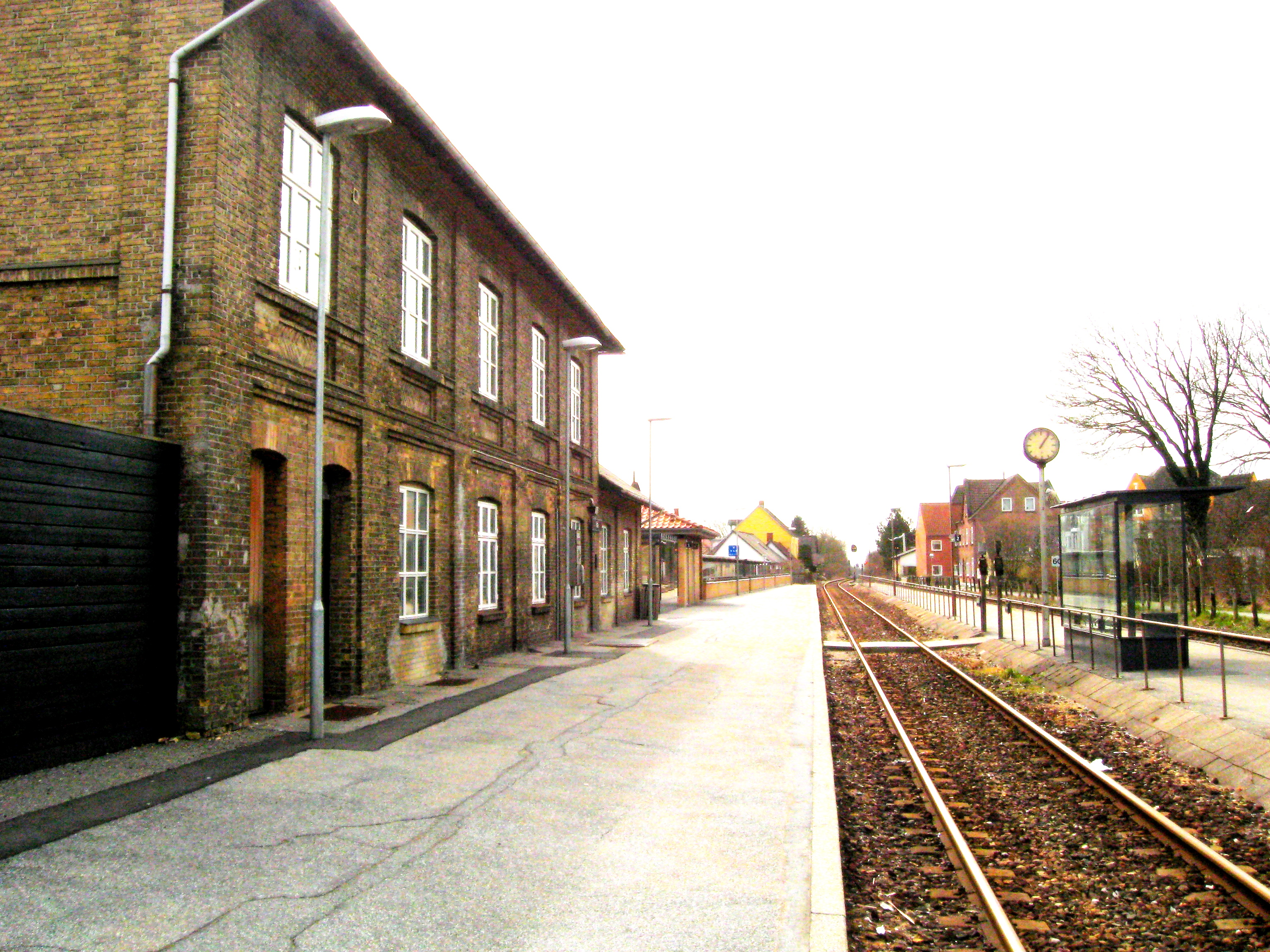
Vrå railway station

Vrå is served by Vrå railway station, located on the Vendsyssel railway line between Aalborg and Frederikshavn.
