= Løkken, Denmark =

Løkken
- Town
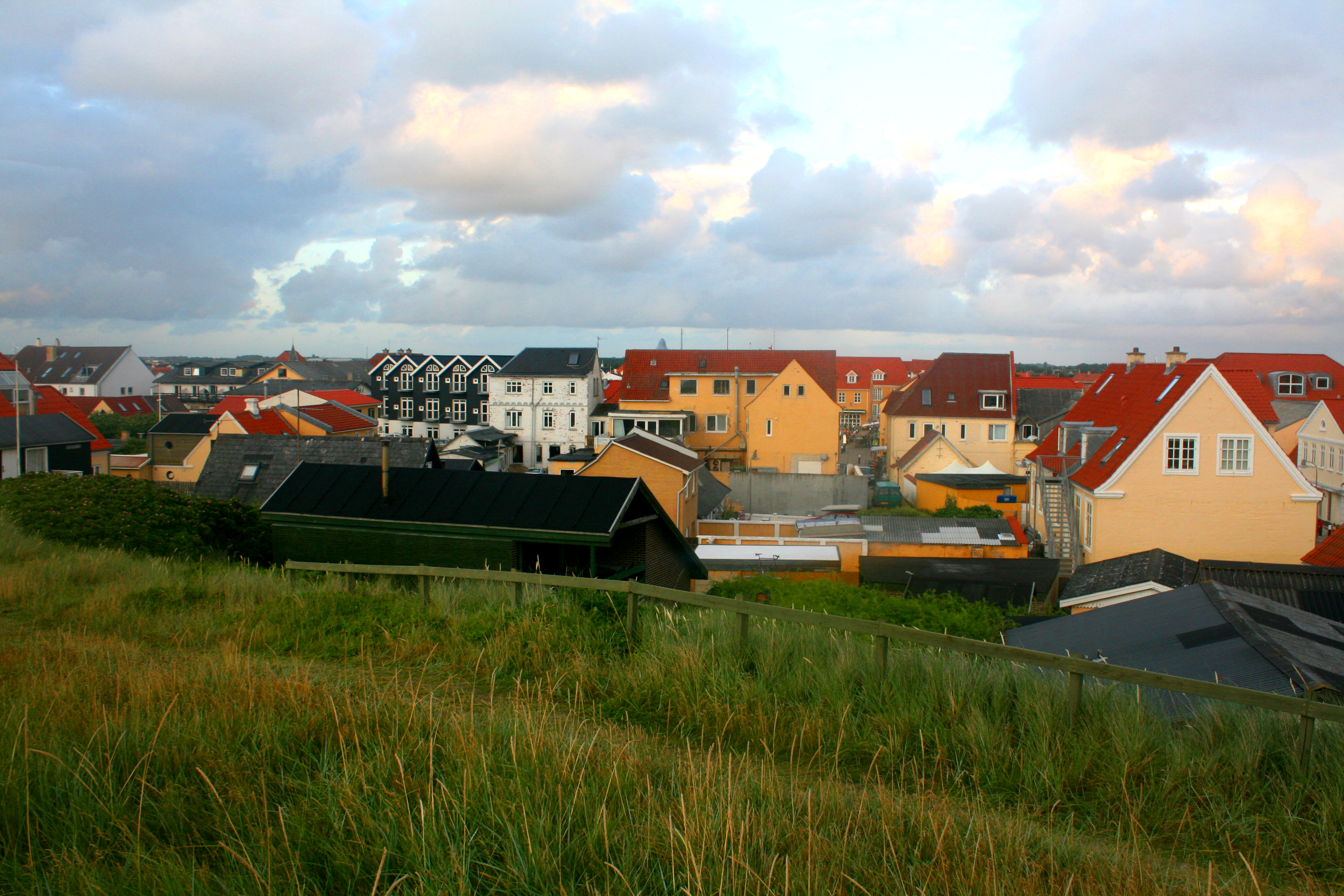
- Løkken seen from the dunes near the beach

- Location in Denmark Løkken (North Jutland Region)
- Coordinates: 57°22′14″N 9°43′00″E
- Country: Denmark
- Region: North Jutland Region
- Municipality: Hjørring Municipality
- Founded: 1678

Area
  - Urban: 2.6 km^{2} (1.0 sq mi)

Population (2026)
  - Urban: 1,674
  - Urban density: 640/km^{2} (1,700/sq mi)
- Time zone: UTC+01:00 (Central European Time)
- Postal code: 9480 Løkken

Løkken is a town in Vendsyssel, Denmark with a population of 1,674 (1 January 2026). The town has historically been referred to as Løchen or Lykken. Originally, the town began as a fishing village with a successful shipping trade; today it is a popular tourist and vacationing destination.

The town is located in Hjørring Municipality within the North Jutland Region. Prior to the municipal reforms of 2007, Løkken had been part of Løkken-Vrå Municipality.

== History ==
=== Merchant town ===
The town was founded in 1698 with the erection of the first house, which functioned as an inn. The inn was built and operated by Simon Sørensen and his wife Else Christensdatter. For many years, the area was called Furreby Løkke, meaning "fenced field beside Furreby". It wasn't until the 19th century that the spelling Løkken was widely adopted; the town had previously been referred to by various spellings, including: Löchen, Lÿchen, Lÿcken, and Lÿkken.

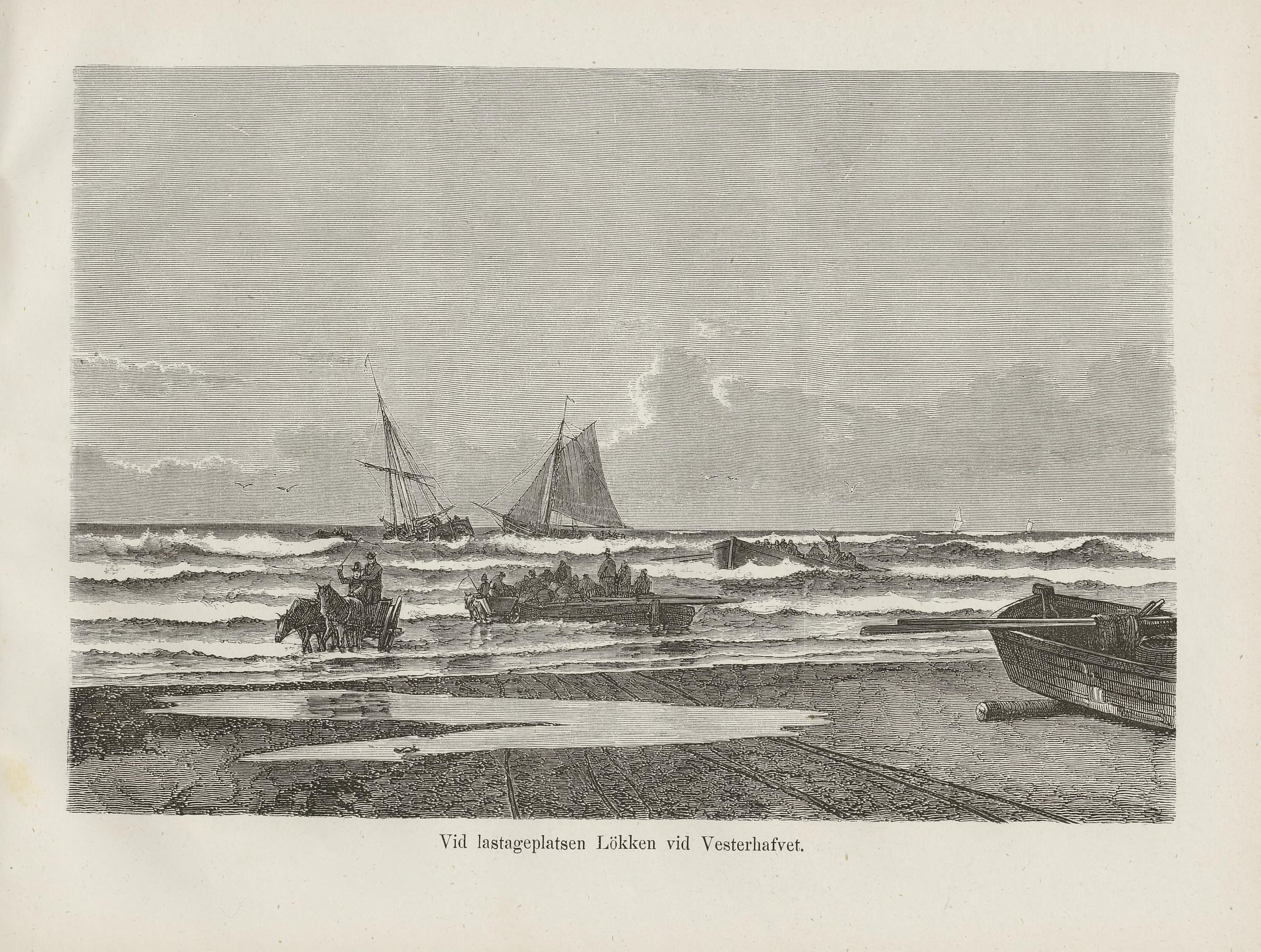
"At the loading site in Lökken by the north sea," 1873

By 1715, there were fifteen houses in the village and it had begun to be settled by sailors who traded with Norwegian merchants. The village continued to grow and established itself as an important trading location between northern Denmark and southern Norway, where grain, butter, and meat were exchanged for northern iron and wood. The towns population in 1801 was 217, and by 1901 had grown to 1,067. In 1875, the town was recorded as having 87 houses, mainly built out of brick along with some thatched houses, though there were no established streets. It was characterized as a merchant town and noted for its shipping industry and trade between England and Norway.

A large number of ships from this era were stranded or wreaked in the waters around Løkken. When the Danish rescue service was established in 1851, the town was one of the first places to be outfitted with a rescue station to save sailors from sinking or stranded ships. The station had a crew of twelve men who would row a small boat out to sea while their captain operated its rudder. The crew were on call at all hours, and were contractually obligated to find a man to replace them if they planned to leave their post for more than 24 hours.

The town was, at one point, one of the largest fishing villages on Denmark's western coast. In 1898, there were approximately 180 fishermen employed in Løkken, mainly fishing for cod and haddock. The population of fish in the area had already dropped significantly by this time, however, and the fishing industry had begun to fall into decline. There are only a few professional fishermen left in Løkken as well as a small recreational fishing community. Løkken's history as a fishing village is preserved at the town's Coastal Fisheries Museum and the Løkken Museum.

=== Railway town ===
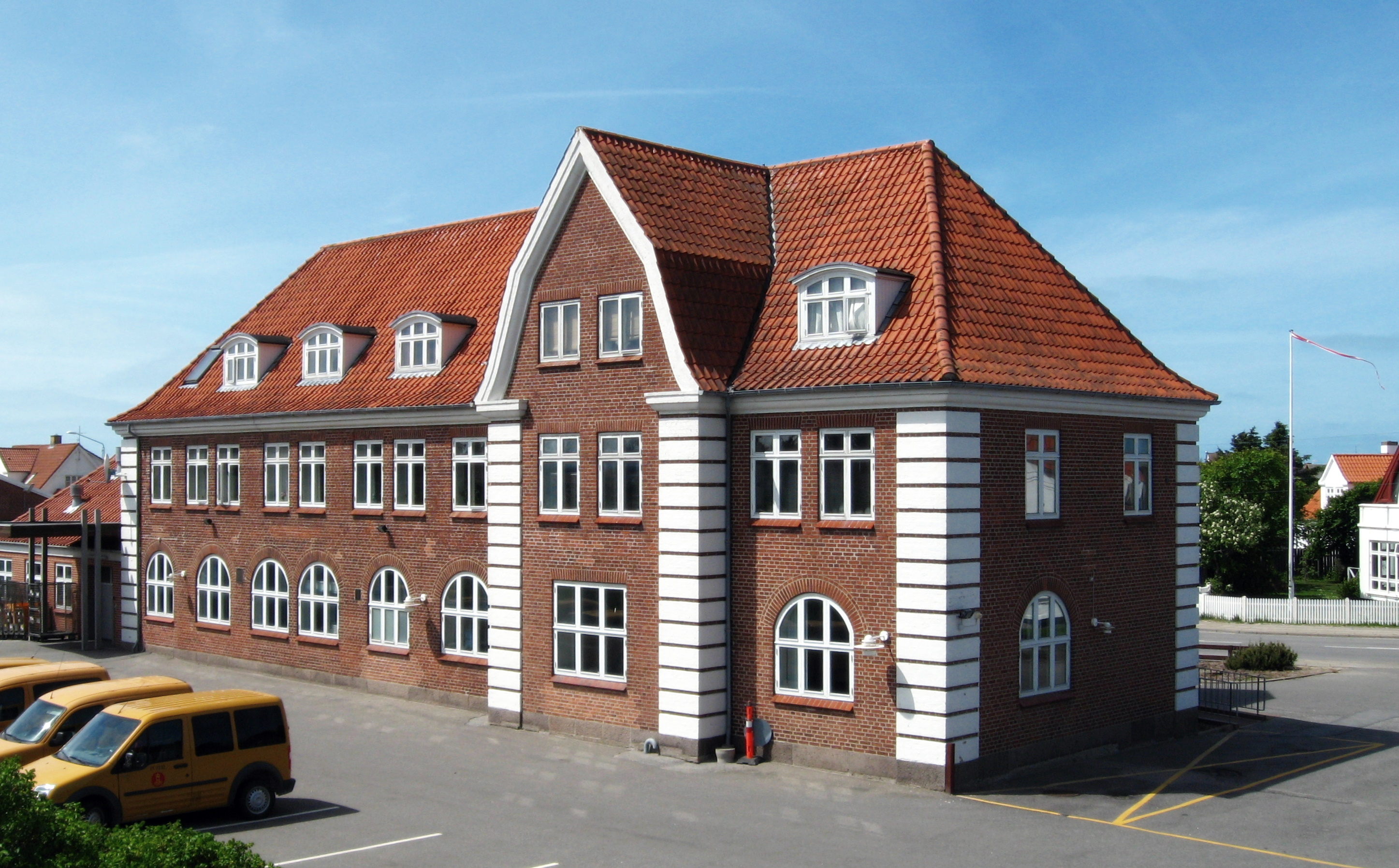
Løkken station

Løkken was the largest intermediate station on the former Hjørring-Løkken-Aabybro Railway, also called the Løkken Track (Løkkenbanen). The railway was operational from 1913 until 1963 and initially transported fish caught in Løkken to inland regions. The station had two platforms, four tracks, and a railway turntable. The station building, which was designed by Sylvius Knutzen and expanded in 1944, has been preserved on south-eastern end of the town since the railway's closure.

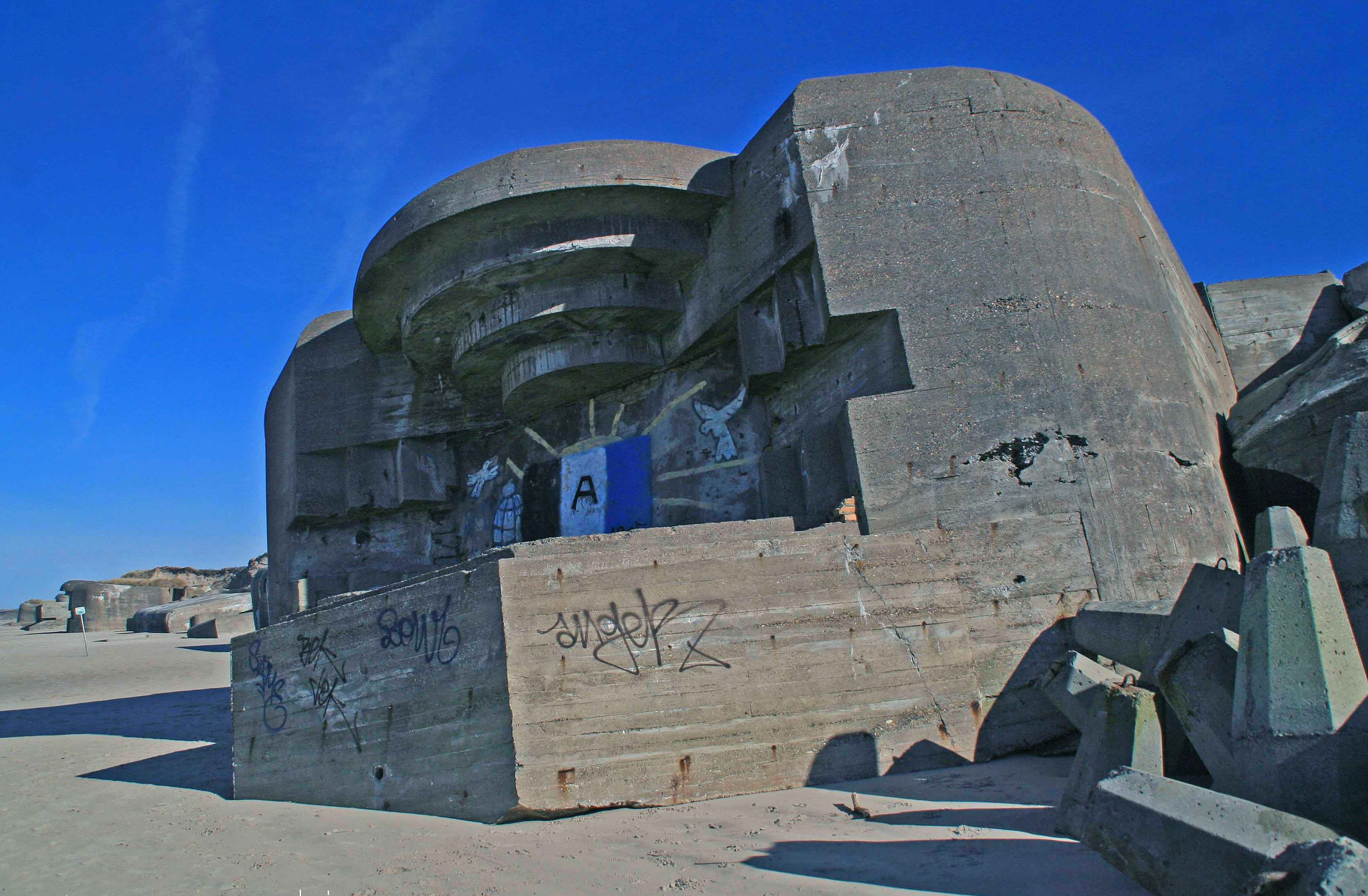
A WWII bunker, built during the German occupation, on the beach near Løkken

During the occupation of Denmark in the Second World War, the railway was used extensively to transport materials for the fortification of Jutland's west coast. Just north of Løkken, German forces erected Furreby Naval Battery (Furreby Kystbatteri) and a narrow gauge track was laid out between the station in Løkken and the beach. A large number of concrete bunkers built during the occupation remain along the beach to this day, though they are in severe disrepair.

Because the railway made it possible for vacationers from larger cities, such as Aalborg, to visit the beach at Løkken on day trips, it greatly benefited the town's tourism industry. Specific trains with twenty to thirty carriages ran during the summer to transport vacationers. Some additional freight cars were fitted with benches in order to offer additional 3rd class passenger wagons to the large number of travelers.

=== Tourism ===
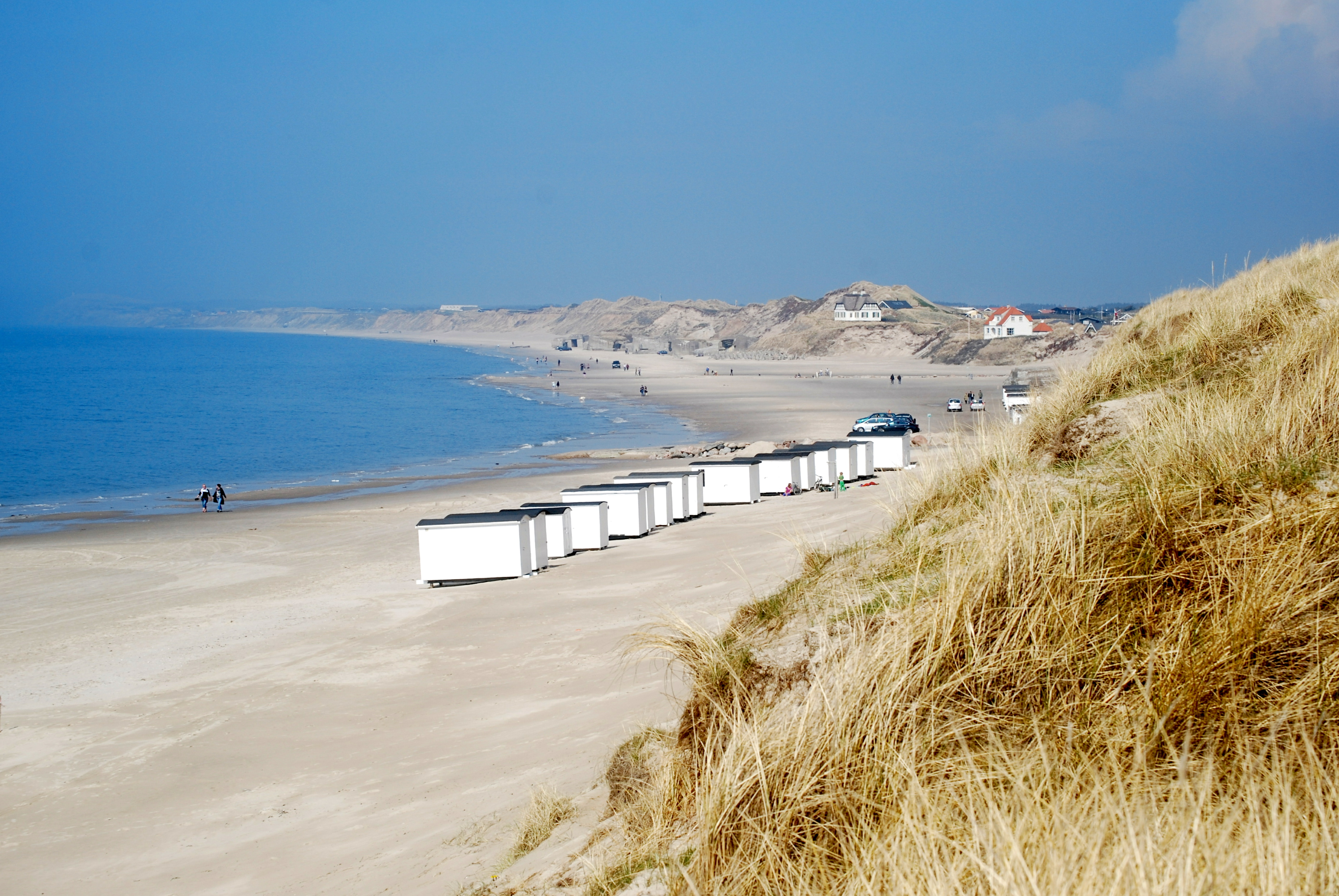
Beach huts on Løkken beach

Though there were occasional "bathers" that visited the beach in Løkken, it was not until the Løkken Badehotel (bathing hotel) opened in 1895 that tourists were drawn to the town in significant numbers. At the time, it was quite popular among the upper class to spend several weeks at rural beach hotels, and the guests which stayed at the Badehotel were generally quite wealthy, as few people could afford the hotel rates for such an extended period of time. The Badehotel brought money and business to Løkken and tourism began to phase out the fishing and shipping industries that originally established the town.

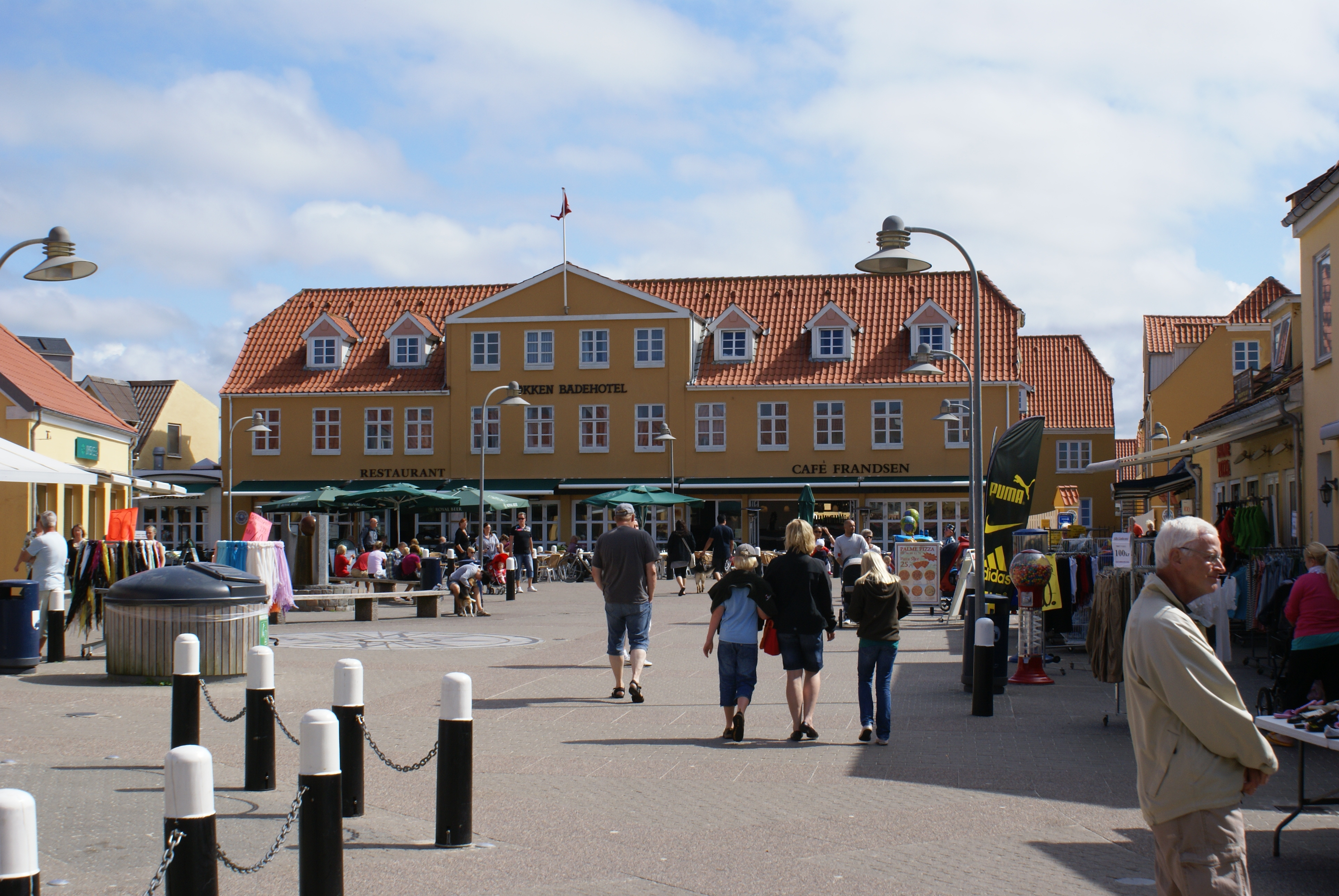
Løkken Badehotel

Several other hotels were built, and the town began to be regularly crowded with bathers during the summer. A newspaper in 1920 reported that almost every residential home in Løkken had at least one room rented out to vacationers.

Today, Løkken has a total of three camping locations and three bed and breakfasts, as well as many vacation homes and apartments which are rented out. The original beach hotel has since been acquired by a corporation which restored, modernized, and divided the hotel into vacation apartments. It now stands near the town center and has a restaurant.

== Geography ==
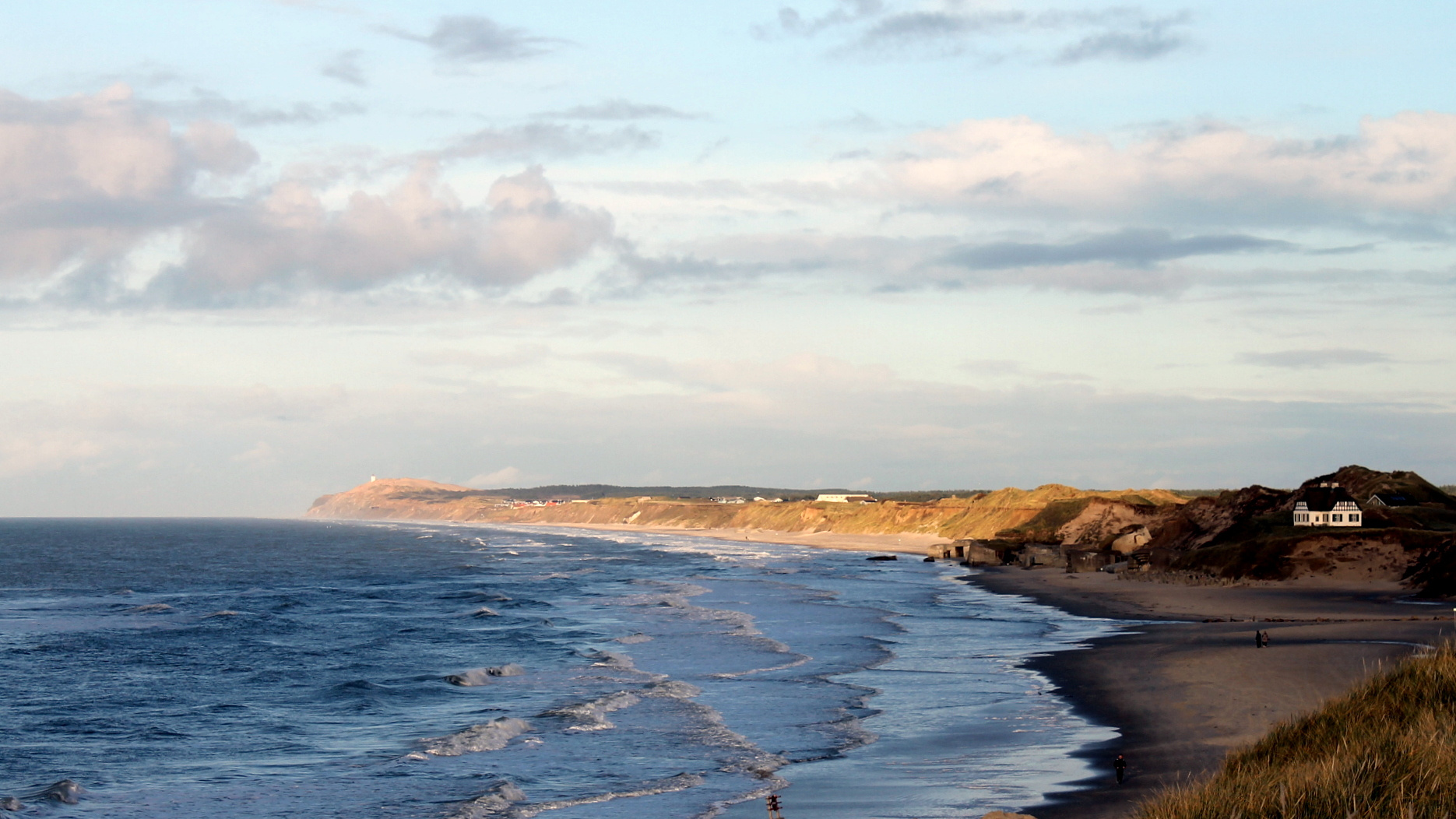
Lønstrup Klint and Rubjerg Knude Fyr as seen from the beach in Løkken

Løkken is located on the southern end of Lønstrup Klint, a series of cliffs on the western peninsula of Jutland. The highest point of the cliffs, Rubjerg Knude, has been covered by shifting sands that have threatened Rubjerg Knude Lighthouse. Børglum Kloster, which now functions as a museum, is five kilometers east of Løkken.

To the south, the Løkken beach stretches for 19 km to Rødhus, past the villages of Blokhus, Grønhøj, and Saltum. The beach is highly compacted and can be driven on by cars year round. Several of the dune and meadow areas inland from the beach between Løkken and Rødhus have been protected since 1962 in order to prevent vacation houses from being built. There are seven separate protected locations, which cover a total of 415 hectares.

== Religion ==
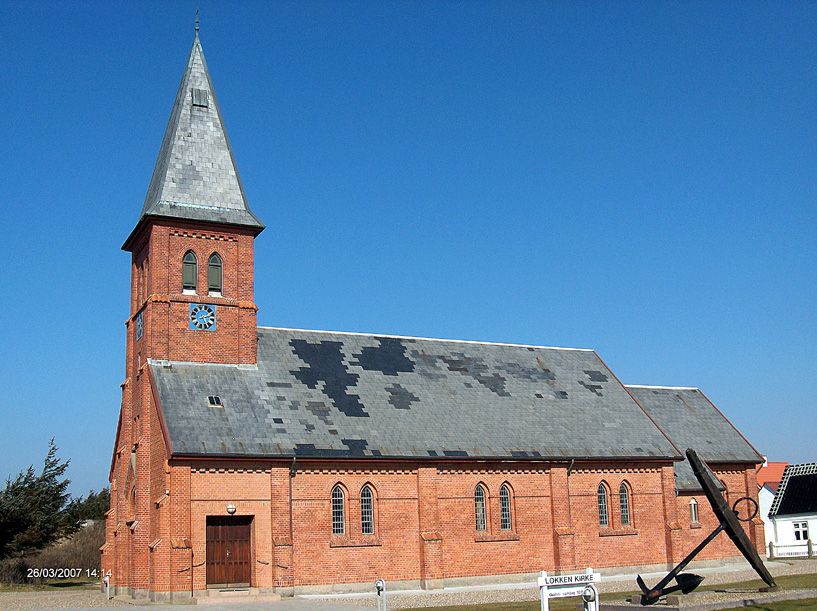
Løkken Church

No fewer than 18 Christian denominations have had congregations in Løkken. The first church built in Løkken was a Methodist church in 1882. The Methodist congregation was dissolved in 2012, when only four members remained.

Like most of Denmark, the Church of Denmark is the town's largest denomination. In 1898, Løkken Church was built in the center of the town and is part of the Church of Denmark's parish Løkken-Furreby Sogn. The only other church in the parish, Furreby Kirke, is a small romanesque church without a tower located on the northern side of Løkken in the former village of Furreby.

Løkken Frikirke (free church) was built in 2004 by Det Danske Missionsforbund, which is an independent Lutheran church.

== Notable people ==
- Lone Træholt (born 1958 in Løkken), first female general in the Danish armed forces
- Sam Nikolajsen (born 1961 in Løkken), motorcycle speedway rider
- Karen Dahlerup (resident of Løkken from 1984), politician and deputy mayor of Løkken-Vrå
- Katja Schumann (resident of Løkken since 2015), retired circus performer and equestrienne
