= List of churches in Hjørring Municipality =

This list of churches in Hjørring Municipality lists church buildings in Hjørring Municipality, Denmark.

== List ==
=== Church of Denmark ===
These churches are part of the Church of Denmark:

Name	Location	Year	Coordinates	Image	Refs
Asdal Church	Asdal	ca. 1450	57°33′12.24″N 10°1′47.99″E		
Astrup Church	Astrup	12th century	57°48′5″N 10°5′37″E		
Bindslev Church	Bindslev	ca. 1250	57°31′58.51″N 10°10′24.38″E		
Bistrupkirken	Hjørring	1978	57°26′38″N 9°59′55″E		
Bjergby Church	Bjergby	ca. 1200	57°30′53.28″N 10°2′50.99″E		
Børglum Church	Børglum	1937	57°21′51.23″N 9°50′37.36″E		
Em Church	Em, Vrå	12th century	57°20′38.98″N 9°54′36.61″E		
Emmersbæk Kirke	Hirtshals	1983	57°34′28.49″N 9°57′49.14″E		
Furreby Church	Løkken	ca. 1200	57°22′57.29″N 9°43′33.96″E		
Harritslev Church	Sønder Harritslev	12th century	57°26′11.58″N 9°54′09.29″E		
Hirtshals Church	Hirtshals	1908	57°35′14.21″N 9°57′47.92″E		
Horne Church	Horne	ca. 1100	57°33′34″N 9°58′44″E		
Hæstrup Church	Hæstrup	ca. 1300	57°24′49.31″N 9°58′18.15″E		
Hørmested Church	Hørmested, Sindal	ca. 1150	57°27′41″N 10°14′50″E		
Jelstrup Church	Jelstrup	13th century	57°25′37″N 9°49′4″E		
Lendum Church	Lendum, Sindal	ca. 1200	57°24′33″N 10°18′2″E		
Lyngby Church	Lyngby	1914	57°24′2″N 9°45′17″E		
Løkken Church	Løkken	1898	57°22′23.88″N 9°42′50.25″E		
Lønstrup Church	Lønstrup	1928	57°28′10″N 9°47′57″E		
Morild Church	Morild	1909	57°22′40″N 10°13′40.9″E		
Mosbjerg Church	Mosbjerg, Sindal	12th century	57°30′3.5″N 10°15′44.2″E		
Mygdal Church	Mygdal	ca. 1250	57°31′15″N 10°6′35″E		
Mårup Church	near Lønstrup	ca. 1250	57°27′45″N 9°47′4″E		
Rakkeby Church			57°24′8″N 9°55′18″E		
Rubjerg Church	Rubjerg	1904	57°24′56″N 9°46′38″E		
Sankt Catharinæ Church	Hjørring	ca. 1250	57°27′42.2″N 9°58′57″E		
Sankt Hans Church	Hjørring	13th century	57°27′46″N 9°58′55″E		
Saint Olaf's Church	Hjørring	12th century	57°27′41″N 9°59′7″E		
Sejlstrup Church	Sejlstrup	12th century	57°34′28″N 9°52′14″E		
Sindal Church	Sindal	1910	57°28′28″N 10°12′8″E		
Sindal Gamle Church	Sindal	12th century	57°29′2.58″N 10°10′48.61″E		
Skallerup Church	Skallerup	12th century	57°28′45.11″N 9°51′7.59″E		
Sørig Church	Sørig, Bindslev	1902	57°33′59″N 10°17′0″E		
Tolne Church	Tolne, Sindal	ca. 1200	57°28′15″N 10°18′51″E		
Tornby Church	Tornby	ca. 1200	57°31′38.8″N 9°56′52.7″E		
Tversted Church	Tversted	12th century	57°34′54.2″N 10°10′58″E		
Tårs Church	Tårs	ca. 1200	57°23′3″N 10°6′58″E		
Uggerby Church	Uggerby	12th century	57°33′59.9″N 10°6′19.5″E		
Ugilt Church	Ugilt	ca. 1150	57°25′26″N 10°8′18″E		
Vejby Kirke	Vejby	12th century	57°22′38″N 9°52′37″E		
Vennebjerg Church	Vennebjerg	12th century	57°27′28″N 9°49′52″E		
Vidstrup Church	Vidstrup	ca. 1150	57°30′5″N 9°56′47″E		
Vittrup Church	Vittrup	1937	57°23′11″N 9°47′8″E		
Vrejlev Church	Vrå	1160	57°21′44″N 10°0′10″E		
Vrensted Church	Vrensted	12th century	57°20′11″N 9°46′22″E		
Vrå Church	Vrå	12th century	57°21′9.71″N 9°56′41.2″E		
Vrå Valgmenighedskirke (elective congregation)	Vrå	1900	57°21′21″N 9°56′14″E		

=== Other denominations ===
Name	Location	Denomination	Year	Coordinates	Image	Refs
Hjørring Baptist Church	Hjørring	Baptist World Alliance	1908	57°27′42″N 9°59′7″E		
Løkken Free Church	Løkken	Det Danske Missionsforbund	2004	57°22′14″N 9°42′56″E		
Sankt Maria, Martyrernes Dronning Church	Hjørring	Roman Catholic Church	1991	57°27′1″N 9°59′47″E		
