= Morten Middelfart =

American entrepreneur

- Born: October 2, 1970 (age 55); Hjørring, Denmark
- Education: Aalborg University (PhD.), Rushmore University (PhD.), Henley Management College (MBA)
- Occupations: Inventor, entrepreneur
- Known for: Cofounding Lumina Analytics and inventing the Radiance AI platform Developer of TARGIT Business Intelligence software
- Title: Chief Data Scientist/Co-founder of Lumina Analytics

Morten Middelfart (born October 2, 1970) is an American serial entrepreneur, inventor, and technologist. He is known for inventing the Lumina Analytics Radiance AI platform, as well as the TARGIT software for business intelligence and analytics. Middelfart is currently the founder/Chief Data Scientist of Lumina Analytics, Advisory CIO of Genomic Expression and founder of Social Quant. Middelfart holds seven U.S. patents for his work in business intelligence and analytics software.

== Education and academic path ==
Middelfart holds a PhD from Aalborg University, a PhD from Rushmore University, and an MBA from Henley Management College. His research concentrates on "human-computer synergy", Big Data, and how computing power and human interaction can be used to make faster, more effective decisions in general.

Middelfart is the author of two books as a function of this research, namely: CALM: Computer Aided Leadership & Management and Sentinel Mining. In addition, he is the co-author of the books: Enabling Real-Time Business Intelligence and Business Intelligence.

Middelfart's work has been cited in work dedicated to exploring knowledge base inspection. He has also published several peer-reviewed articles that outline his philosophy and technological developments in detail.

Middelfart has been guest lecturer at Information Technologies for Business Intelligence Doctoral College, Third European Business Intelligence Summer School, and Alborg University.

== Early entrepreneurship ==
Middelfart founded an analytics company, Morton Systems, in 1996, and became CTO of TARGIT following TARGIT's acquisition of his business in 1997. After the acquisition, TARGIT transitioned from reselling enterprise software systems to developing and selling business intelligence and analytics software. In 2014, Middelfart left TARGIT and founded Social Quant, a social media optimization service. In 2015, Middelfart joined Genomic Expressions, which uses data analytics to offer treatment ideas for cancer patients.

Middelfart has been a supporter of entrepreneurship in the movie industry by joining the board of Folio.

== Lumina Analytics and Radiance ==
In 2015 Middelfart cofounded Lumina Analytics, which uses artificial intelligence and machine learning technologies to uncover corporate risk by sifting through massive amounts of information. Lumina's Radiance platform is a disruptive search technology that automates internet searches to identify risks and threats through initial vetting and continuous monitoring of employee or customer behavior.

In 2020, Lumina was recognized by Goldman Sachs as one of the top 100 Most Intriguing Entrepreneurs in the World. During the global COVID-19 pandemic, Lumina assisted by directing its Radiance platform to help identify future hot-spots of the virus.

In March 2021 Middelfart and Lumina were featured in a Forbes article addressing the global digital revolution and various countries' roles within that transformation. Middelfart discussed the vision of Lumina and the need to have the "end game" in mind from the beginning.

== Patents and inventions ==
Middelfart holds seven U.S. patents His inventions pertain primarily to graphical representation of OLAP-structured of data within a business intelligence and analytics platform, methods of retrieving data from the platform, and the processing of natural language and multi-lingual queries to the data warehouse through the platform.

Middelfart has one patent application pending with the U.S. Patent and Trademark Office, focused on the intelligent processing of user queries in natural language into a business intelligence platform.

In addition to his patents, Middelfart's work incorporates the OODA loop process within business intelligence and data warehousing. The concept, as first developed by USAF Colonel John Boyd, describes the way individuals and organizations gather information, decide on a course of action based on that information, and carry out the decision.
