= Sønderby railway halt =

Former railway halt in North Jutland, Denmark

Sønderby
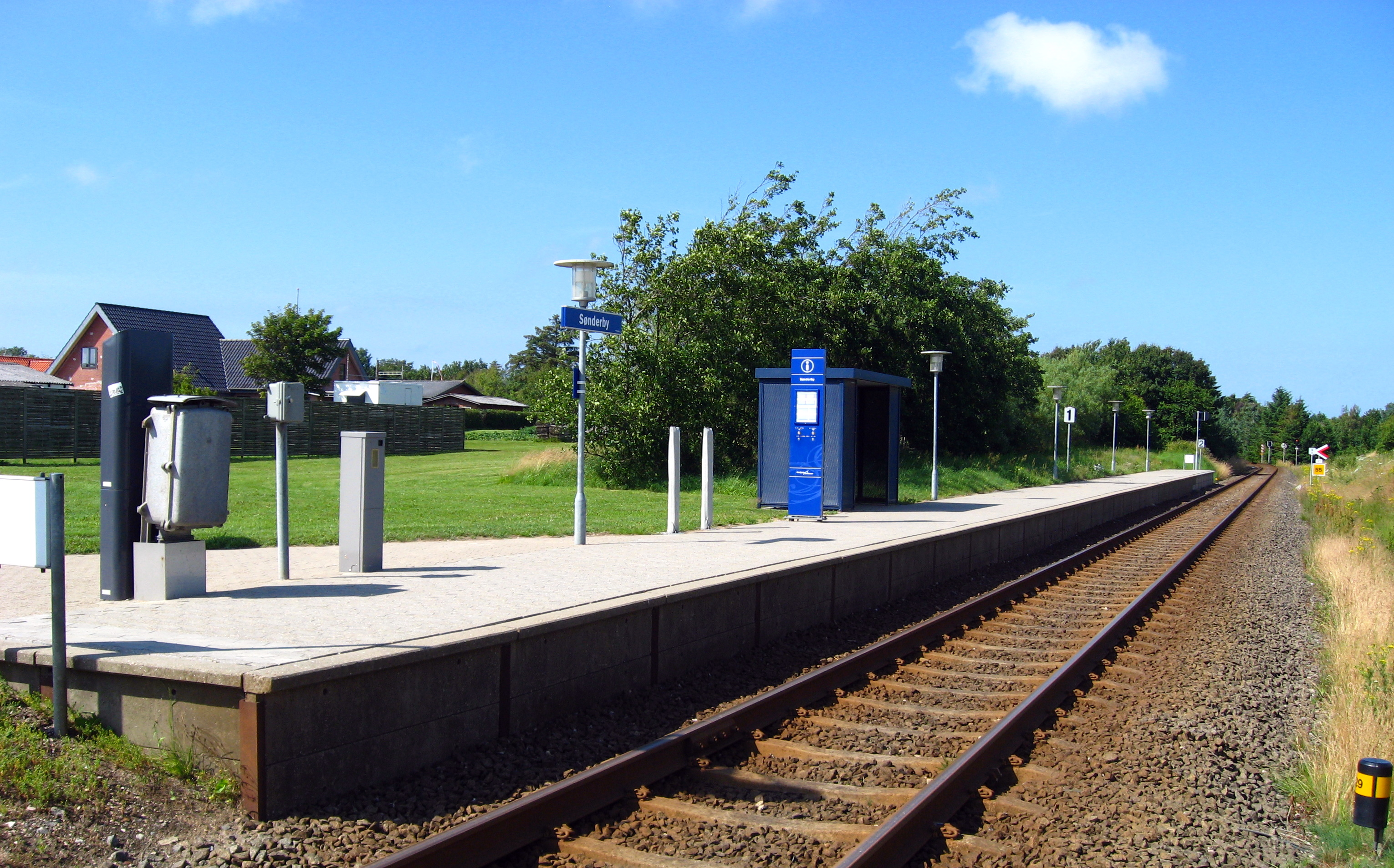
- Sønderby halt in 2011

General information
- Location: Bjergbyvej 3 Tornby; 9850 Hirtshals; Denmark
- Coordinates: 57°31′31″N 9°57′04″E
- System: Railway halt
- Line: Hirtshals Line
- Platforms: 1
- Tracks: 1

History
- Opened: 1928
- Closed: 2019
Location
- Location within Denmark

Sønderby railway halt (Danish: Sønderby Trinbræt) is a former railway halt serving the southern part of the village of Tornby in Vendsyssel, Denmark. The halt was located on the Hirtshals Line between Hirtshals and Hjørring.

== History ==
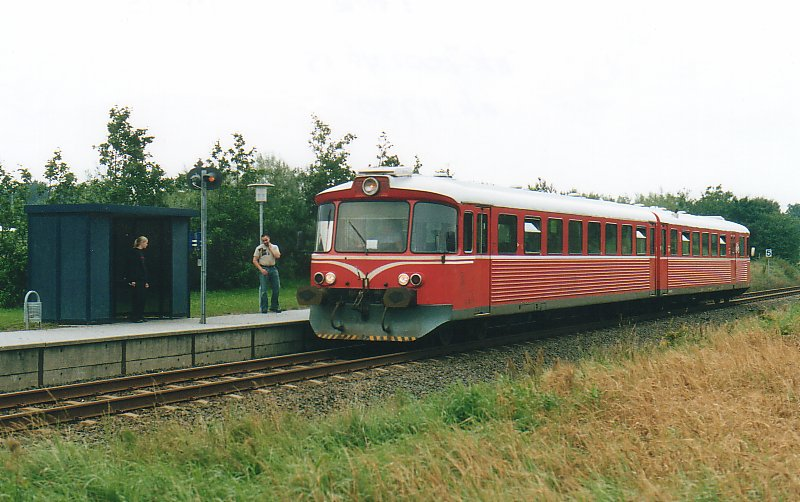
Sønderby halt in 2002

The halt was opened in 1928, three years after the railway line opened. It was closed in 2019.
