= VHM (disambiguation) =

VHM may refer to:

- Vendsyssel Historical Museum, a regional museum
- Virginia Holocaust Museum, a public history museum
- Vilhelmina Airport, the IATA code VHM
- Vinhomes, the HOSE code VHM
