= Berit Hjelholt =

Finnish-Danish textile artist

- Born: Berit Ann-Mari Eriksson; 21 September 1920; Munsala, Finland
- Died: 30 July 2016 (aged 95); Fjerritslev, Denmark
- Education: Konstindustriella Läroverket Atheneum
- Known for: Textile art
- Spouse: Gunnar Hjelholt (m. 1949)
- Children: 2

Berit Ann-Mari Hjelholt née Eriksson (1920–2016) was a Finnish-born Danish textile artist. For many years, her large tapestry "Som en rejselysten flåde" (1987) hung behind the speaker's chair in the Folketing or Danish parliament. It was relocated in 2016 to Vendsyssel Kunstmuseum.

== Biography ==
Born on 21 September 1920 in Munsala, Finland, Berit Ann-Mari Eriksson was the daughter of the fisherman and farmer Otto Alfred Eriksson (1882-1965) and Edit Maria Sundell (1888-1959). One of seven children, she was brought up in a modest but tightly-knit Swedish-speaking family where the girls were taught to spin. Her father was often away, travelling as far afield as New Zealand as a craftsman, but always entertaining the family with stories of his adventures on his return. From 1939, she attended the Konstindustriella Läroverket Atheneum in Helsinki, an arts and crafts college, where she learnt textile arts, graduating in 1947.

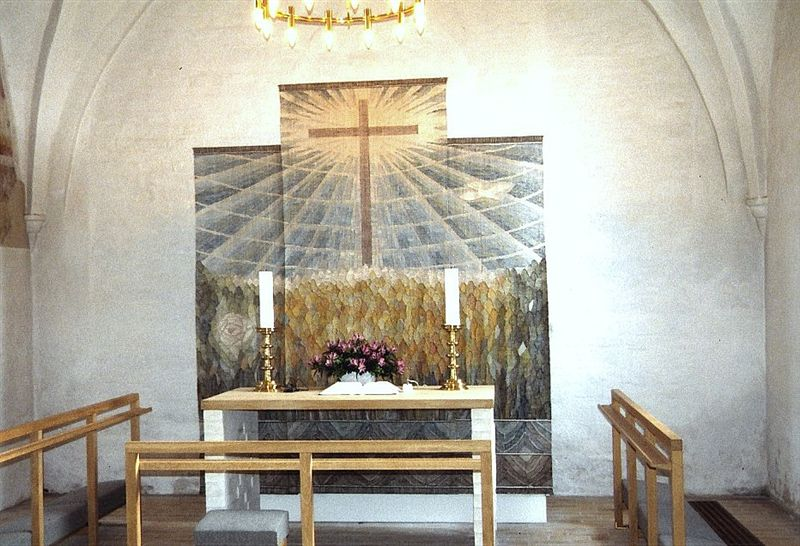
Gundsømagle Church decorated by Berit Hjelholt

In 1946, while on a course at the Konstfack in Stockholm, she met the Danish psychologist and resistance fighter Gunnar Hjelholt who was recovering from imprisonment in a German concentration camp. They married in 1949 and moved to Denmark where they settled in Bagsværd. After giving birth to two children, Hjelholt taught evening classes in textile printing and ceramics. She also started to weave. As a result of her husband's work as a consultant psychologist for the shipping company J. Lauritzen A/S, she accompanied him to India, Thailand, Hawaii, Japan and the United States. On returning to Denmark, she studied Japanese and calligraphy at the University of Copenhagen (1964–67). In 1969, the family moved to the north of Jutland. Inspired by the surrounding countryside, she created colourful textiles in the old farmhouse they had bought.

In 1987, she was invited to decorate the Folketing's parliamentary chamber with a two-piece tapestry titled "Som en rejselysten flåde" (As an adventurous fleet), inspired by her childhood memories of her father's travels to distant lands. A combination of the moving sea and distant mountains conveyed a spirit of ambition in a work which demonstrated her mastery of the art of tapestry. The tapestry remained in the chamber until 2016 when it was moved to the Vendsyssel Kunstmuseum.

Hjelholt has also decorated a number of Danish churches, with works such as Livets træ (Tree of Life) in Ellebæk Church in Holstebro (1989) and Denne er Dagen (This is the Day) for Østervang Church in Glostrup (1994). Her work has been exhibited in several solo exhibitions in Denmark and Sweden, in particular in 1990 at the Vendsyssel Kunstmuseum in Hjørring.

Berit Hjelholt died on 30 July 2016 in Fjerritslev and is buried in Jammerbugt in the north of Jutland.
