= Saint Olaf's Church, Hjørring =

Saint Olaf's Church
- Sankt Olai Kirke
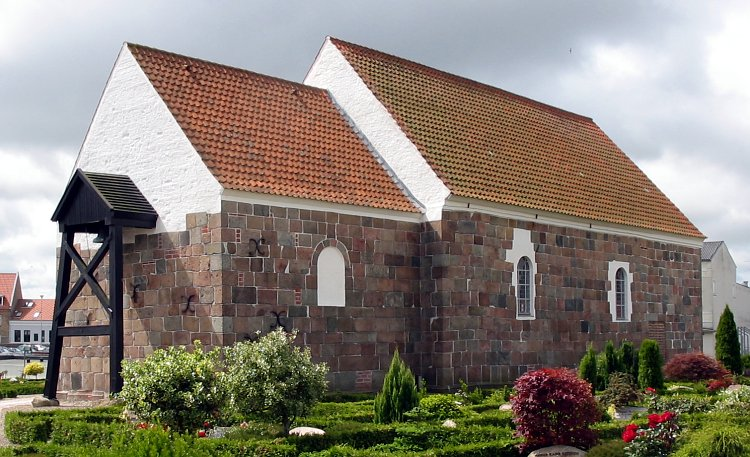
- Saint Olaf's Church
- 57°27′41″N 9°59′7″E
- Location: Hjørring,
- Country: Denmark
- Denomination: Church of Denmark
- Previous denomination: Catholic
- Churchmanship: Evangelical Lutheran
- Website: www.sctolai-hjoerring.dk/

History
- Status: Parish church
- Consecrated: 12th century

Architecture
- Functional status: Active
- Style: Romanesque

Specifications
- Materials: Stone

Administration
- Diocese: Diocese of Aalborg

Saint Olaf's Church (Danish: Sankt Olai Kirke) is a church in Hjørring, Denmark. This small church from about 1200, dedicated to Saint Olaf and built in Romanesque style, is located on a hill in Hjørring's old town center.

The altarpiece has framework in Renaissance style, and is probably made by Niels Ibsen, with paintings from the 18th century and "Christ and Nicodemus" from around 1910 by A. Hou.

The Renaissance pulpit was added in 1604 by Niels Ibsen. The new baptismal font is made of sandstone. The older font is now at the Vendsyssel Historical Museum. The church organ with 17 voices is from 1972.
