= Vidstrup =

Village in Vendsyssel, Denmark

- Village
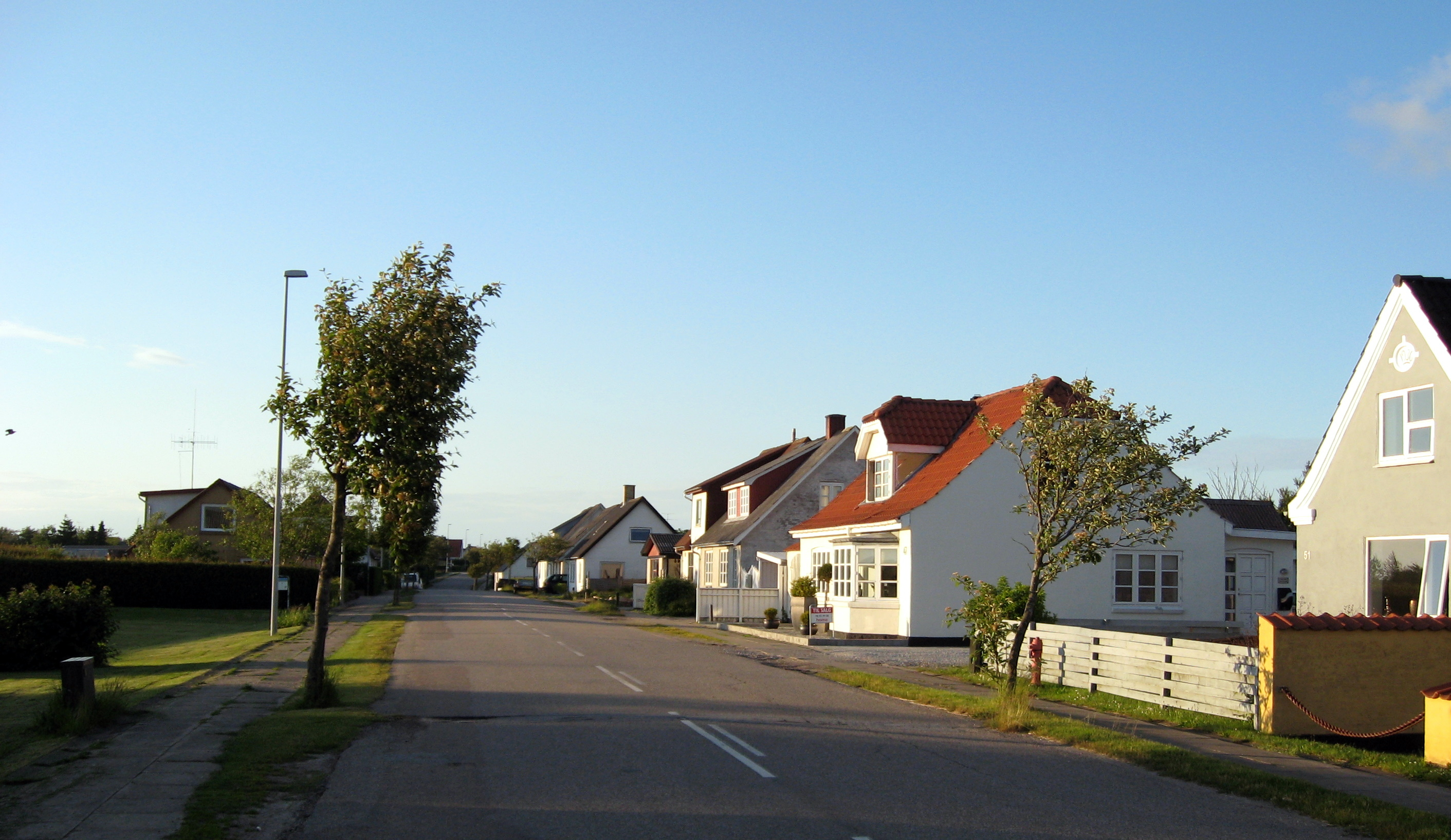
- Vidstrup

- Location in Denmark Vidstrup (North Jutland Region)
- Coordinates: 57°30′04″N 9°56′44″E
- Country: Denmark
- Region: North Jutland Region
- Municipality: Hjørring Municipality

Population (2019)
  - Urban: 203
- Time zone: UTC+1 (CET)
  - Summer (DST): UTC+2 (CEST)
- Postal code: DK-9800 Hjørring

Vidstrup is a village in Hjørring Municipality in North Jutland Region, Denmark. As of 1 January 2019, it has a population of 203 inhabitants. It is located in the north-western part of the Vendsyssel district about 5 km (3.1 mi) north of the town of Hjørring.

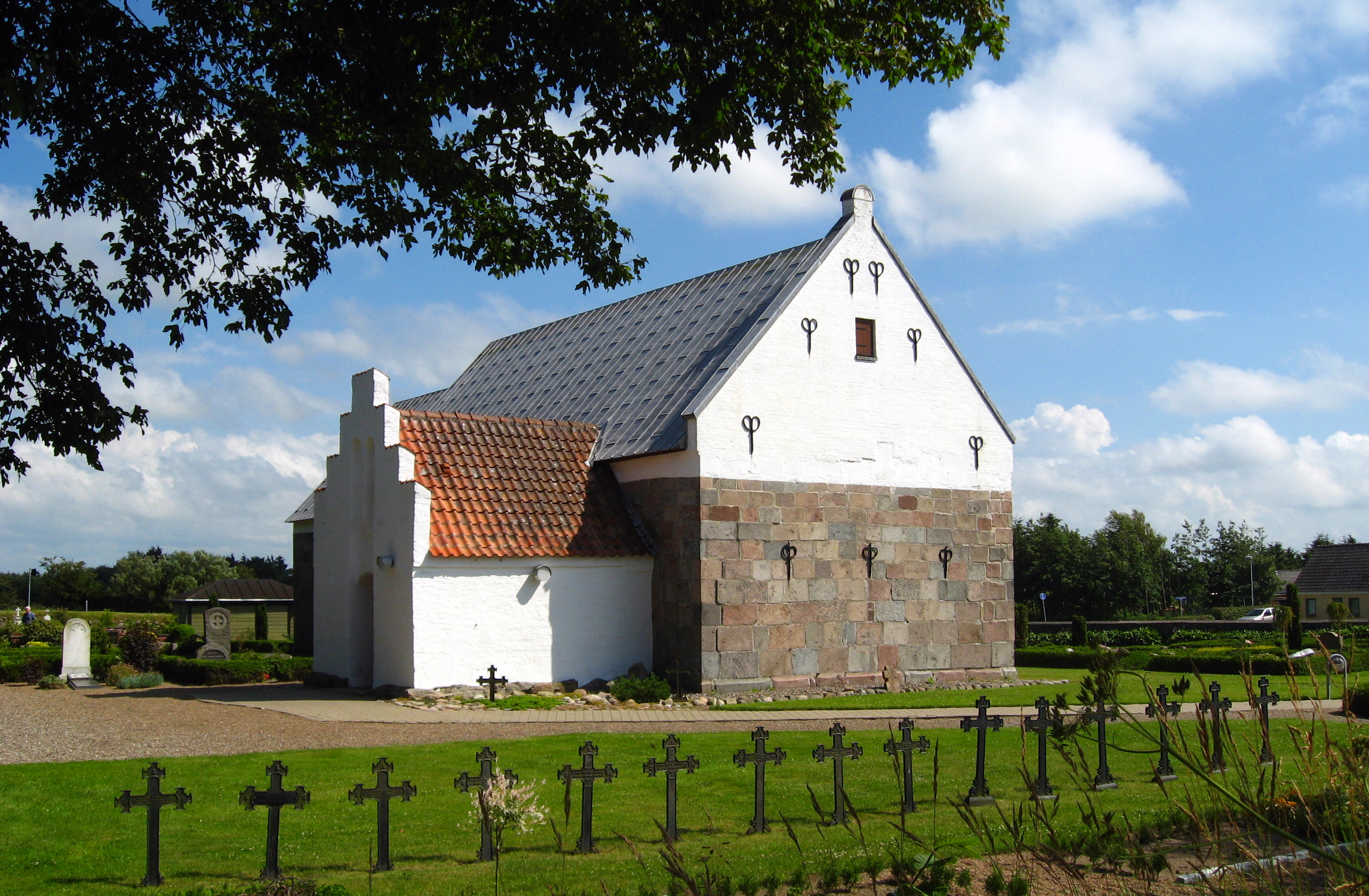
Vidstrup Church

Vidstrup Church is located in the centre of the village.

The village is served by Vidstrup railway station, located on the railway line between Hirtshals and Hjørring.

== Gallery ==
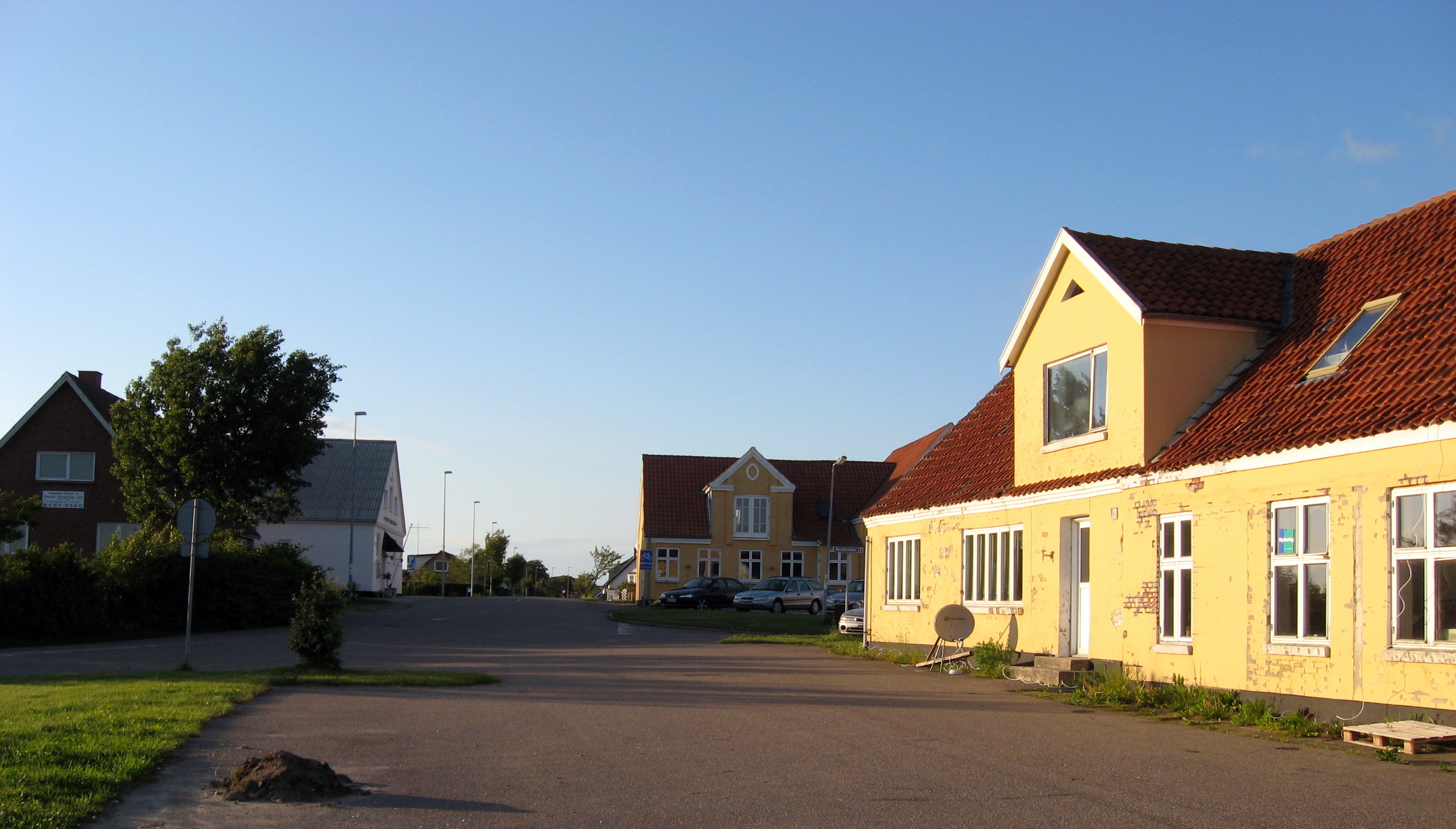
Vidstrup village

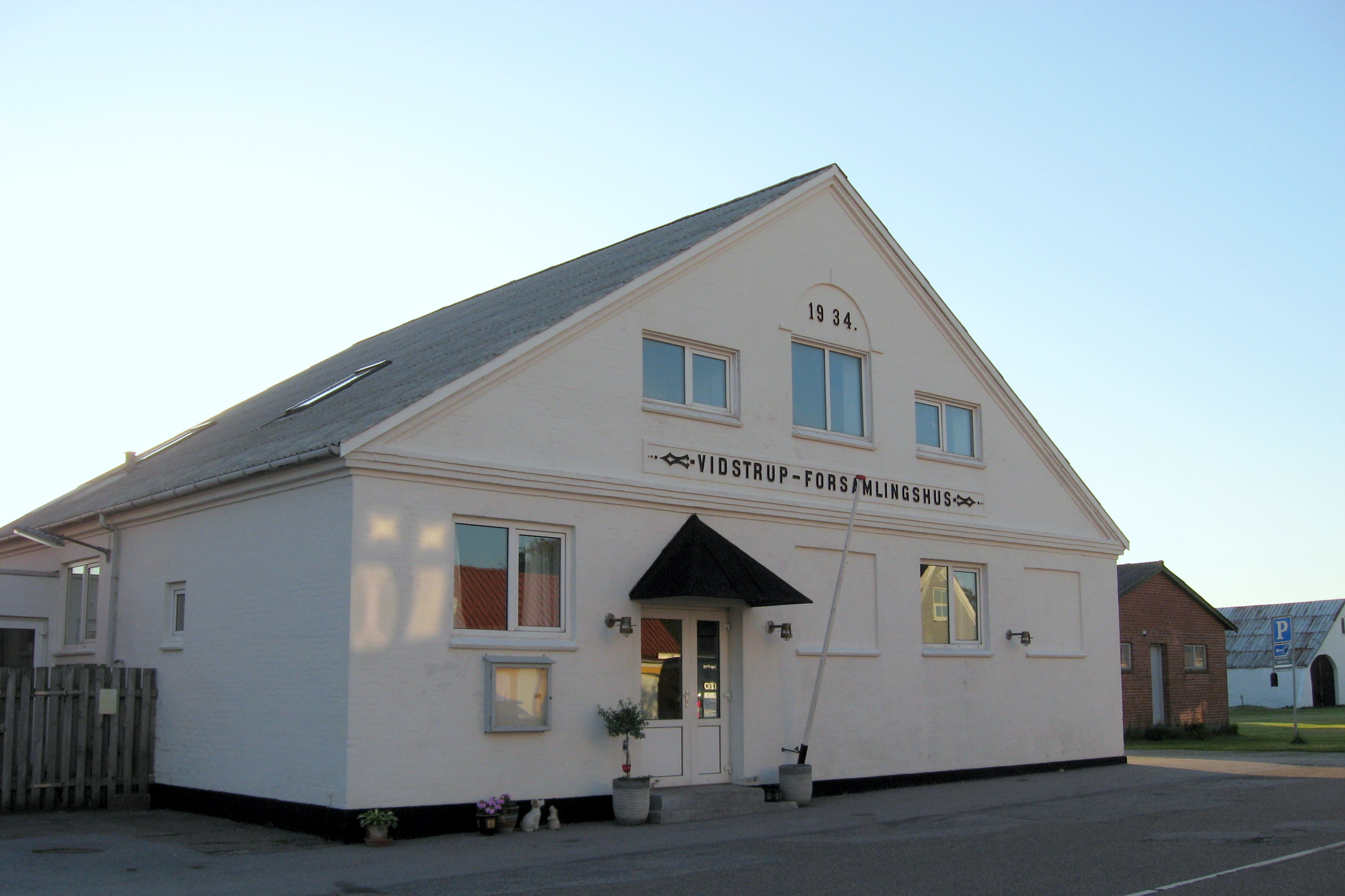
Vidstrup Assembly House

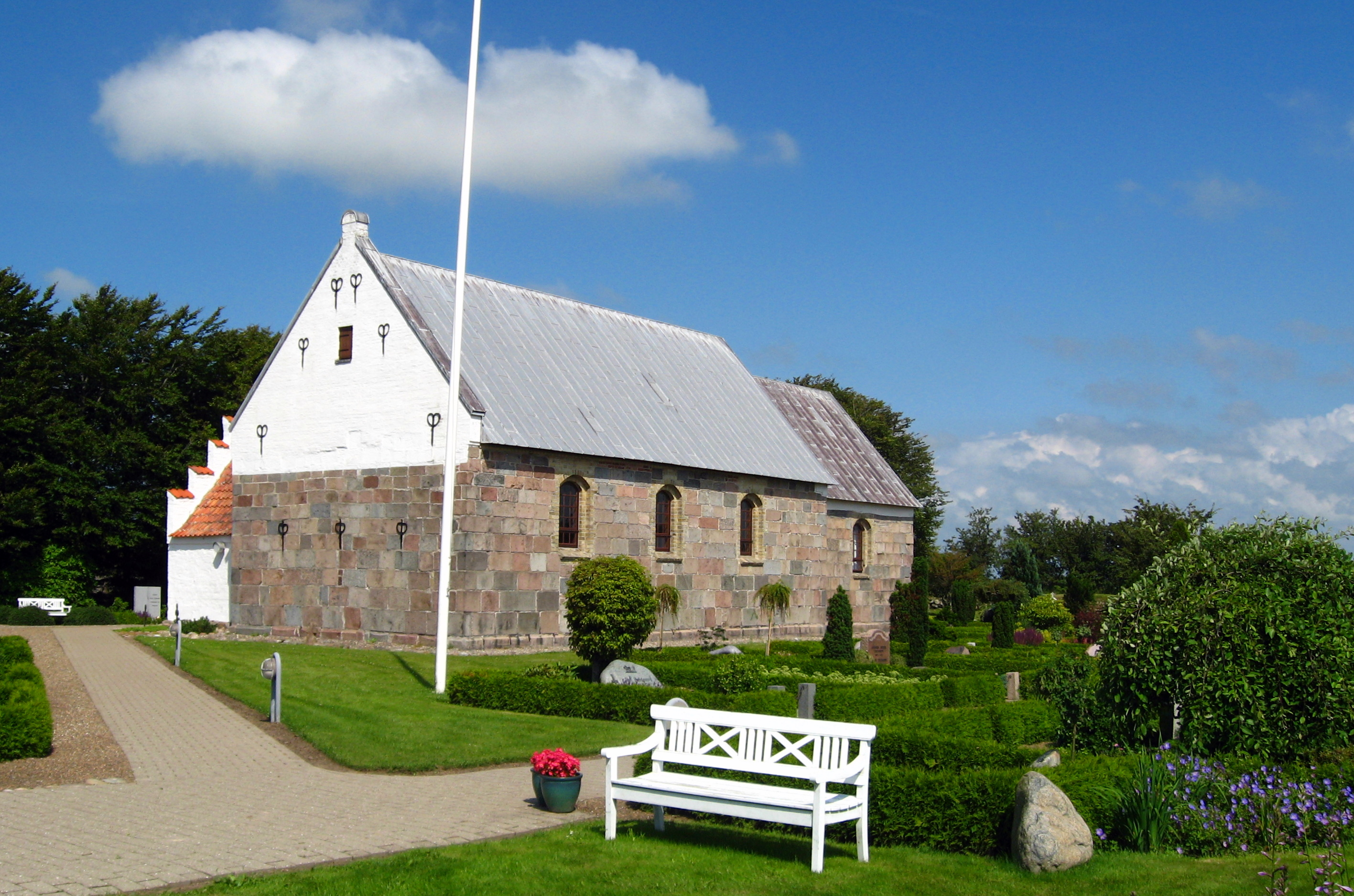
Vidstrup Church

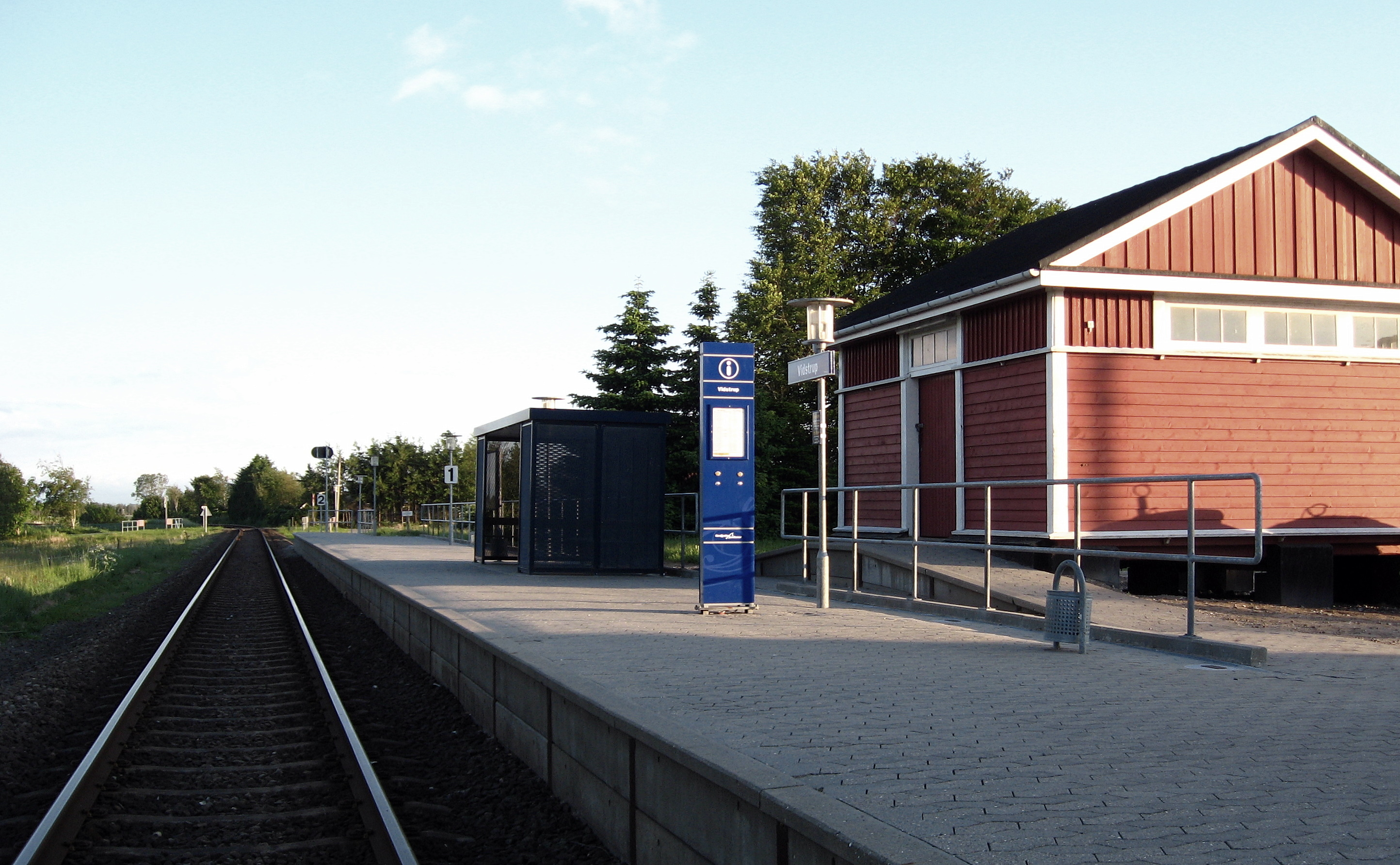
Vidstrup railway station
