= Tornby, Denmark =

Village in Vendsyssel, Denmark

Tornby
- Town
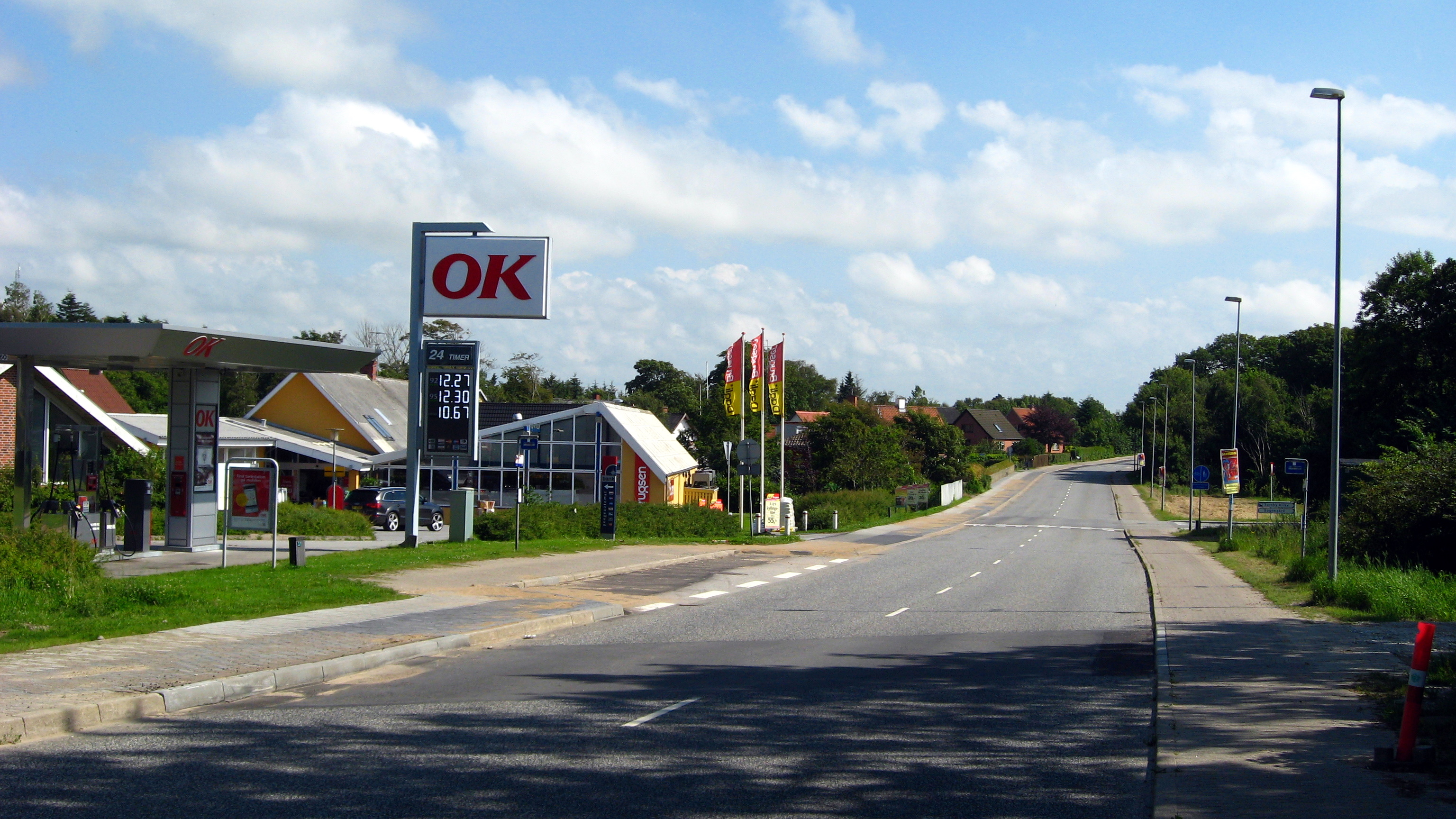
- Tornby

- Location in North Jutland Region Tornby (Denmark)
- Coordinates: 57°31′41″N 9°56′57″E
- Country: Denmark
- Region: North Jutland Region
- Municipality: Hjørring Municipality

Area
  - Urban: 1 km^{2} (0.39 sq mi)

Population (2026)
  - Urban: 1,001
  - Urban density: 1,000/km^{2} (2,600/sq mi)
- Time zone: UTC+1 (CET)
  - Summer (DST): UTC+2 (CEST)
- Postal code: DK-9850 Hirtshals

Tornby is a small railway town in Hjørring Municipality in North Jutland Region, Denmark. As of 1 January 2026, it has the population of 1,001. It is located in the north-western part of the Vendsyssel district between the towns of Hjørring and Hirtshals.

Tornby Church is located in the western part of the town.

The town is served by Tornby railway station, located on the railway line between Hirtshals and Hjørring. The southern part of the village was served by the railway halt Sønderby until 2019.

== Gallery ==
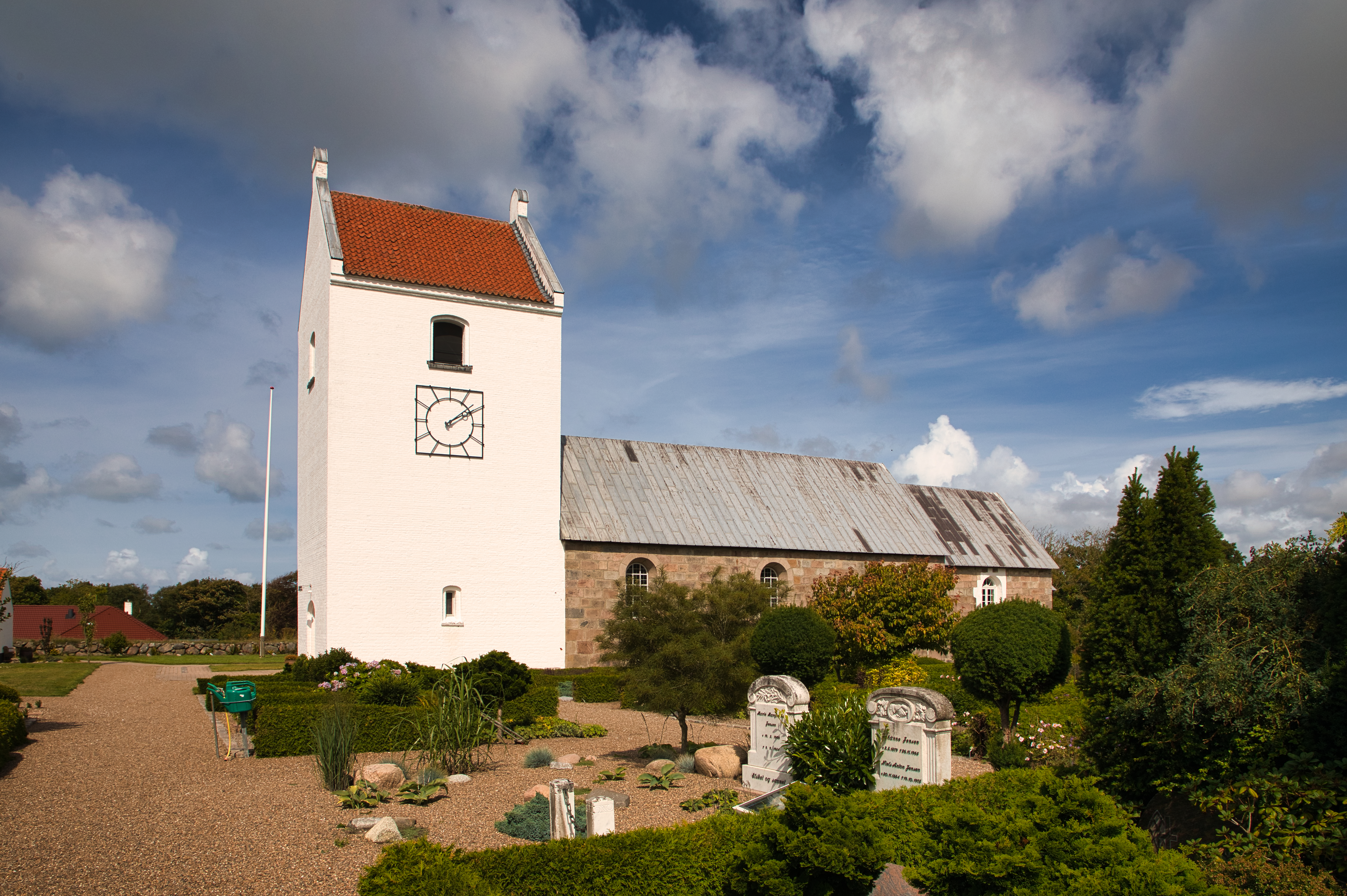
Tornby Church

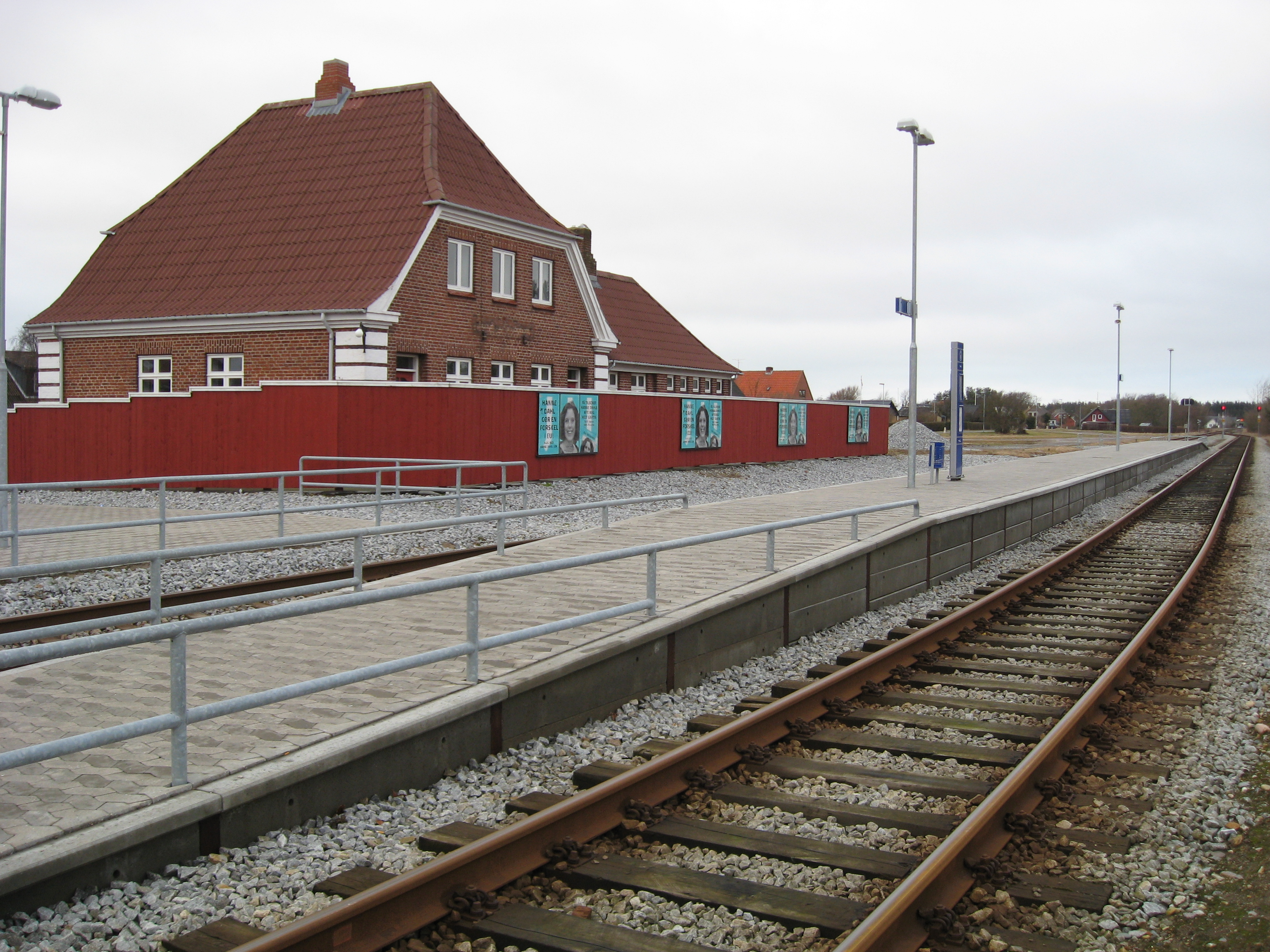
Tornby railway station

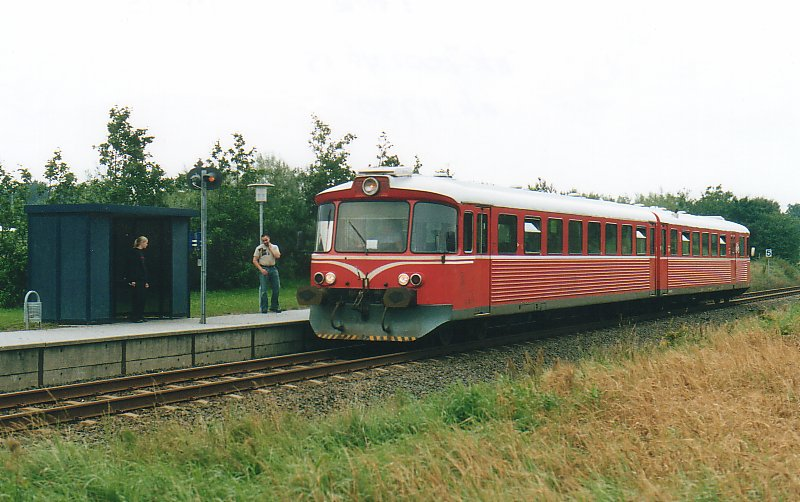
Sønderby railway halt in 2002

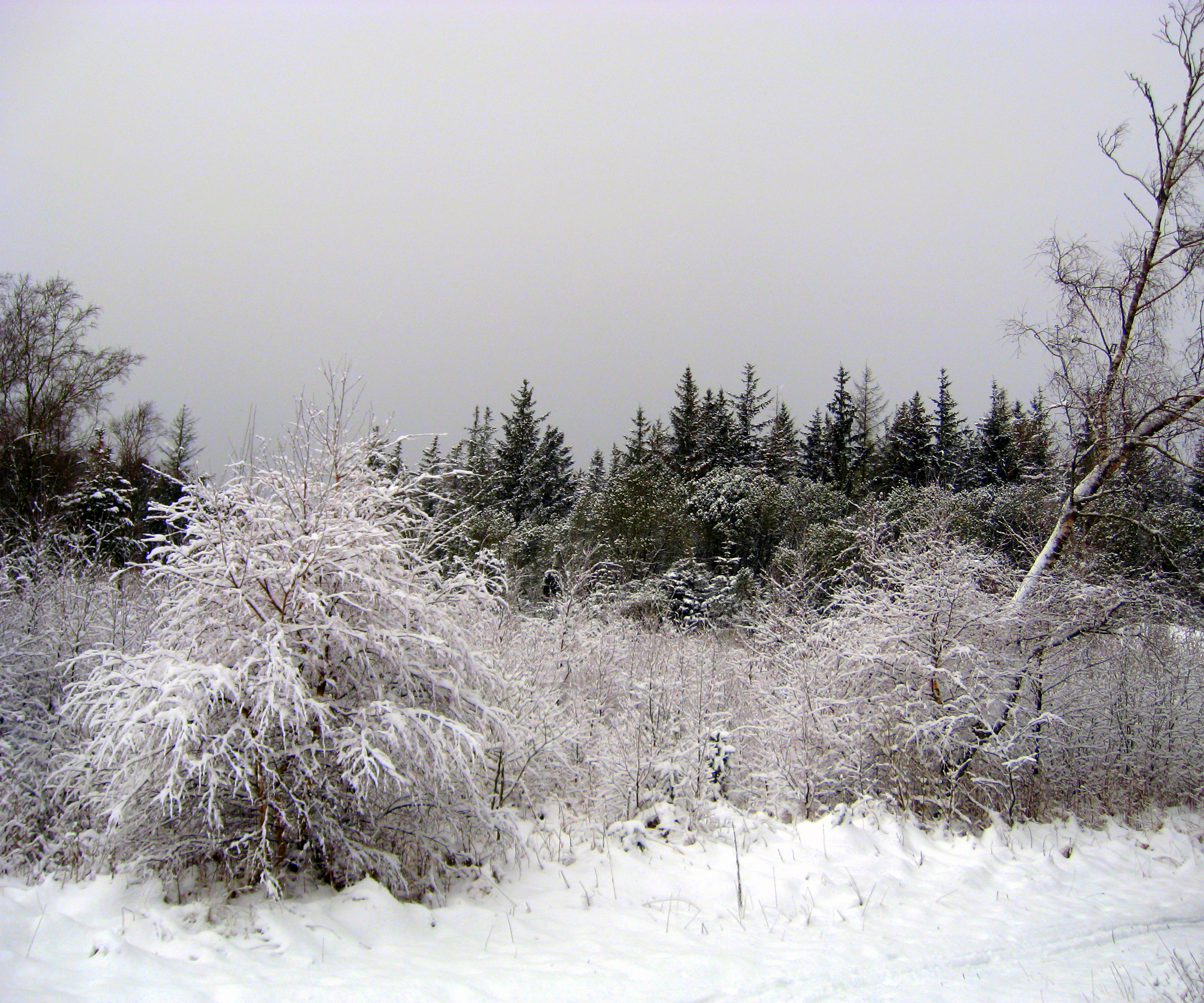
Winter in Tornby Plantation
