= Kasper Bai =

Danish musician

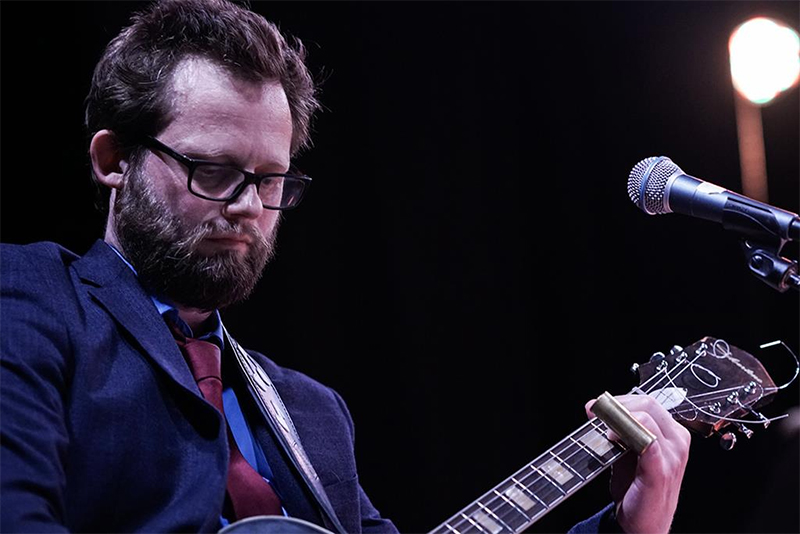
Kasper Bai jazz guitarist and composer

Kasper Bai (born 1974) is a Danish songwriter, composer, arranger and guitarist. He was born in Hjørring, studied at the Royal Academy of Music in Aarhus, and now lives and works in Copenhagen. He is known for his Jazz/Classical crossover orchestral pieces and his modern use of the Danish "Vise" form. His ensembles include the Kasper Bai Orchestet, the Kasper Bai Kvartet and Cordelia.
