= Vendsyssel Kunstmuseum =

Coordinates: 57.46098°N 9.9872°E

Vendsyssel Art Museum
- Type: Art museum
- Website: www.vkm.dk

Vendsyssel Kunstmuseum, formerly Hjørring Kunstmuseum, is a state-subsidised art museum in Hjørring, which was founded in 1963 and has a collection of 19th and 20th century art mostly from North Denmark.

The museum's collection contains works by the painters Svend Engelund (1908–2007), Johannes Hofmeister (1914–90), Poul Winther (1939–2018) and Poul Anker Bech ( 1942–2009). In addition to major works by the mentioned artists, the museum's collections includes works by Agnete Bjerre (b. 1924), Anna Maria Lütken (1916–2001), Poul Ekelund (1921–76 ), Arne L. Hansen (1921–2009), Søren Elgaard (b.1951), Emil Gregersen (1921–93), Frede Christoffersen (1919–87 ) et al.

The museum was founded in 1963. In 1970, the museum took over the premises of Hjørring Central Library. The library's reading room was decorated with six large frescoes with motifs from the history of the Vendel residents made by the painter Niels Larsen Stevns. Since 2003, the museum has been housed in a former textile factory, which is centrally located in Hjørring on[P. Nørkjærs Plads. The old industrial building was transformed by architect Anna Maria Indrio from C.F. Møllers Tegnestue. In 2009, the museum was expanded with a new underground gallery also designed by Indrio, used for permanent hangings of works by Niels Larsen Stevns.

The museum received state recognition in 1981 and changed its to Vendsyssel Kunstmuseum in 2000.
