= Rushmore University =

Unaccredited institute of higher learning on the Cayman Islands

Rushmore University is an unaccredited institution of higher learning offering online degrees in a variety of business-related fields, exclusively via distance learning. It has been described as a diploma mill, providing illegitimate academic degrees and diplomas for a fee.

== History ==
Rushmore was started in 1996 in South Dakota by Michael Cox (professor) (1952–2006), whose credentials included a PhD in accounting from Oklahoma State University and seven years' teaching at the University of Arkansas and Sam Houston State University.

As of June 4, 2006 Rushmore had a mailing address in the Cayman Islands. The Maine Department of Education formerly listed it as having been located in South Dakota and the Cayman Islands. As of August 2012, both the Maine Department of Education and Oregon Office of Degree Authorization identify Rushmore as operating in the Cayman Islands and the U.S. state of Georgia.

== Approach ==
Rushmore offers all of its educational programs solely through distance education. It has no physical campus and has had various mailing addresses, from Wyoming to the Cayman Islands. It currently has a mailing address in South Dakota. Rushmore states that each student can design their own entire curriculum.

Students are encouraged to publish their student papers on the Internet, in conventional journals or magazines, or as self-published books. Editors are employed by the institution to help improve students' written work. Rushmore promotional materials state that the "status as an author" that results from these publications gives its alumni "greater recognition and credibility than [their] competitors".

== Lack of accreditation ==
Formerly Rushmore's promotional material claimed that the conventionally recognized system of educational accreditation in the United States is irrelevant and that Rushmore had instead attained "independent accreditation," as measured solely by the success of its graduates. In the past, Rushmore claimed approval from a variety of agencies, none of them recognized by the United States Department of Education (USDE) or the Council for Higher Education Accreditation (CHEA). The Oregon State Office of Degree Authorization has no evidence that this is an accredited or otherwise acceptable provider of postsecondary education meeting Oregon standards. Oregon employers should consider degrees from this supplier to be substandard unless each degree program is evaluated in detail by an external evaluator acceptable to ODA. The Maine Department of Education and State of Michigan also list Rushmore as non-accredited. The Texas Higher Education Coordinating Board also listed Rushmore University as a "fraudulent/substandard institution" as of 18 April 2018. The State of Michigan has listed Rushmore as an unacceptable institution for credentialing for those seeking jobs in the state's Department of Civil Service.

In August 2009, Rushmore announced that it was seeking association with the Chartered Management Institute (CMI). This was announced in the August 2009 Rushmore newsletter. The Rushmore June 2012 newsletter reported that in April 2012 Rushmore had obtained CMI Recognised Center status, including approval for several Rushmore programs, though the CMI is not an accrediting organisation.

In Denmark, work done through Rushmore is not acknowledged as PhD work, hence the Danish national state radio channel recently had to retract claims made by a Rushmore graduate presented as having an accredited PhD degree.

== See also ==
- List of unaccredited institutions of higher learning
- List of unrecognized accreditation associations of higher learning
- School accreditation
