= Hjørring Baptist Church =

Church in Hjørring Municipality, Denmark

Coordinates: 57°27′41″N 9°59′07″E

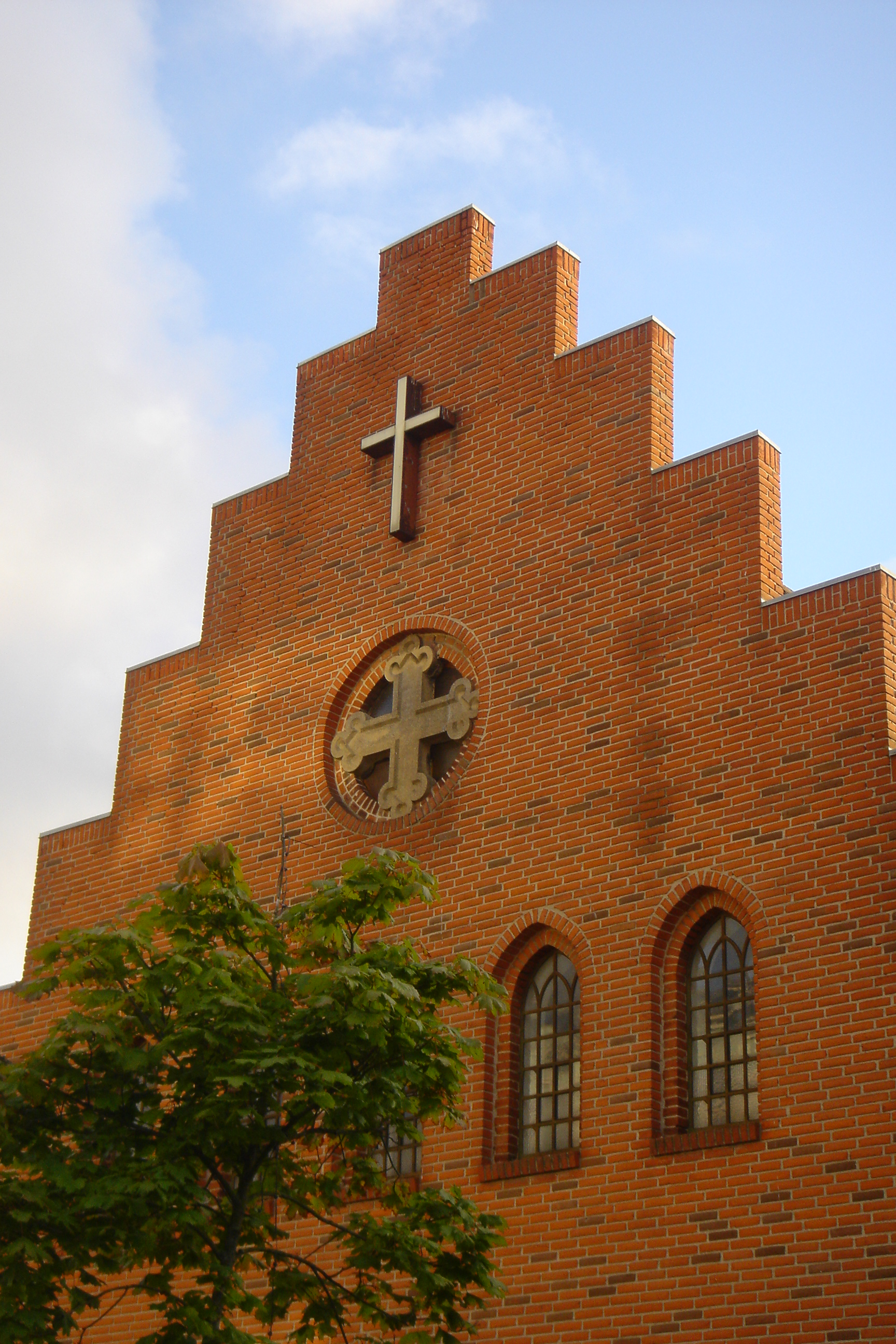
Hjørring Baptistkirke

Hjørring Baptist Church is a Christian Baptist Church, which is located on Sct. Olai Plads in the center of Hjørring, Denmark.

The church is a part of the Baptist World Alliance.

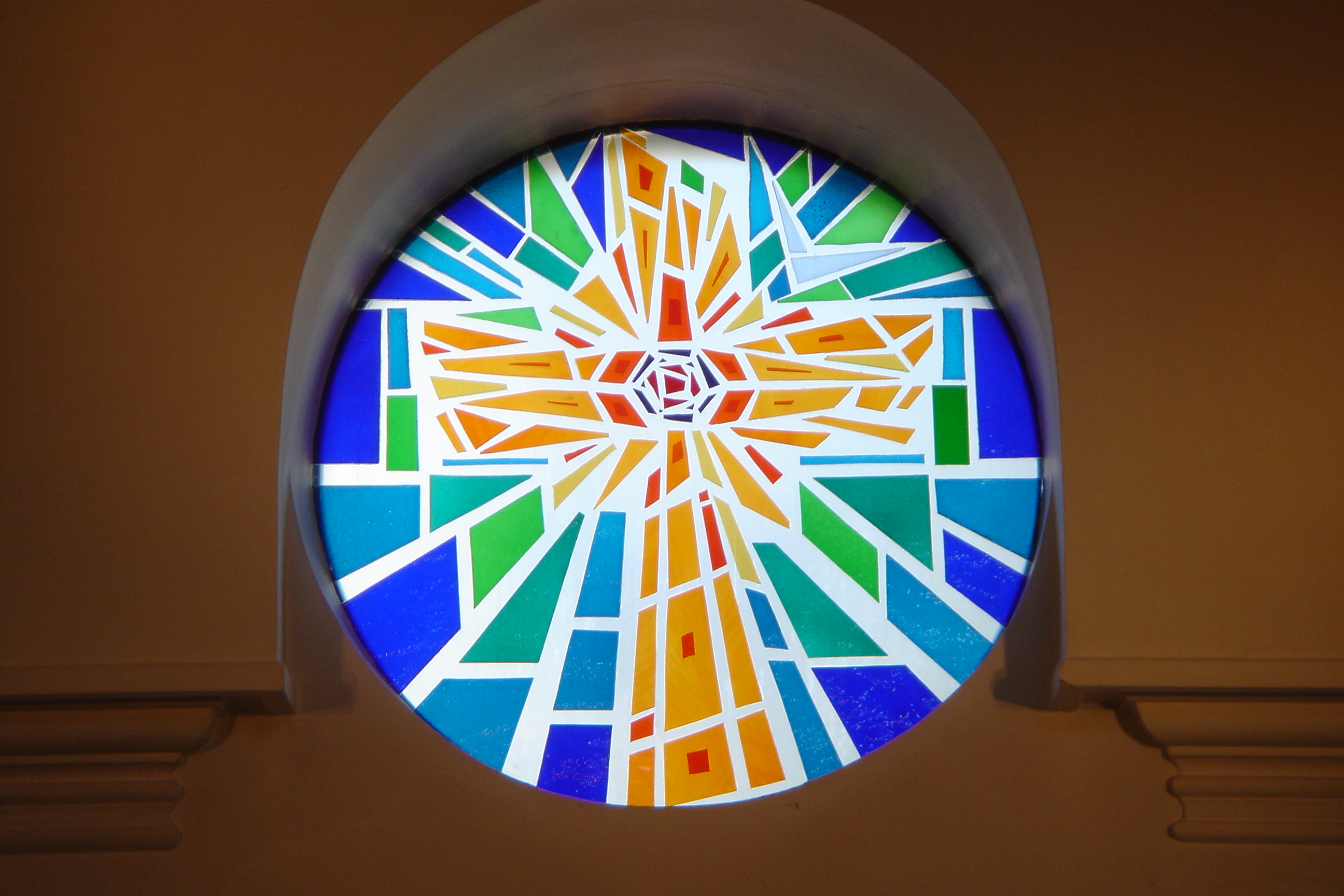
Mosaikrude i Hjørring Baptistkirke
