= Poul Anker Bech =

Danish painter

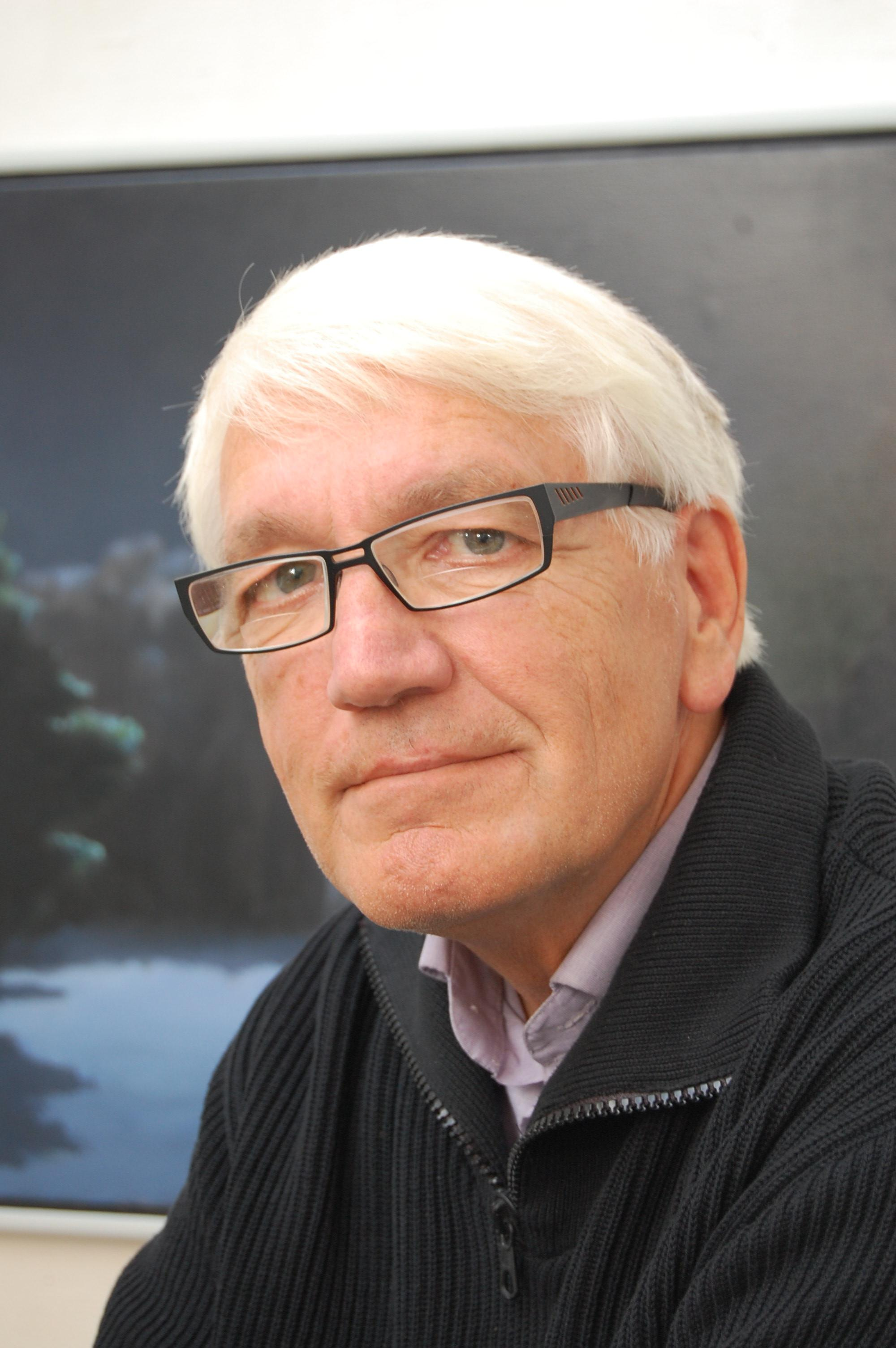
Poul Anker Bech

Poul Anker Bech (13 April 1942 – 7 October 2009) was a Danish painter.

He started painting in the 1960s and studied at The Jutland Academy of Art in Aarhus, 1966–67. He quit his job in 1988 to become a full-time painter.

Poul Anker Bech painted everyday landscapes and situations, from an unusual point of view. His motives often contain ironic or surrealistic elements.

He himself has said that he would like his paintings to easily be remembered, without needing to understand their meaning.

On 27 August 2003 a Danish 19-krone stamp was published using one of Poul Anker Bech's paintings, Det forjættede land (the promised land). He was the recipient of a lifetime stipendium from the Danish government's Art Fund, as well as several prizes.

Poul Anker Bech was a member of the Corner artist group. He is featured in the collections of several Danish art museums including Randers Kunstmuseum and Vendsyssel Kunstmuseum.
