= Vendsyssel Historical Museum =

Coordinates: 57°27.65′N 9°58.98′E

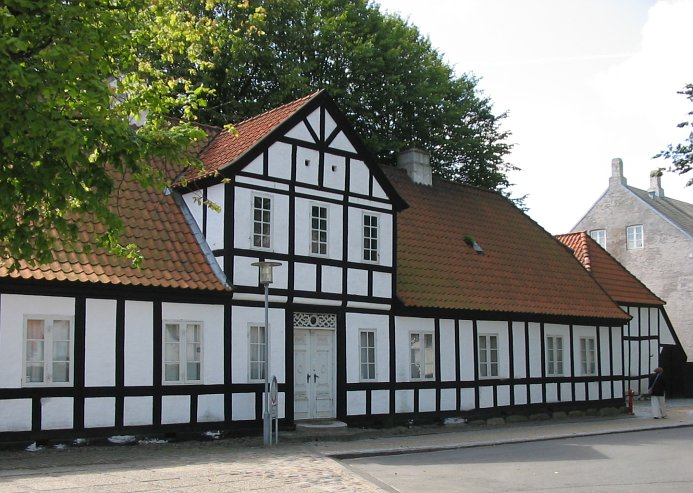
Vendsyssel Historical Museum headquarters in Hjørring. The old timber-framed house originally served as residence of the local rural dean from 1773-74.

Vendsyssel Historical Museum (VHM) is a regional museum, preserving and exhibiting the history of the region of Vendsyssel in Denmark.

The museum works as an umbrella organization for a total of five departments and six exhibitions in Vendsyssel. It was initiated in 1889 and attained recognition by the State of Denmark in 1959.

== Exhibits ==
The VHM has extensive collections on the natural history of the region and also conducts and archives archaeological excavations. Some of the excavated items originated as early as 10,000 BC.

The museum exhibits in Hjørring, two places in Hirtshals, in Mosbjerg and at Rubjerg Knude:

- Hjørring: This is the site of the headquarters of VHM, taking residence in several buildings both old and new, all encompassing a small enclosed park with herb gardens, a playground and facilities for picnics. The exhibits presents artifacts and tells stories from the earliest Nordic Stone Age to modern times, rooted in finds from the region of Vendsyssel. The museum and its collections was initiated by the first dentist in Hjørring J. J. Lønborg Friis and his old preserved clinic can also be studied here. There is a museum shop and a café at the complex.
- Hirtshals Museum: Situated in an old fisherman's house from 1880, this museum exhibits and tells the story of Hirtshals and its strong relations to the North Sea through the ages. The interior of the house is reconstructed to show how ordinary fishermen's families lived anno 1915 in this region. The museum also tells the story of the 'Bjesk', the old traditional bitter of Vendsyssel and gives information and assistance on how to use the many local herbs found in the dunes along the west coast, for producing one's own 'Bjesk'. Bitters are an old and widespread tradition in Scandinavia, and is generally referred to as snaps in Denmark.
- Bunker Museum Hirtshals: The shorelines around the city of Hirtshals was part of the German Atlantic Wall defence during World War II. The museum presents the only excavated complete WWII bunker system in Denmark and holds 54 bunkers and many artillery nests between radar and lighting facilities spread out over a 3.5 km long strip of shoreline.
- Mosbjerg: The department in Mosbjerg 20–30 km east of Hjørring, is a landscape- and agricultural museum (see ecomuseum) placed in a hilly and geologically interesting landscape. The museum is a working museum, imitating the agricultural practises in the early part of the 1900s and is based in two separate farm buildings. There are three designed hiking paths in the area associated with the museum; "Oldtidsstien", "Markstien" and "Skovstien", which translates as The Prehistoric Path, The Field Path and The Forest Path. The trails are focusing on prehistoric tumuli, various agricultural landuses and a characteristic forest meadow habitat respectively. The long-distance hiking trail of Hærvejen passes through the area in the east.
- Rubjerg Knude: The old coastal farm of Strandfogedgården ("The Wreck Master's Farm") a few kilometres south of the decommissioned lighthouse of Rubjerg, has been administered by the VHM since 2000. As the name implies, it was formerly the home of the wreck master at Rubjerg Knude, going back to 1860s. The relentless winds, drifting sands and migrating dunes, hints at the rather harsh living conditions here in former ages. VHM has a permanent, but ever evolving exhibit at the farm, telling the stories of the four coastal parishes covered by Lønstrup Cliff (including Rubjeg Knude) and the unique conditions of life and nature found here. The Wreck Master's Farm is also known as Jens Thomsen's farm, in remembrance of a former owner - and the first wreck master of Rubjeg Knude - who overtook the place from his father in 1838. The place has been on the hands of the Thomsen family since 1814, when Jens' father Thomas, acquired the farm and it is now owned by the great-great grandson of Jens.

== Gallery ==
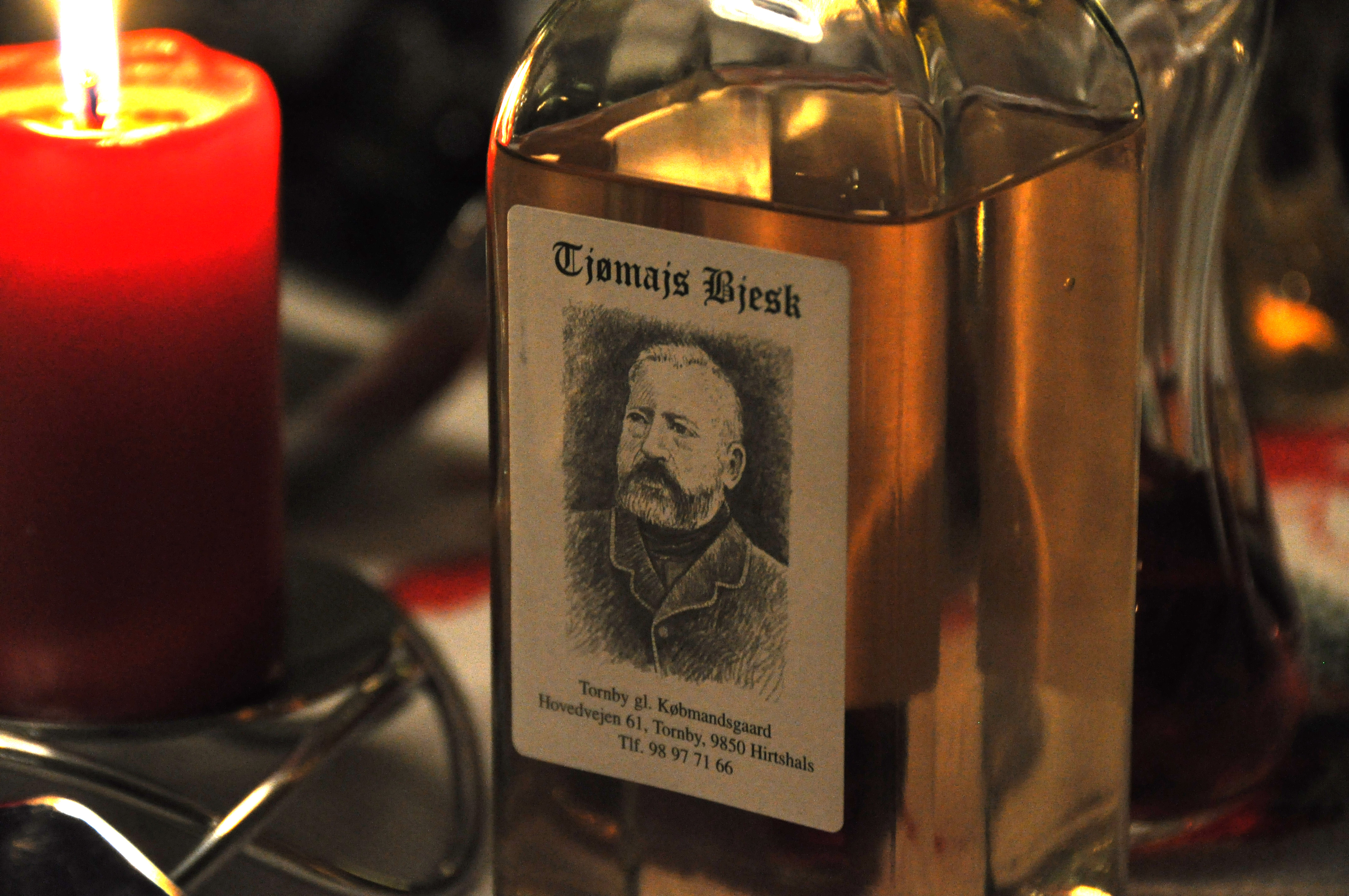
A bottle of Bjesk from Tornby near Hirtshals.

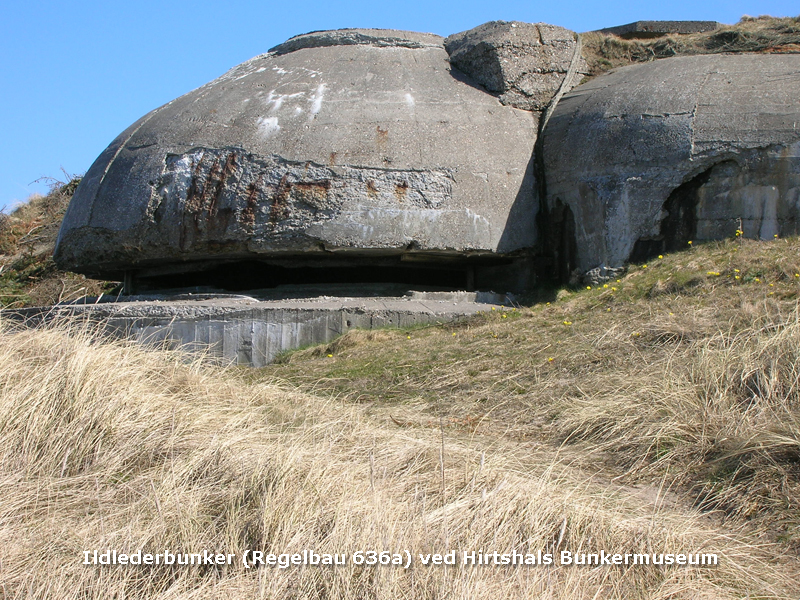
The bunkers at Hirtshals.

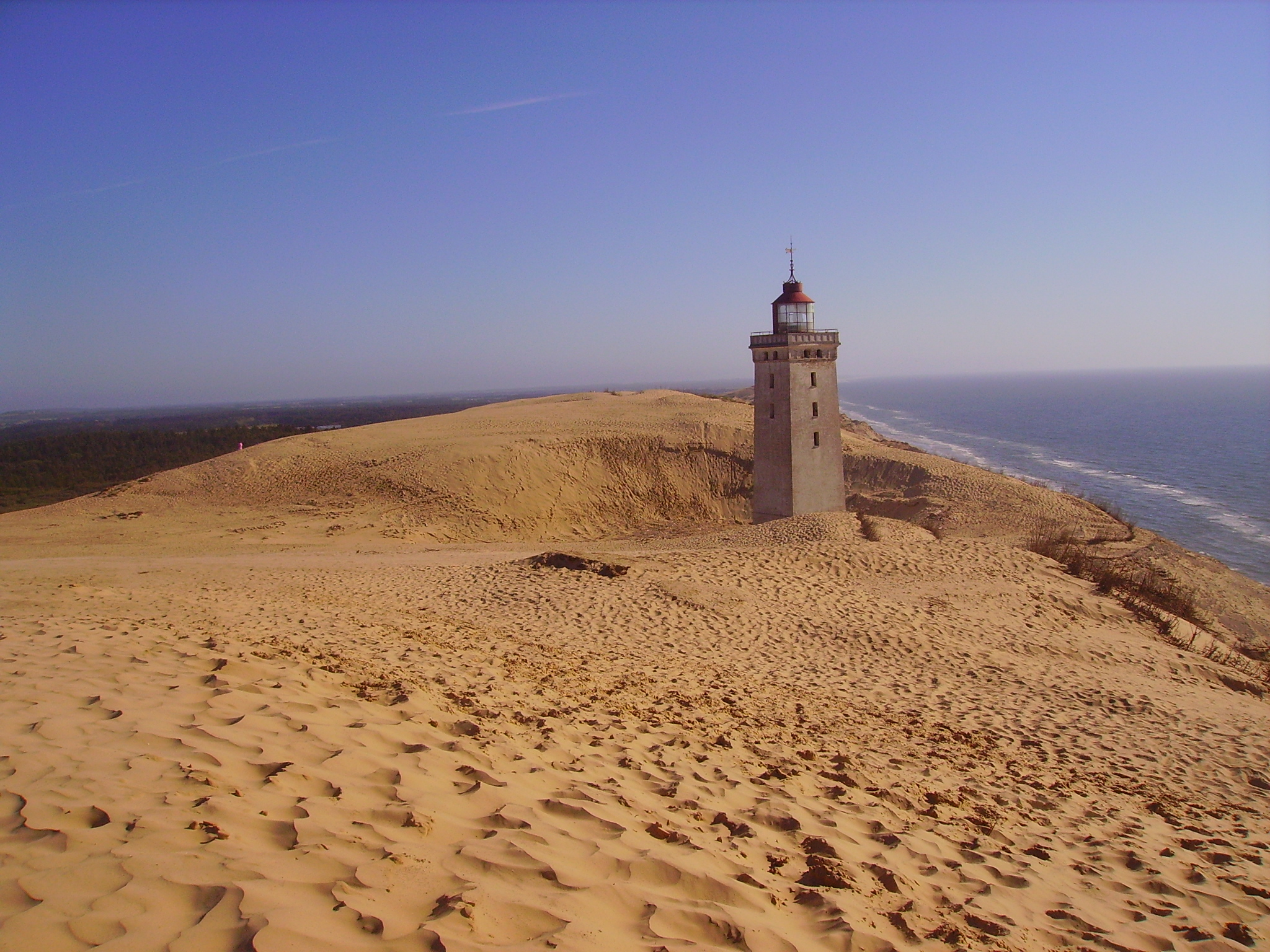
The harsh landscape at Rubjerg Knude.

== Sources ==
- Official website
