= Hjørring =

- Town
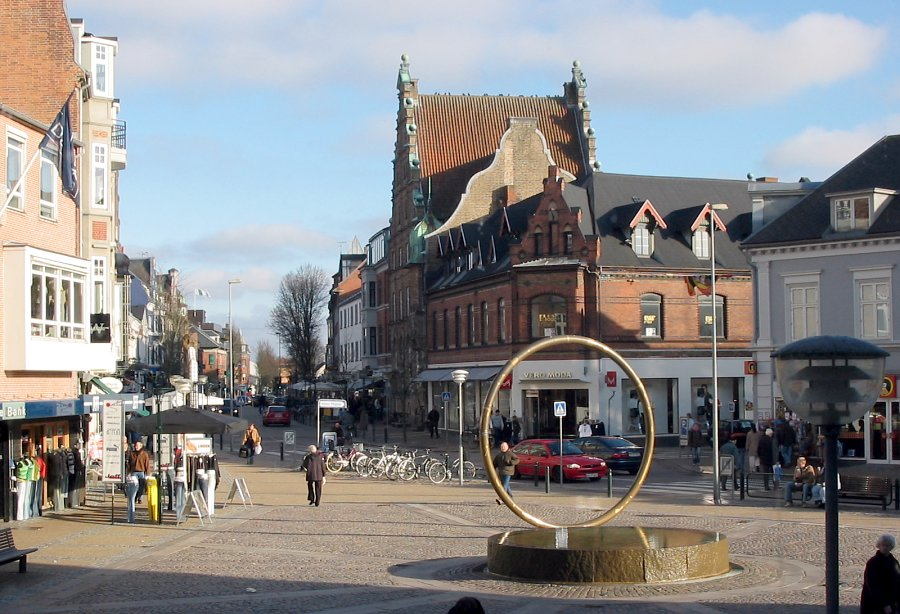
- Hjørring

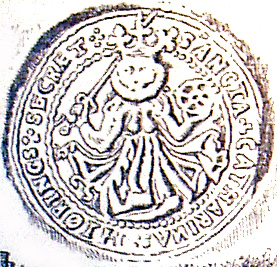
- Seal Coat of arms

- Location within Denmark Location within Scandinavia Location within Europe
- Coordinates: 57°27′49″N 09°58′53″E
- Country: Denmark
- Region: North Denmark (Nordjylland)
- Municipality: Hjørring

Area
  - Urban: 17.8 km^{2} (6.9 sq mi)
- Elevation: 50 m (160 ft)

Population (2026)
  - Urban: 25,794
  - Urban density: 1,450/km^{2} (3,750/sq mi)
  - Municipality: 62,979
  - Gender: 12,489 males and 13,305 females
- Demonym: Hjørringgenser
- Time zone: UTC+1 (CET)
  - Summer (DST): UTC+2 (CEST)
- Postal code: 9800
- Area code: (+45) 72
- Website: hjoerring.dk

Hjørring (Danish pronunciation: [ˈjɶɐ̯e̝ŋ]) is a town on the island of Vendsyssel-Thy at the top of the Jutland peninsula in northern Denmark. It is the main town and the administrative seat of Hjørring Municipality in the North Jutland Region. The population is 25,794 (according to an official census carried on 1 January 2026). It is also one of Denmark's oldest towns, having celebrated its 750th anniversary as a market town in 1993.

Hjørring is centrally located in a sparsely populated area and serves as an urban center for large parts of especially the western and central Vendsyssel.

== History ==
=== Middle Ages ===
Although archaeological discoveries show that the area was already populated 10,000 years ago, it cannot be determined exactly when an actual urban community arose. However, the town is undoubtedly Vendsyssel's oldest market town, and has been significant throughout the Middle Ages. Around 1147–1150, coins were minted in the town. A found bracteate bears the inscription Heringa, which is the Latin name for Hjørring. Throughout the Middle Ages, the thing (assembly) for the syssel (Note: The syssel was a historical administrative subdivision in Scandinavia) of Vendsyssel met in Hjørring. The town also became a meeting place for the clergy, and there are many indications that the bishop of Vendsyssel resided in the town at least in the 12th century.

Already in the early Middle Ages, three churches were established in the town: Saint Hans', Saint Olaf's and Saint Catherine's. The oldest known royal charter granting the city status as a market town were issued by King Eric IV of Denmark on 31 March 1243. The status was confirmed by new chartes issued on 19 April 1484, 30 October 1505 and 23 September 1514. The charter of 1505 gives an impression of the extent of the city: the medieval urban settlement was still located around the three churches at the top of the hill on which central Hjørring lies. The sysselting and assemblies of the clergy have at periods brought many people to the town and thus provided trade to the town's merchants and artisans.

=== Early modern period ===
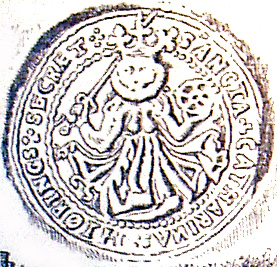
Seal of the city of Hjørring from 1650.

The 16th century was a period of decline for Hjørring. The activities of the Sysselting ceased sometime in the 1520s. Also the Count's Feud, a war of succession that raged in Denmark from 1534 to 1536 and brought about the Reformation in Denmark-Norway became expensive for Hjørring, as it forced the citizens to pay heavy ransoms and compensations. As a consequence of the Reformation the nearby rich monasteries of Børglum Abbey and Vrejlev Priory disappeared which undoubtedly had business relations with the town. A comparison of tax levies from the towns in Vendsyssel shows that both Skagen and Sæby in this period were richer and larger than Hjørring. In 1548–53, Hjørring was once again the bishop's residence, and in 1549, the town had its own Latin school. Around 1570, a fierce fire probably ravaged the city.

In 1602 the town was hit by the plague, and during the Thirty Years' War, imperial troops were housed in the town in 1627–29. In 1644, during the Torstenson War, the city was occupied by Swedish troops, and after the war, Danish soldiers were housed. In 1647 another violent fire broke out, destroying 17 farms, and in 1657–58, during the Second Northern War, the town was again occupied by enemy troops, who starved the population through discharges and lodging.

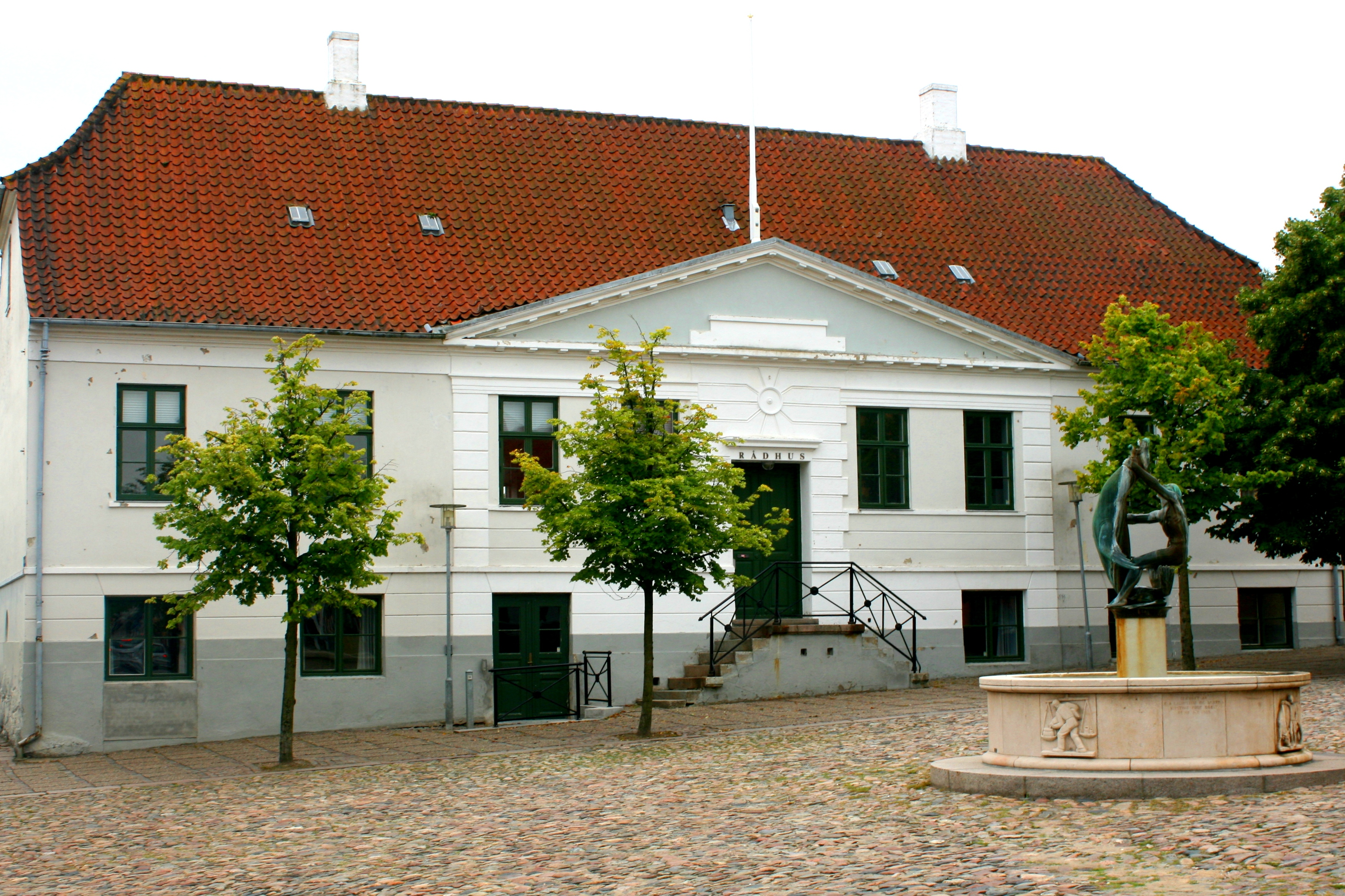
The old town hall of Hjørring from 1834.

A major fire burned down much of the town in 1819.

=== Industrialization ===
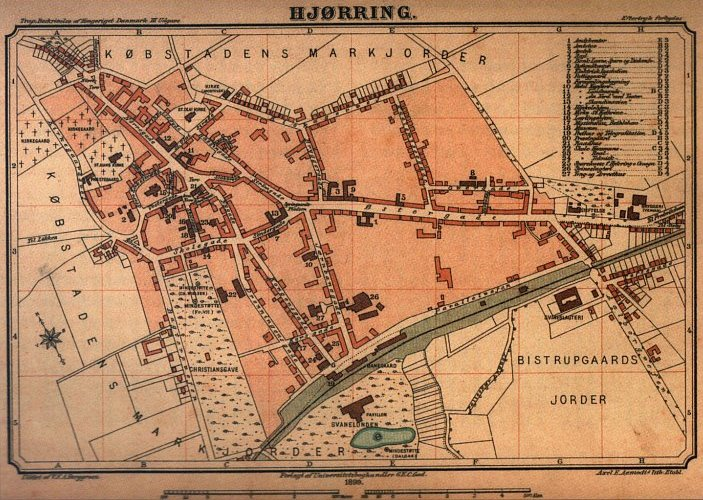
Map of Hjørring in 1899.

Economic growth really took off around 1850, and by 1900 the population had more than quadrupled. The street network was expanded, and on 15 August 1871, the Vendsyssel railway line between Aalborg and Frederikshavn was opened, after which exports went over this city. New iron foundries and machine factories were set up in addition to spinning mills and garment factories. In 1883 the Vendia Brewery began, in 1890 a tobacco factory was opened, and in 1891 the cooperative slaughterhouse was established. A power plant opened in 1896.

=== Post-war period ===
After World War II Hjørring continued its population growth. At the same time, there was further growth in the suburban settlements outside the city. Thorough urban redevelopment in the 1960s led to a complete demolition of the neighborhood around Fiskerbakken and Bassingade south of Sankt Olai Church in favor of parking spaces. As a consequence of the state's regional development policy, the Army Materiel Command moved to the city in 1971. On the eastern outskirts of the city, a large industrial area emerged, which for the most part is characterized by the metal industry.

=== 21st century ===
With the opening of the motorway between Hjørring and Brønderslev in 2002, the city was connected to the rest of the European motorway network.

== Geography ==
=== Cityscape ===
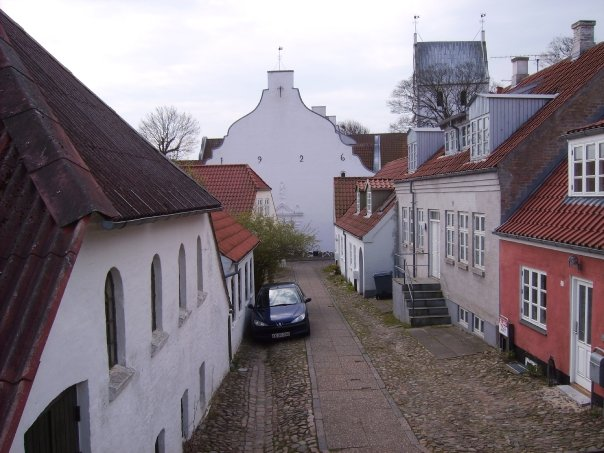
Street in Hjørring.

Hjørring has been changing in recent years, with new shops and franchises opening mainly outside the city center. The most recent addition to Hjørring is the new city shopping centre, Metropol, which has led to a change in the city centre as one of Hjørring's main streets, Østergade, has been closed to vehicular traffic and is now open only for pedestrians and bicycles. Metropol which was inaugurated in March 2008, is located on Østergade and also houses the city's public library.

== Arts and culture ==
=== Museums ===
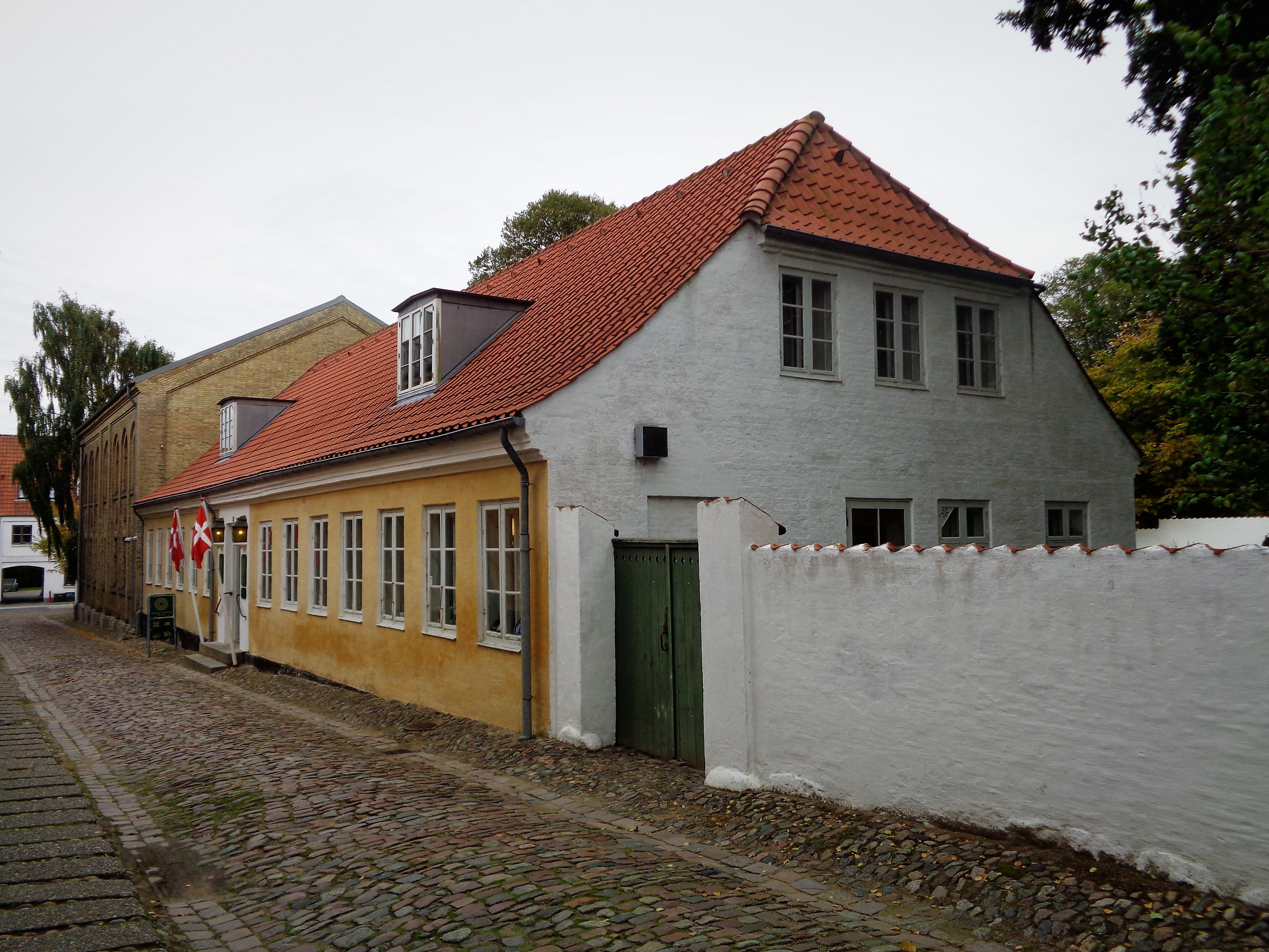
Vendsyssel Historical Museum.

Hjørring holds the headquarters of the regional museum of Vendsyssel Historical Museum. It is located in the city center in Museumsgade. Apart from the exhibitions and museum itself, there is a small, publicly accessible park and garden area, that facilitates picnics.

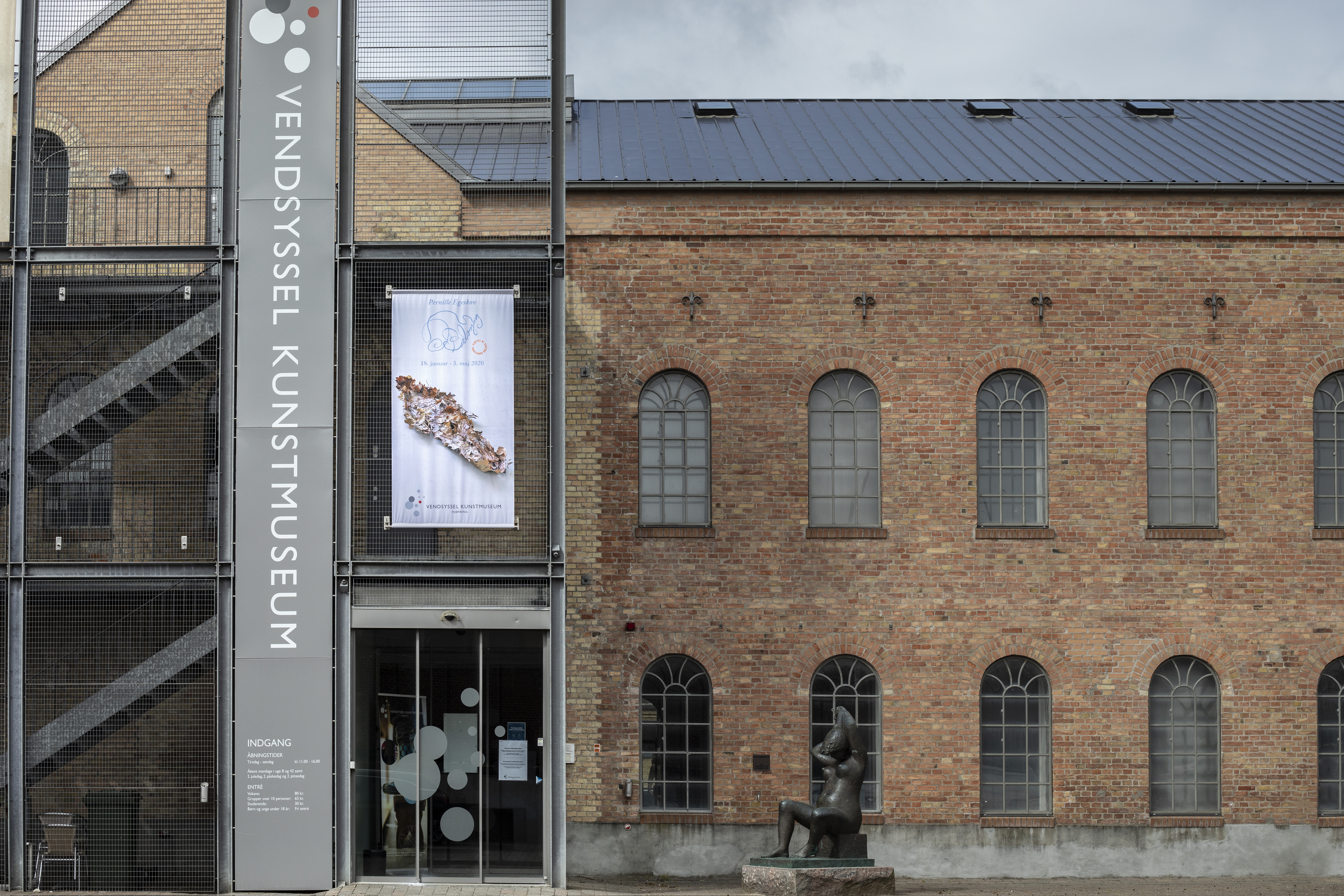
Vendsyssel Art Museum.

Vendsyssel Art Museum is the main art museum in the province, located in a former textile factory in the city center. It has a considerable collection of artists influenced by the landscapes and surroundings of Northern Denmark, but also presents changing exhibitions of mostly contemporary art.

=== Performing arts ===
The town is home for the Hjørring Revue (Hjørring revyen), a summer revue that has been a part of Hjørring's entertainment life since the 1920s and one more revue, the Lundergaard Revue (Lundergaard Revyen). The latter revue celebrated its 25th anniversary in 2008. The revue has about 5000 guests a summer over.

=== Festivals and events ===
Dana Cup, one of the world's largest football tournaments, takes place in Hjørring at the end of July, with 20,000 footballers from all around the world. The tournament celebrated its 25th anniversary in 2006.

=== Football clubs ===
- Vendsyssel FF
- Hjørring IF
- Fortuna Hjørring
- AIK FREM Hjørring
- Bagterp IF
- LIUF
- Skibsby-Højene IF
- Hjørring Futsal Klub

== Education ==
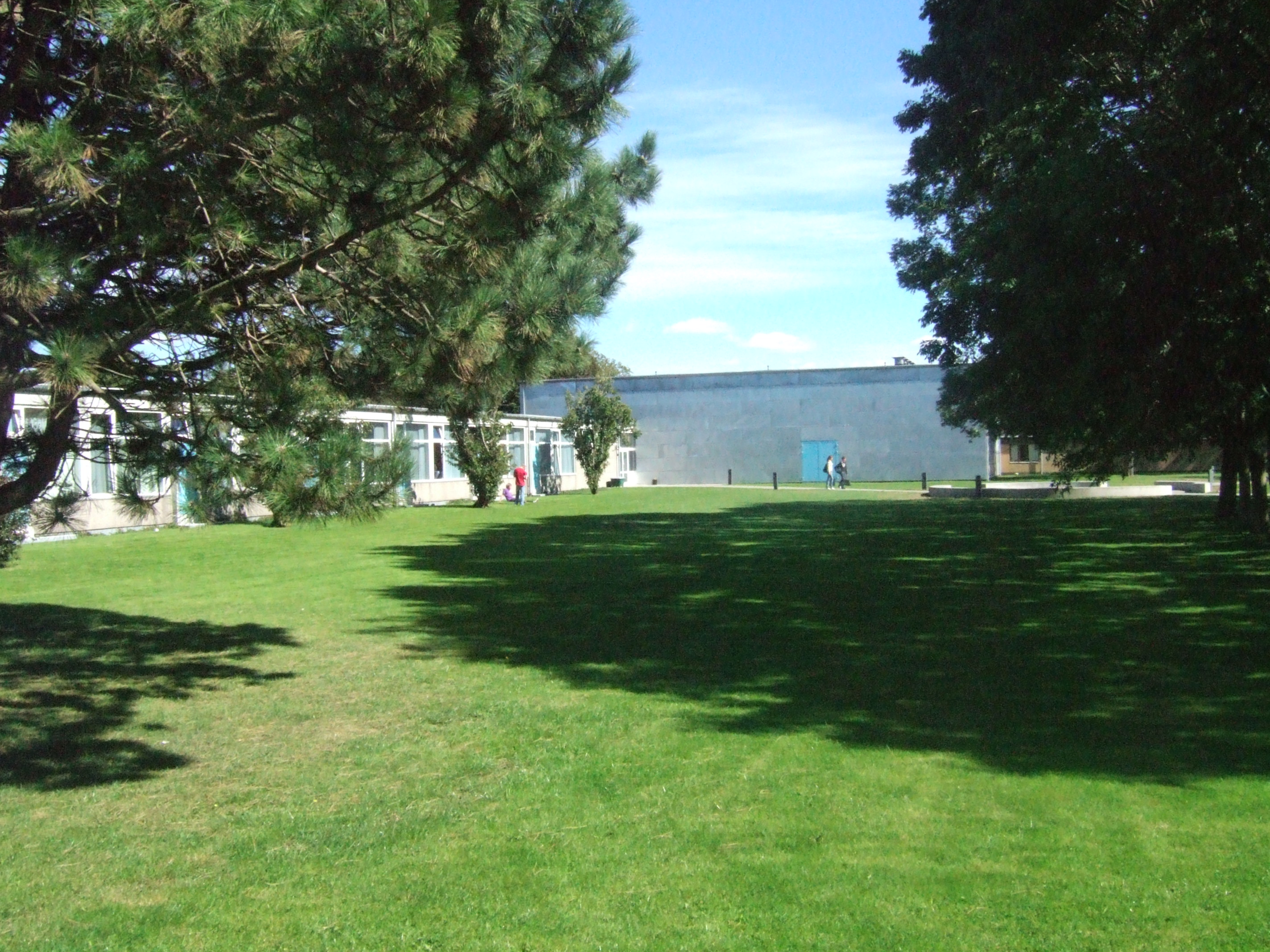
Hjørring Gymnasium

There are good educational opportunities in the town including a gymnasium (the Danish equivalent of a high school or pre-college), a business and technical college and a nursing school. One of the two branches of Profession School University College North Jutland (Danish: Professionshøjskolen University College Nordjylland) can be found in Hjørring.

See also EUC Nord.

== Transportation ==
=== Rail ===
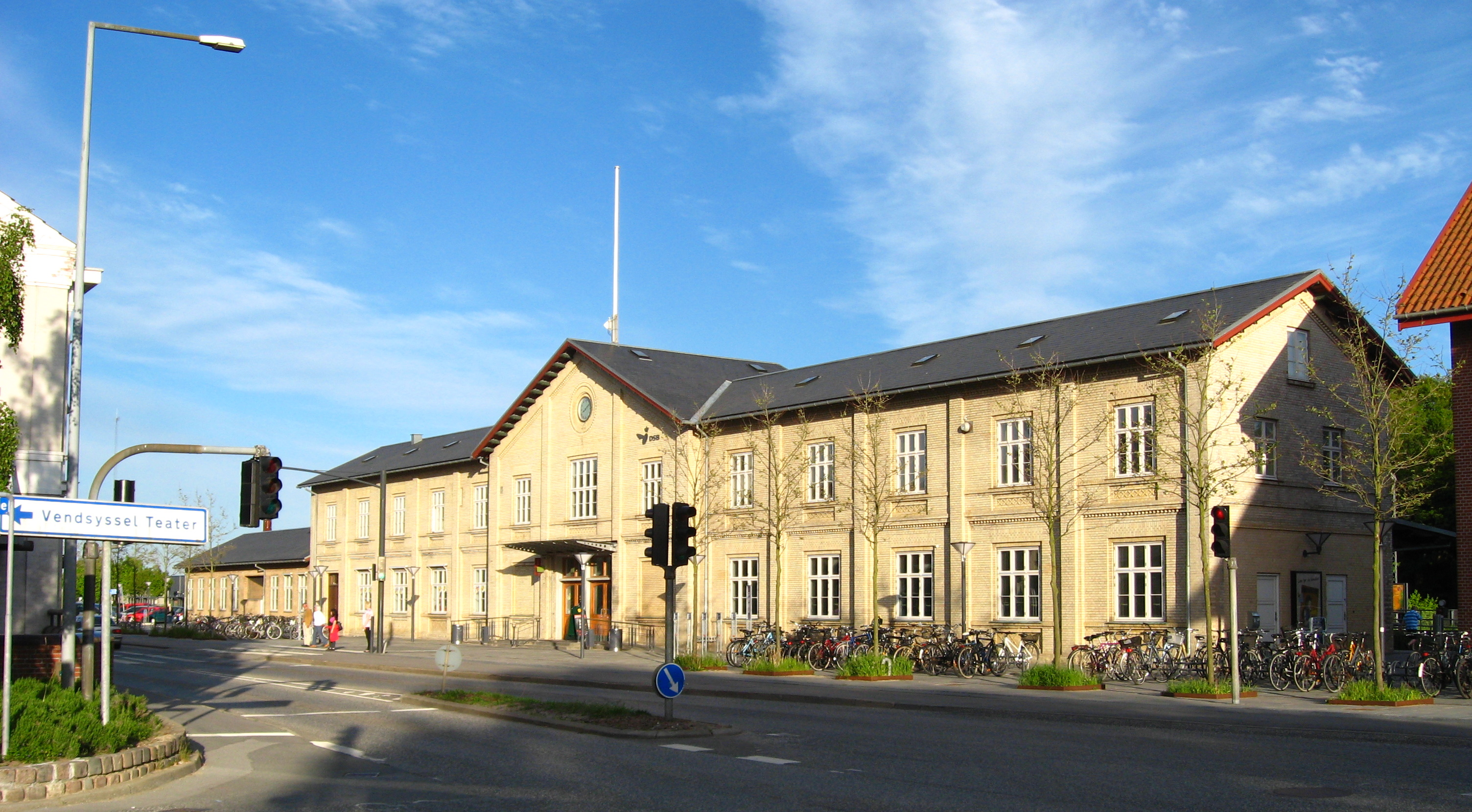
Hjørring railway station.

Hjørring railway station is the principal railway station of the town. It is located on the Vendsyssel railway line between Aalborg and Frederikshavn and is the terminus of the Hirtshals railway line. It offers direct InterCity services to Copenhagen, regional train services to Frederikshavn and Aalborg and local train services to Hirtshals. The town is also served by the railway halts Hjørring East, Kvægtorvet, Teglgårdsvej, Herregårdsparken, and Vellingshøj.

=== Air ===
The nearest airport with scheduled national and international flights is Aalborg Airport c. 45 km south of Hjørring.

== Healthcare ==
Hjørring also has a large hospital.

== Notable people ==
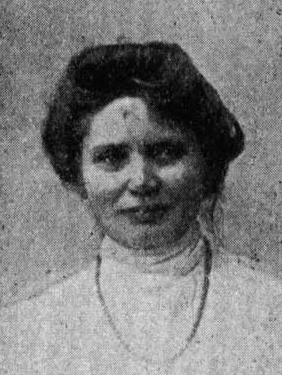
Charlotte Eilersgaard, 1910

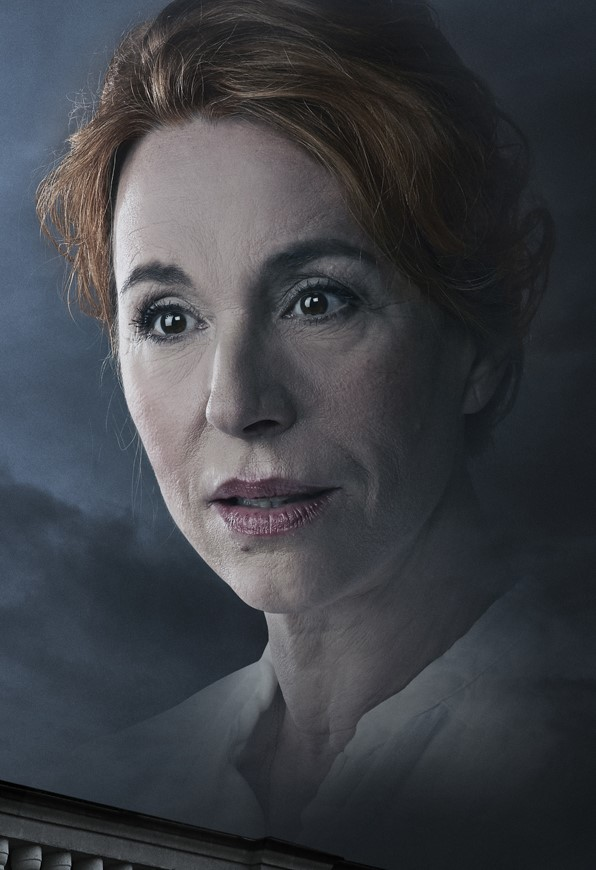
Ann Eleonora Jørgensen, 2015

- Hans Gram (1685 in Bjergby – 1748) a Danish academic and historian
- Lauritz Smith (1830–1924) an early Latter-day Saint leader and co-founder of Draper, Utah, USA
- Niels Peter Bornholdt (1842–1924) a Danish shipping agent and landowner
- Aksel Mikkelsen (1849–1929) an educator, introduced the Swedish system of sloyd schools to Denmark.
- Charlotte Eilersgaard (1858–1922) a Danish writer and editor who wrote short stories, plays and novels, involved in the women's movement, especially women's voting rights
- Benedicte Wrensted (1859–1949) a notable Danish-American photographer, emigrated to the US in 1894, photographed the Shoshone native people in Idaho
- Johan Kjær Hansen (1907–1944) a member of the Danish resistance executed by the German occupying power
- Axel Borup-Jørgensen (1924–2012) a Danish composer
- Knud Sørensen (born 1928) a Danish writer, poet and novelist
- Hanne Kjærholm (1930–2009) a Danish architect, taught at the Royal Danish Academy of Fine Arts
- Poul Anker Bech (1942–2009) a Danish painter incorporating surrealistic elements
- Hanne-Vibeke Holst (born 1959) an author and journalist
- Ann Eleonora Jørgensen (born 1965) a Danish film, television and stage actor
- Morten Middelfart (born 1970) a Danish entrepreneur, inventor and technologist; designed TARGIT Business Intelligence software
- Kasper Bai (born 1974) a Danish songwriter, composer, arranger and guitarist

=== Sport ===
- Ellen Osiier (1890–1962) an Olympic fencing foil champion, gold medallist at the 1924 Summer Olympics
- Robert Larsen (1898–1981) a Danish boxer who competed in the 1924 Summer Olympics
- Victor Jörgensen (1924–2001) a boxer, bronze medallist at the 1952 Summer Olympics
- Mogens Krogh (born 1963) a Danish retired professional football goalkeeper, 654 pro appearances
- Jannik Pohl (born 1996) a Danish football player for FC Groningen

== Sister cities ==
Hjørring is twinned with:

Changchun, China; Kerava, Finland	Kristiansand, Norway; Reykjanesbær, Iceland	Runavík, Faroe Islands; Trollhättan, Sweden

== See also ==
- Saint Olaf's Church, Hjørring
- Hjørring Baptist Church
