= Targit (company) =

Danish software

TARGIT A/S
- Type: Aktieselskab
- Industry: Business Intelligence; Software
- Predecessor: Sandlykke/Leifsgaard
- Founded: May 1986
- Headquarters: Aalborg, North Jutland, Denmark
- Area served: Worldwide
- Key people: Jakob H. Kraglund;(CEO); Tommy Jensen;(CTO); Kim Mortensen;(CCO); Lise Luckow;(CMO); Joachim Selchau Majlund;(CFO)
- Revenue: $ 21 million (2012)
- Number of employees: 75 (2021)
- Subsidiaries: TARGIT US Inc.
- Website: www.targit.com

TARGIT A/S is a Danish business intelligence (BI) and analytics software developer based in Aalborg, Denmark, with American subsidiary TARGIT US Inc., based in Tampa, as well as international offices.

== History ==
TARGIT was founded in 1986 by Morten Sandlykke and Søren Leifsgård under the name Sandlykke & Leifsgård.

In 1996, Sandlykke and Leifsgård acquired Morton Systems, led by Morten Middelfart. Following the acquisition, Middelfart became TARGIT's CTO, and the company began developing business intelligence (BI) tools. Middelfart was pivotal in the company's decision to purchase PALM—a BI software product designed in the US that served as the forerunner to the TARGIT Decision Suite solution.

In 1999, the trio sold the hardware-focused side of the organization and rebranded their remaining business as TARGIT, a BI and analytics company. In the early 2000s, TARGIT expanded from its headquarters in Aalborg, Denmark, opening a second office in Copenhagen and two US offices in Tampa, Florida, and Dublin, Ohio, respectively. The company also has an office in Belgium and external employees in Belarus, Croatia, and Poland.

In 2017, TARGIT became part of the private equity fund GRO Capital, and Director and Founder Morten Sandlykke stepped down from the executive team.

As of 26th June 2026, TARGIT has entered into a binding acquisition agreement with Forterro.

== Decision Suite ==
TARGIT Decision Suite is a BI and analytics platform that, according to TARGIT, "helps companies integrate, analyze, and share data from multiple sources via reports and digital dashboards."

The first version of TARGIT Decision Suite dates back to 1996, when TARGIT acquired Morton Systems. CTO Morten Middelfart developed Decision Suite around the concept of the OODA Decision Loop (Observe, Orient, Decide, and Act) and his own CALM philosophy (Computer Aided Leadership & Management).
