= 2021 Rebild municipal election =

← 2017	16 November 2021	2025 →

All 25 seats to the Rebild Municipal Council 13 seats needed for a majority
- Turnout: 17,573 (75.8%) ▼2.7pp
	First party	Second party	Third party
	V	C	A
Party	Venstre	Conservatives	Social Democrats
Last election	8 seats, 26.8%	3 seats, 13.3%	6 seats, 15.2%
Seats won	7	6	4
Seat change	▼1	▲3	▼2
Popular vote	4,382	3,821	2,506
Percentage	25.2%	22.0%	14.4%
Swing	▼1.6%	▲8.7%	▼0.8%
	Fourth party	Fifth party	Sixth party
	L	B	F
Party	Den Sociale Fællesliste - Rebild	Social Liberals	Green Left
Last election	4 seats, 15.7%	3 seats, 10.6%	0 seats, 2.8%
Seats won	4	2	1
Seat change	0	▼1	▲1
Popular vote	2,488	1,545	1,002
Percentage	14.3%	8.9%	5.8%
Swing	▼1.4%	▼2.3%	▲3.0%
	Seventh party	Eighth party
	Ø	O
Party	Red–Green Alliance	Danish People's Party
Last election	0 seats, 3.2%	2 seats, 7.0%
Seats won	1	0
Seat change	▲1	▼2
Popular vote	531	445
Percentage	3.1%	2.6%
Swing	▼0.1%	▼4.4%
Mayor before election
Leon Sebbelin
Social Liberals
Mayor after election
Jesper Greth
Venstre

Despite only having won 3 of the 25 seats in 2013 and 2017, Leon Sebbelin from the Social Liberals had been mayor of Rebild since 2014. Rebild was a part of the '10 biggest thrillers for the 2021 Danish Local Election', according to Danish news station TV 2. Danish political analyst Hans Redder pointed out before the election, that the constitution for who would become mayor could become untraditional, as seen in 2017, when Danish People's Party, who are seen as a big contrast to the Social Liberals, still supported Leon Sebbelin becoming mayor. The final election result, would see Conservatives enjoying the biggest improvent, with 22% of the vote, compared to the 13% they had received in 2017. Both Venstre and Social Liberals lost a seat. However, the day following the election, a constitution was announced, that would see Jesper Greth, from Venstre, becoming mayor.

== Electoral system ==
For elections to Danish municipalities, a number varying from 9 to 31 are chosen to be elected to the municipal council. The seats are then allocated using the D'Hondt method and a closed list proportional representation. Rebild Municipality had 25 seats in 2021

Unlike in Danish General Elections, in elections to municipal councils, electoral alliances are allowed.

== Electoral alliances ==
=== Electoral Alliance 1 ===
Party		Political alignment
A	Social Democrats	Centre-left
L	Den Sociale Fællesliste - Rebild	Local politics

=== Electoral Alliance 2 ===
Party		Political alignment
C	Conservatives	Centre-right
O	Danish People's Party	Right-wing to Far-right
V	Venstre	Centre-right

=== Electoral Alliance 3 ===
Party		Political alignment
F	Green Left	Centre-left to Left-wing
Ø	Red–Green Alliance	Left-wing to Far-Left

== Results by polling station ==
Polling Station	A	B	C	D	F	L	O	V	Ø	H
Polling Station	%	%	%	%	%	%	%	%	%	%
Støvring	17.3	8.0	33.4	3.3	5.0	5.8	1.7	23.8	1.5	0.3
Skørping	17.5	14.9	13.2	2.2	16.0	13.5	1.5	12.6	8.4	0.2
Terndrup	6.2	6.1	9.2	3.3	2.9	53.9	1.7	14.7	2.0	0.0
Suldrup	12.0	5.7	30.3	4.1	3.3	8.1	2.3	32.0	2.1	0.1
Nørager	12.7	5.5	13.9	5.2	2.0	5.1	4.3	49.3	2.0	0.0
Haverslev	14.4	5.1	17.2	4.9	2.2	5.5	2.7	47.2	0.8	0.3
Øster Hornum	15.9	9.0	18.1	3.0	5.2	8.9	1.0	37.1	1.9	0.0
Bælum	9.8	9.9	24.3	4.3	2.6	33.5	1.8	10.0	3.9	0.0
Ravnkilde	18.1	6.4	14.4	4.1	2.5	5.6	23.3	22.7	2.9	0.0
Blenstrup	10.2	13.5	9.2	3.7	5.7	40.4	1.4	12.6	3.4	0.0
Veggerby	9.7	14.4	15.9	5.5	3.5	7.0	1.7	36.8	5.5	0.0

== Results ==
Party		Votes	%	+/-	Seats	+/-
Rebild Municipality
V	Venstre	4,382	25.24	-1.61	7	-1
C	Conservatives	3,821	22.01	+8.68	6	+3
A	Social Democrats	2,506	14.43	-0.75	4	-1
L	Den Sociale Fællesliste - Rebild	2,488	14.33	-1.40	4	0
B	Social Liberals	1,545	8.90	-1.76	2	-1
F	Green Left	1,002	5.77	+2.99	1	+1
D	New Right	619	3.57	New	0	New
Ø	Red-Green Alliance	531	3.06	-0.13	1	+1
O	Danish People's Party	445	2.56	-4.44	0	-2
H	Lige højre	24	0.14	New	0	New
Total		17,363	100	N/A	25	N/A
Invalid votes		45	0.19	-0.07		
Blank votes		165	0.71	-0.25		
Turnout		17,573	75.80	-2.70		
Source: valg.dk
