= 2025 Rebild municipal election =

- 18 November 2025

All 23 seats to the Rebild municipal council 12 seats needed for a majority
- Turnout: 18,037 (76.1%) ▲0.3%
	First party	Second party	Third party
	V	A	C
Party	Venstre	Social Democrats	Conservatives
Last election	7 seats, 25.2%	4 seats, 14.4%	6 seats, 22.0%
Seats won	7	5	4
Seat change	0	▲1	▼2
Popular vote	4,586	3,266	2,957
Percentage	25.8%	18.4%	16.6%
Swing	▲0.5%	▲3.9%	▼5.4%
	Fourth party	Fifth party	Sixth party
	F	Æ	L
Party	Green Left	Denmark Democrats	Den Sociale Fællesliste
Last election	1 seat, 5.8%	Did not stand	4 seats, 14.3%
Seats won	3	2	1
Seat change	▲2	▲2	▼3
Popular vote	1,980	1,641	1,174
Percentage	11.1%	9.2%	6.6%
Swing	▲5.4%	New	▼7.7%
	Seventh party	Eighth party
	B	Ø
Party	Social Liberals	Red-Green Alliance
Last election	2 seats, 8.9%	1 seat, 3.1%
Seats won	1	0
Seat change	▼1	▼1
Popular vote	766	654
Percentage	4.3%	3.7%
Swing	▼4.6%	▲0.6%
Mayor before election
Jesper Greth
Venstre
Mayor after election
Jesper Greth
Venstre

The 2025 Rebild Municipal election was held on November 18, 2025, to elect the 23 members to sit in the regional council for the Rebild Municipal council, in the period of 2026 to 2029. Jesper Greth would once again win the mayoral position.

== Background ==
Following the 2021 election, a constitution was announced, that would see Jesper Greth, from Venstre, becoming mayor. It was already decided in May 2024, that Greth would seek re-election as Venstre's mayoral candidate for the 2025 election.

The municipal council will elect 23 members this election, contrary to 25 in the previous.

=== 2021 Election Results and notional results with 23 Seats Contested ===
Parties	Vote		Seats		
Parties	Votes	%	Actual Seats	Notional Seats	+ / -
Venstre	4,382	25.2	7	6	-1
Conservatives	3,821	12.0	6	6	0
Social Democrats	2,506	14.4	6	6	0
Den Sociale Fællesliste - Rebild	2,488	14.3	4	3	-1
Social Liberals	1,545	8.9	2	2	0
Green Left	1,002	5.8	1	1	0
Red–Green Alliance	531	3.1	1	1	0
Total	17,363	100.0	25	23	-2

== Electoral system ==
For elections to Danish municipalities, a number varying from 9 to 31 are chosen to be elected to the municipal council. The seats are then allocated using the D'Hondt method and a closed list proportional representation. Rebild Municipality had 23 seats in 2025.

Unlike in Danish General Elections, in elections to municipal councils, electoral alliances are allowed.

== Electoral alliances ==
=== Electoral Alliance 1 ===
Party		Political alignment
A	Social Democrats	Centre-left
L	Den Sociale Fællesliste	Local politics
R	Rebild Listen	Local politics

=== Electoral Alliance 2 ===
Party		Political alignment
B	Social Liberals	Centre to Centre-left
F	Green Left	Centre-left to Left-wing
Ø	Red-Green Alliance	Left-wing to Far-Left

=== Electoral Alliance 3 ===
Party		Political alignment
C	Conservatives	Centre-right
O	Danish People's Party	Right-wing to Far-right
V	Venstre	Centre-right
Æ	Denmark Democrats	Right-wing to Far-right

== Results by polling station ==
Division	A	B	C	F	L	O	R	V	Æ	Ø
Division	%	%	%	%	%	%	%	%	%	%
Støvring	22.6	4.5	20.8	8.3	1.1	2.5	0.6	31.4	6.5	1.7
Skørping	18.6	6.2	11.2	26.3	6.2	1.3	2.3	11.8	5.6	10.5
Terndrup	15.0	2.8	6.7	5.8	27.7	2.4	5.9	19.4	11.7	2.4
Suldrup	13.2	2.0	32.2	8.2	1.7	4.0	1.0	24.3	10.9	2.4
Nørager	14.0	2.6	13.6	3.8	2.4	3.8	0.8	42.2	13.8	3.0
Haverslev	14.1	2.7	6.6	3.3	2.8	3.4	0.9	51.9	12.5	1.8
Øster Hornum	16.8	2.8	22.3	22.1	1.1	2.1	0.8	23.9	6.3	1.9
Bælum	12.4	2.8	10.6	6.3	33.5	3.0	2.8	13.7	11.4	3.4
Ravnkilde	26.0	1.7	9.9	5.4	4.1	3.9	2.9	24.4	18.4	3.3
Blenstrup	19.8	12.6	6.9	7.0	15.8	2.4	2.9	11.3	16.7	4.5
Veggerby	15.1	6.3	19.1	9.3	2.3	4.3	0.5	23.9	15.6	3.5

== Results ==
Party		Votes	%	+/-	Seats	+/-
Rebild Municipality
V	Venstre	4,586	25.78	+0.55	7	0
A	Social Democrats	3,266	18.36	+3.93	5	+1
C	Conservatives	2,957	16.63	-5.38	4	-2
F	Green Left	1,980	11.13	+5.36	3	+2
Æ	Denmark Democrats	1,641	9.23	New	2	New
L	Den Sociale Fællesliste	1,174	6.60	-7.73	1	-3
B	Social Liberals	766	4.31	-4.59	1	-1
Ø	Red-Green Alliance	654	3.68	+0.62	0	-1
O	Danish People's Party	475	2.67	+0.11	0	0
R	Rebild Listen	287	1.61	New	0	New
Total		17,786	100	N/A	23	N/A
Invalid votes		43	0.18	-0.01		
Blank votes		208	0.88	+0.20		
Turnout		18,037	76.14	+0.34		
Source: valg.dk

== Opinion polls ==
Polling firm	Fieldwork date	Sample size	V	C	A	L	B	F	Ø	O	R	Æ	Others	Lead
Epinion	4 Sep - 13 Oct 2025	449	24.9	6.8	24.5	–	3.0	11.5	4.4	4.0	–	15.0	5.7	0.4
2024 european parliament election	9 Jun 2024		18.6	8.1	14.9	–	5.8	13.4	4.2	5.0	–	17.0	–	1.6
2022 general election	1 Nov 2022		15.3	5.3	30.2	–	2.9	6.0	2.6	1.3	–	16.9	–	13.3
2021 regional election	16 Nov 2021		27.9	17.9	29.6	–	4.4	4.7	4.4	3.4	–	–	–	1.7
2021 municipal election	16 Nov 2021		25.2 (7)	22.0 (6)	14.4 (4)	14.3 (4)	8.9 (2)	5.8 (1)	3.1 (1)	2.6 (0)	–	–	–	3.2
