= Sønderup (Rebild Municipality) =

- Town
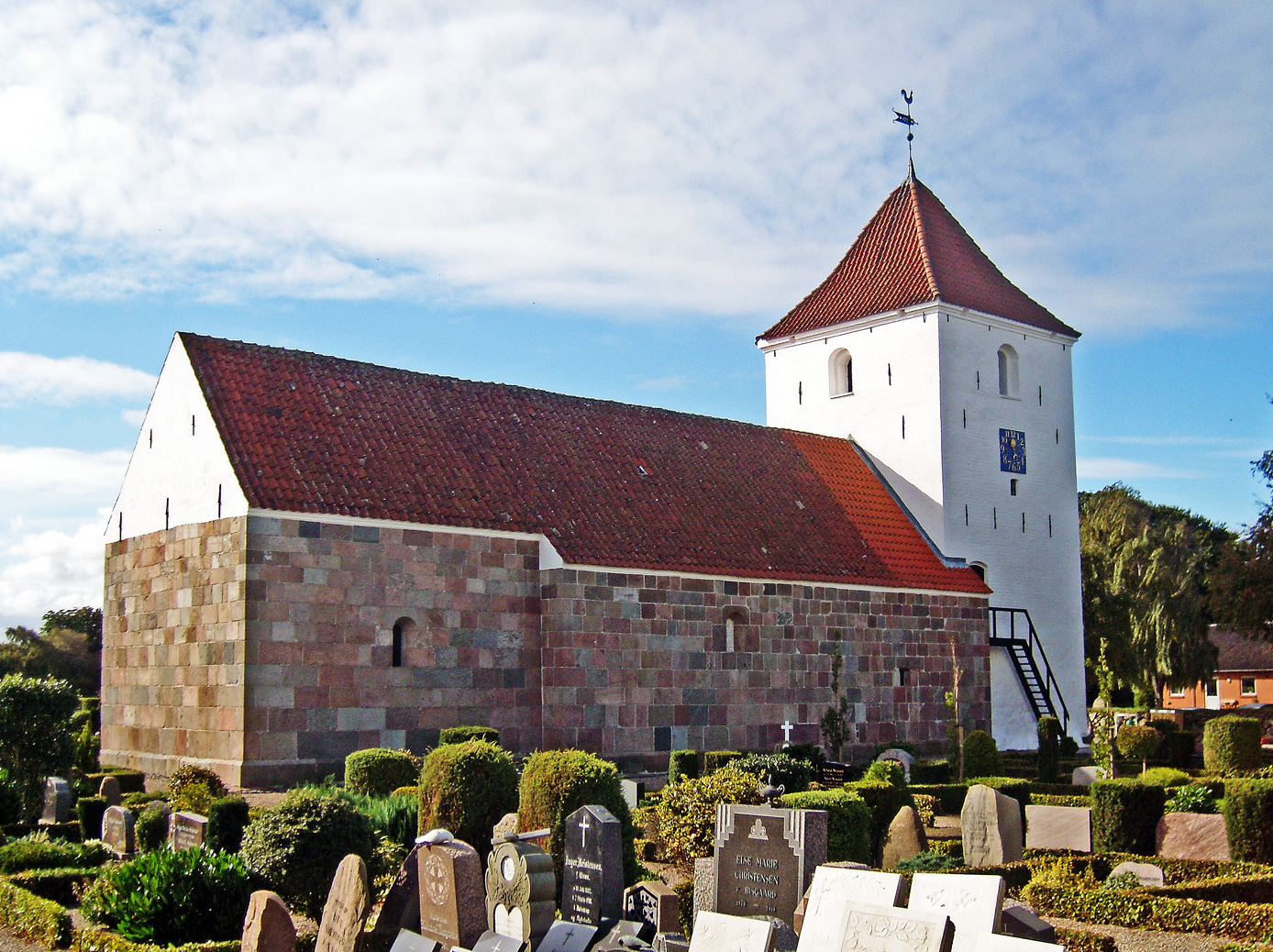
- Sønderup church

- Location in Denmark
- Coordinates: 56.812°N 9.651°E
- Country: Denmark
- Region: (North Denmark Region) Region Nordjylland
- Municipality: Vesthimmerland

Population (2023)
  - Total: 204
- Time zone: UTC+1 (CET)
  - Summer (DST): UTC+1 (CEST)
- Postal code: 860

Sønderup is a village in central Himmerland, Denmark. It is located in Sønderup parish: 10 kilometers east of Aars, five kilometers south of Suldrup, and three kilometers north of Haverslev. The village is located in the Nordjylland Region and belongs to Rebild Municipality.

As of 2023, the village had 204 inhabitants (2023).

== The village ==
Sønderup has a meeting house, where the city's associations have historically held a wide variety of events. Near Sønderup lies the partially protected Sønderup Å. Other local attractions include Rold Skov; Rebild National Park; Thingbæk limestone mines; and Rævemosen, where the Gundestrup cauldron was found.

== Sønderup church ==
The village's church, Sønderup Church (Danish: Sønderup kirke), was built in the 13th century.

A porch was added to the church in the late 1800s. In 1840, the church's old bell was cast. The tower was remodeled several times, including in 1867. During its last renovation, builders created its current pyramid spire.

"The Danish Churches" indicates without reservation that the church's clock is molded. In 2010, Sønderup Church received a new clock.

Sønderup shares a priest with Suldrup.
