= Rebild Festival =

Annual celebration of the American Independence Day in Denmark

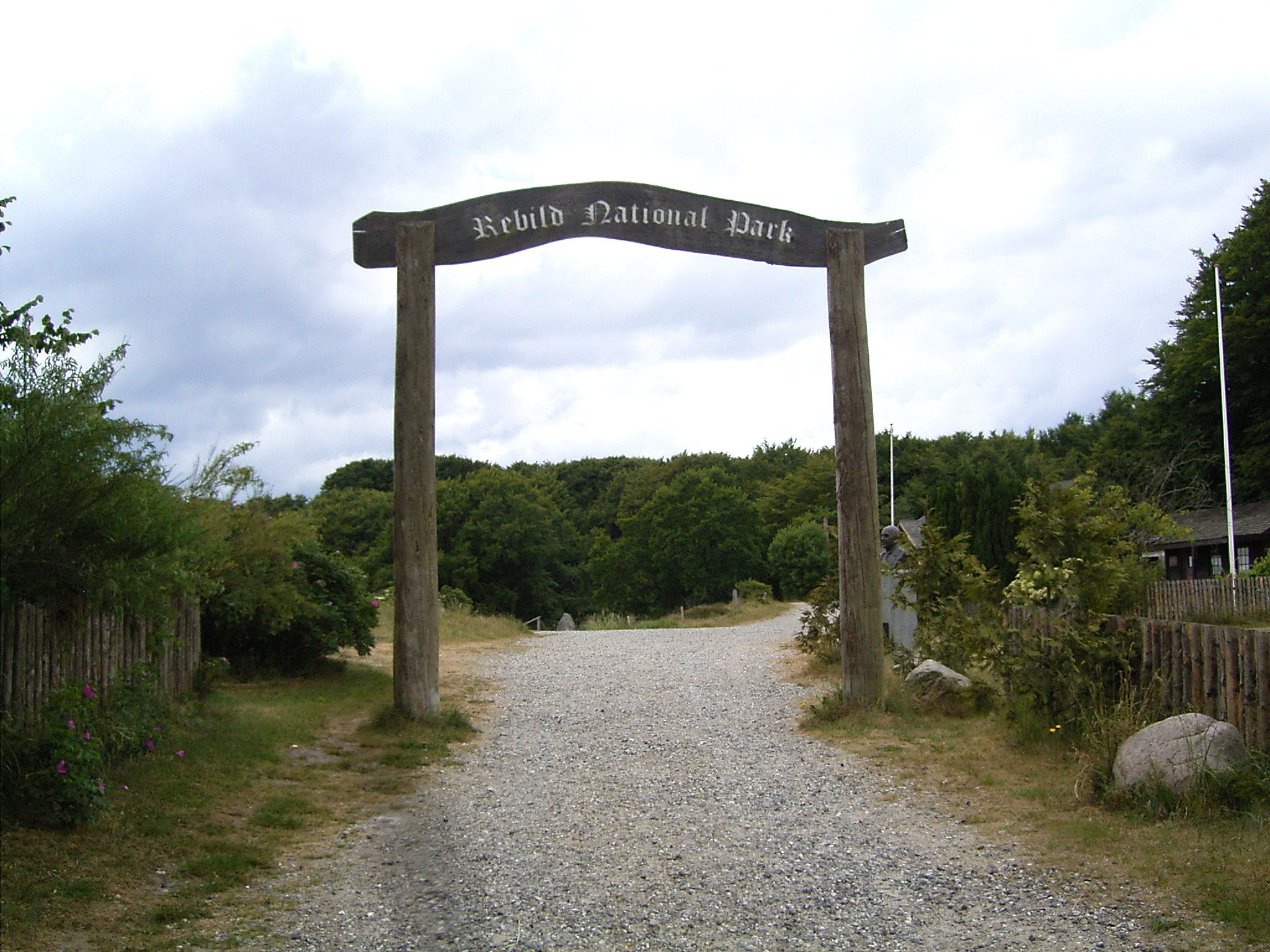
Entrance to Rebild National Park

The Rebild Festival (Danish: Rebildfesten), or Rebild Celebrations, is an annual celebration of the American Independence Day in Denmark. At the same time, it serves as a homecoming for Danish-Americans. It takes place in the Rebild National Park in Jutland from which it takes its name and is arranged by the Danish-American Rebild Society.

It is the largest event celebrating the 4th of July outside the USA.

== History ==
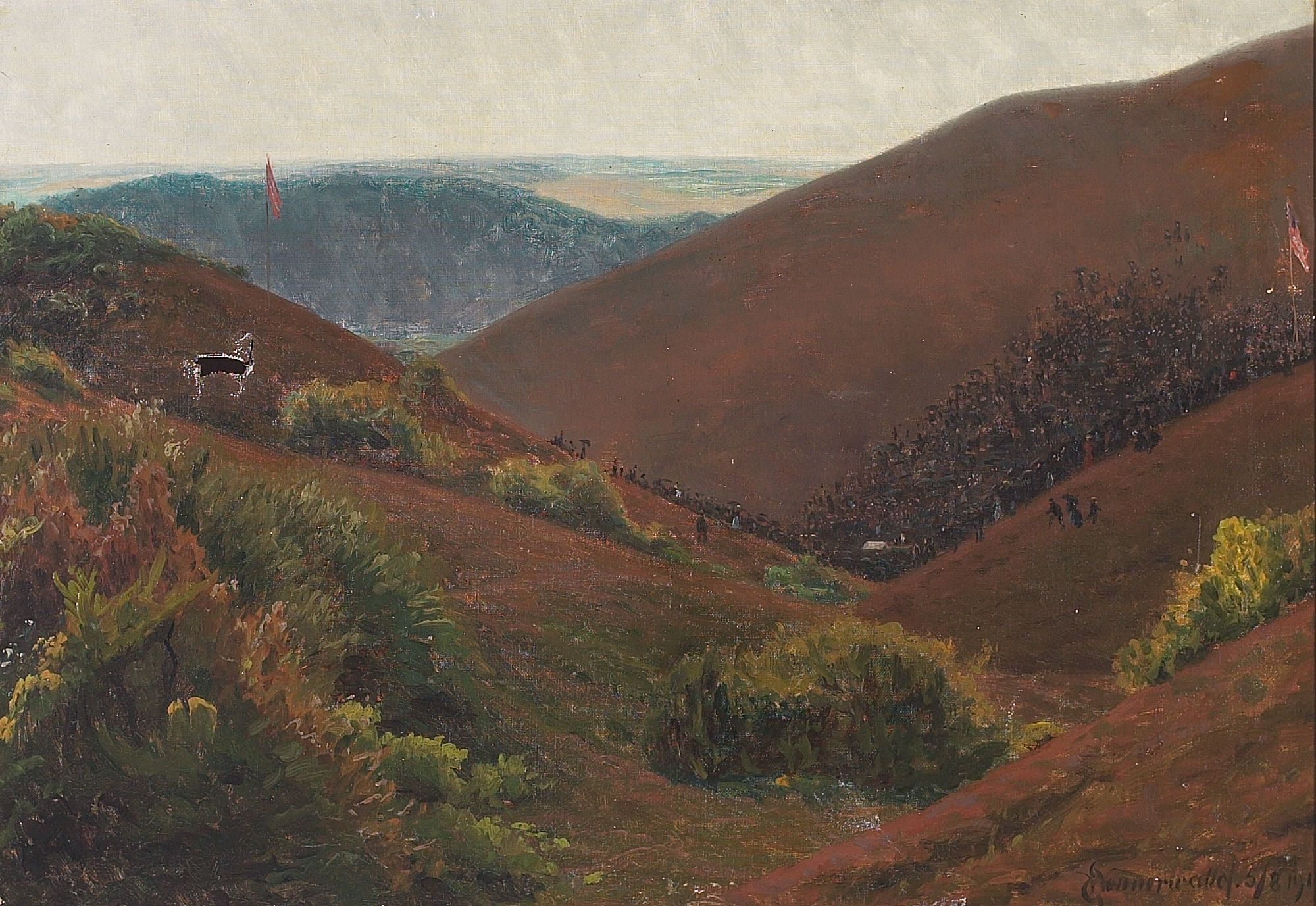
Painting by Emil Wennerwald from the first Rebild Celebration August 5th 1912

Rebild National Park (Danish: Rebild Bakker) is a Danish national park situated near the town of Skørping in Rebild municipality, Region Nordjylland in northern Jutland, Denmark. The idea of arranging an annual gathering for Danish-Americans in a moorland setting in Denmark originated with Danish immigrant Max Henius. Funds were raised by Danish Americans to purchase to 200 acres (0.81 km2) of heather-covered hills and moorland, located within Denmark's largest forest, Rold Forest (Danish: Rold Skov).

When the area for the park was presented to the Danish government, it was specified that the area was to remain in its natural state and be open to the general public throughout the year. Henius also required it to serve as the venue for annual Fourth of July celebrations. Every July 4 since 1912, except during the two world wars and the COVID-19 pandemic, large crowds have gathered in the heather-covered hills of Rebild to celebrate American Independence Day. Due to a period of national mourning caused by King Frederik VIII's sudden death in May 1912, the first Rebild Festival was delayed until August 5. It was attended by somewhere between 10,000 and 15,000 people, including about 1,000 returning emigres to the U.S. Attendance peaked at approximately 50,000 in 1948.

Due to Danish anger over President Donald Trump's attempts to annex Greenland, the 2026 celebration does not include any U.S. officials on the program. Organizers only expect approximately 1,000 attendees.

== Significant speakers ==
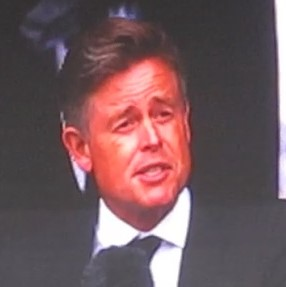
Danish actor Caspar Phillipson, performing as American President John F. Kennedy, gave three of Kennedy's speeches at the Rebild Festival (2022).

Keynote Speakers
Year	Speakers
1929	Th. Stauning
1945	Vilhelm Buhl
1946	Knud Kristensen
1948	Jean Hersholt and Julius Bomholt
1952	Prime Minister Erik Eriksen
1954	Ambassador Henrik Kauffmann
1955	Earl Warren
1956	Actor Ebbe Rode
1959	Minister of Agriculture Karl Skytte
1961	Walt Disney
1962	Richard M. Nixon and King Frederik IX
1963	Dr. Ralph J. Bunche
1967	Walter Cronkite
1969	Hubert H. Humphrey
1970	George W. Romney and Former Minister of Culture Bodil Koch
1971	Raymond Burr
1972	Danny Kaye and Governor Ronald Reagan
1973	Author Piet Hein
1975	Actor Poul Reichhardt
1976	Victor Borge and Queen Margrethe II of Denmark
1978	Dallin H. Oaks and Professor Morten Lange
1979	Lis Hartel
1980	Actor Ove Sprogøe
1981	Pat Boone
1986	Maureen Reagan and Dr. Jørgen Kieler
1987	Victor Borge and Erik Emborg
1988	Dionne Warwick and Hofmarskal Hans Sølvhøj
1990	Richard Chamberlain and Crown Prince Frederik
1991	Garrison Keillor and Minister for Education Bertel Haarder
1993	Richard B. Stone and Prime Minister Poul Nyrup Rasmussen
1994	Attorney General Janet Reno and Princess Benedikte
1995	Senator Sam Nunn and Former Foreign Minister Uffe Ellemann-Jensen
1996	Prince Joachim
1997	Former Prime Minister Poul Schlüter
1999	Governor Charles W. Turnbull and Movie Instructor Bille August
2000	Elder Russell M. Nelson
2001	Tom Lantos, member of the American Congress and President of Parliament Ivar Hansen
2002	Prime Minister Anders Fogh Rasmussen
2003	Senator Bill Nelson, Florida and Foreign Minister Per Stig Møller
2004	Ole Henriksen, Los Angeles, beauty expert and Etta Cameron, gospel singer
2005	Jakob Nielsen, Nielsen Norman Group and Helge Sander, science minister
2007	Former president of Parliament Christian Mejdahl
2008	Mayor of Aalborg Henning G. Jensen
2009	Niels Arden Oplev
2010	Ambassadør Laurie S. Fulton
2011	Congress member Steny Hoyer and Prime Minister Lars Løkke Rasmussen
2012	Actor Keith Carradine and Prime Minister Helle Thorning-Schmidt
2013	Professor Dale T. Mortensen
2014	Model and singer Malena Belafonte
2016	Ambassador Rufus Gifford and Mogens Lykketoft
2017	René Gross Kærskov and Anders Fogh Rasmussen
2018	Ambassador Carla Sands
2022	Ambassador Alan Leventhal and Caspar Phillipson (as John F. Kennedy)
2023	Author/playwright Adam Price and author/bureau chief of The New York Times Elisabeth Bumiller

== See also ==
- Danes Worldwide
- Solvang
