= Madum Lake =

Lake in Rebild Municipality, Denmark

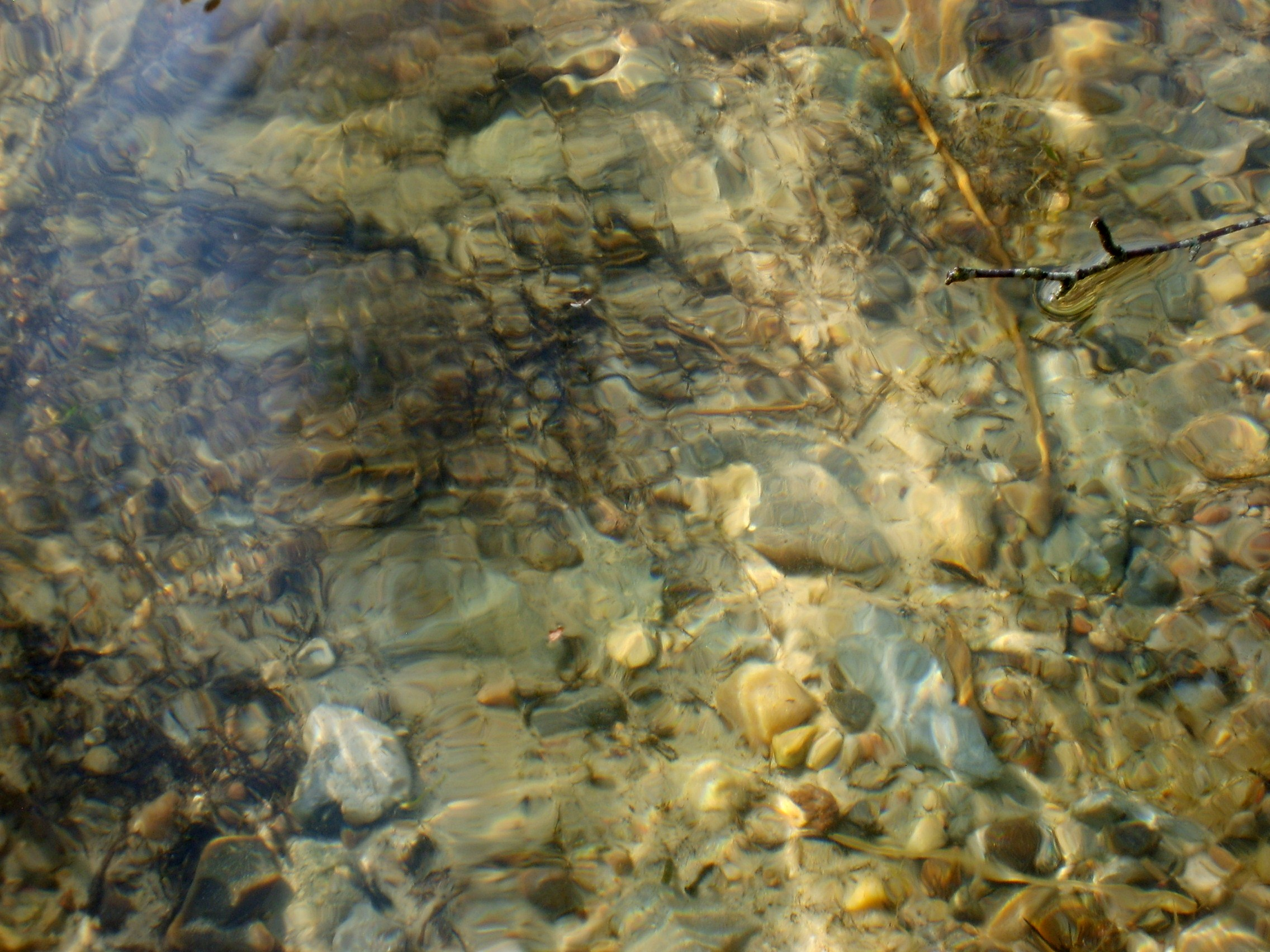
- Water in Madum Lake in 2011. The lake's extremely pure and clear water supports a number of rare aquatic plants, including certain species of Lobelia.

- Location within Denmark
- Location: Rebild Municipality, Mariagerfjord Municipality, Denmark
- Coordinates: 56.037°N 9.79°E
- Type: Kettle hole
- Surface area: 2.04 square kilometres (0.79 mi^{2})
- Average depth: 3 metres (9.8 ft)
- Max. depth: 7.5 metres (25 ft)
- Surface elevation: 36 metres (118 ft)
- Settlements: Skørping, Astrup

Madum Lake (Danish: Madum Sø) is the largest lake in the Himmerland peninsula of Jutland, Denmark. The lake covers an area of 2.04 square kilometres (0.79 sq mi), and has a depth of 7.5 metres (25 ft) at its deepest point. It is both an important bird sanctuary and a popular bathing spot.

== Formation and surroundings ==
Madum Lake most likely developed out of a glacial kettle hole – a hollow formed by the melting of glacial ice left by the Quaternary ice age. The lake formerly lay in heathland, but it is now located in Rebild Municipality, and is surrounded by the Rold Skov forest. To the north of the lake is a narrow forested belt, with birch as the dominant tree species. In the forest, common passerine birds dominate, along with buzzards, goshawks, sparrowhawks, long-eared owls, tawny owls, black woodpeckers, green woodpeckers and ravens. In winter months, whooper swans and merganser ducks can be seen around the lake.

Madum Lake and the surrounding forest are partly owned by three private interests – Lindenborg Gods, Nørlund and Willestrup Estate – with 25% of the forest falling under state ownership. There is public access, and it is possible to walk around the lake on a marked route. Public fishing and boating on the lake is prohibited. At the lake's eastern shore is a visitor parking space, from which extends a marked route to and around the Long Marsh – a large, well-preserved bog in the forest to the east.

== Ecology and conservation ==
Madum Lake is part of a Natura 2000 protected area (no. 18) that also includes the forest of Rold Skov and the river valley of Lindenborg Ådal. The protected area covers a total of 8,748 hectares (87.48 km^{2}), and is also protected under the EU Habitats Directive as a bird sanctuary.

=== Birds ===
Madum Lake is a bird sanctuary of international importance, and is designated as area F3 under the EU Habitats Directive. It serves as a stopover for goldeneye and tufted ducks, and to a lesser extent, mallards. In the spring and autumn, ospreys forage on the lake's population of pike and perch. Madum Lake furthermore serves as an important breeding site for birds, hosting the nests of great crested grebes, mute swans and coots.

=== Threats and concerns ===
Madum Lake has been declared a "Lobelia-lake", after the plant Lobelia dortmanna, indicating very high water quality. However, there is evidence that, in recent years, the ecosystem of the lake has been stressed by outside pollution, including airborne nitrogen from agricultural activities and the more direct influence of hundreds of bathers in summer. A clear sign of this stress is seen in late summer in the form of algal blooms, and the lake's reed-covered headlands have widened in recent years. The lake's waters reportedly remain very clear, but are increasingly acidic and nutrient-poor.
