= Dannie Druehyld =

Danish witch and ecofeminist

- Druehyld in 2008
- Born: 5 Dec 1947; Amager, Denmark
- Died: May 3, 2021 (aged 73); Rold Skov, Denmark
- Occupations: witch; teacher; environmental advocate; feminist

Dannie Druehyld (December 5, 1947 - May 3, 2021) was a Danish witch and ecofeminist who became known for her status as the only registered witch in Denmark. In her youth, she became active in the økofeministerne (ecofeminist) movement, before moving to Rold Skov, where she would go on to live the rest of her life. She also wrote two books, most notably Heksens Håndbog, the Witch's Handbook, which became influential in the 1990s in Denmark.

== Biography ==
She was born in 1947 in Amager to a family without much money. She left home at 15, then went to seminary for two years, before becoming a kindergarten director at 23, the youngest in the country at the time. She was active in the protests against the Vietnam War and the feminist protests, and started forest kindergartens with the help of pensioners and people with mental health challenges.

She co-founded women's land Kvindenlandet in the 1970s. She also co-founded the økofeministerne ("ecofeminist") movement. She later moved to Rold Skov. She published her book, Heksens Håndbog ("Witch's Handbook"), in 1987. It described her rituals and lifestyle, and soon became well known: according to sources, most teenage girls in Denmark in the 1990s would have read the book, or at least heard about it. She also published a second book, Vild Vegetarmad, a guide to collecting and utilizing wild herbs and plants. She was known to have spent a lot of time in the Royal Library, Denmark, researching, and was said to address her folkloric beliefs in an almost scientific manner.

She was known for being the only registered witch in Denmark.

She was featured on TV2/Nord's 2016 show "Is Anyone There?", where she discussed elves and trolls in Rold Skov. She also led tours, including a midsummer tour. She helped establish the Children's Witchcraft Workshop at the Rebild Center.

She died on Monday, May 3, 2021.

Her workshop was recreated for the exhibition "Between Heaven and Earth" at the Royal Library, Denmark. A fundraiser was created after death to preserve a section of Rold Skov and safeguard it from any human impact in her memory. It was ultimately put to use to restore and protect an area with an assortment of springs.
