= Rikke Karlsson =

Danish politician (born 1965)

Rikke Karlsson MEP
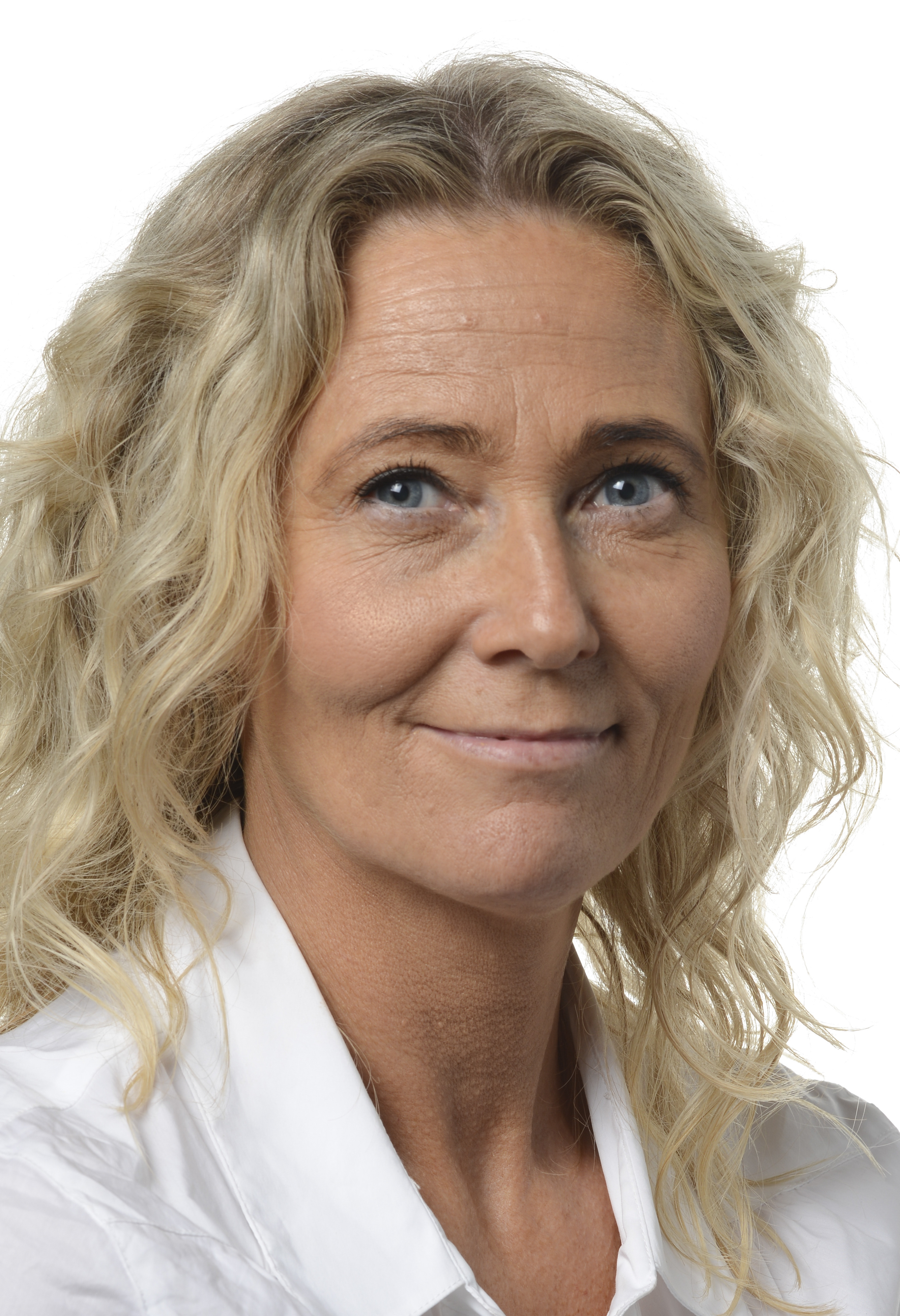

Member of the European Parliament
- In office 1 July 2014 – 2019
- Constituency: Denmark

Personal details
- Born: 29 April 1965 (age 61) Svenstrup, Aalborg, Denmark
- Party: Danish; Independent; EU; ERC

Rikke-Louise Karlsson (born 29 April 1965) is a Danish politician and former Member of the European Parliament (MEP) from Denmark. She is an Independent politician, but she is a member of the European Conservatives and Reformists. She is a former member of the Danish People's Party She is the niece of fellow Danish People's Party politician Søren Espersen. She was elected to the European Parliament (EP) in the 2014 EP election. She was a local politician in Rebild Municipality and North Denmark Region council 2009–2014 and has been a substitute to the Folketing

Karlsson has social pedagogy and has worked as a social worker, teacher, leader of a school for children with special problems and in healthcare sector, including psychiatry.

Elected a member of the municipal council in Rebild in 2009, she was a critic of the municipal authorises in the Rebild-affair where a man had sexually abused nine children, also after concern had been raised to the municipality. Karlsson's involvement in the affair was in the beginning controversial. The affair led to the resignation of four leaders in the municipality.

A candidate to the Folketing in the 2011 election, she was elected first substitute to the parliament. Being a candidate to the European Parliament for the third time in 2014, she was in nominated in second spot at the party's list and was elected with 7,944 preference votes.

Karlsson lives in Støvring and has three children. She is the niece of fellow Danish People's Party politician Søren Espersen.
