= Hydrema =

Danish manufacturing company

Hydrema A/S
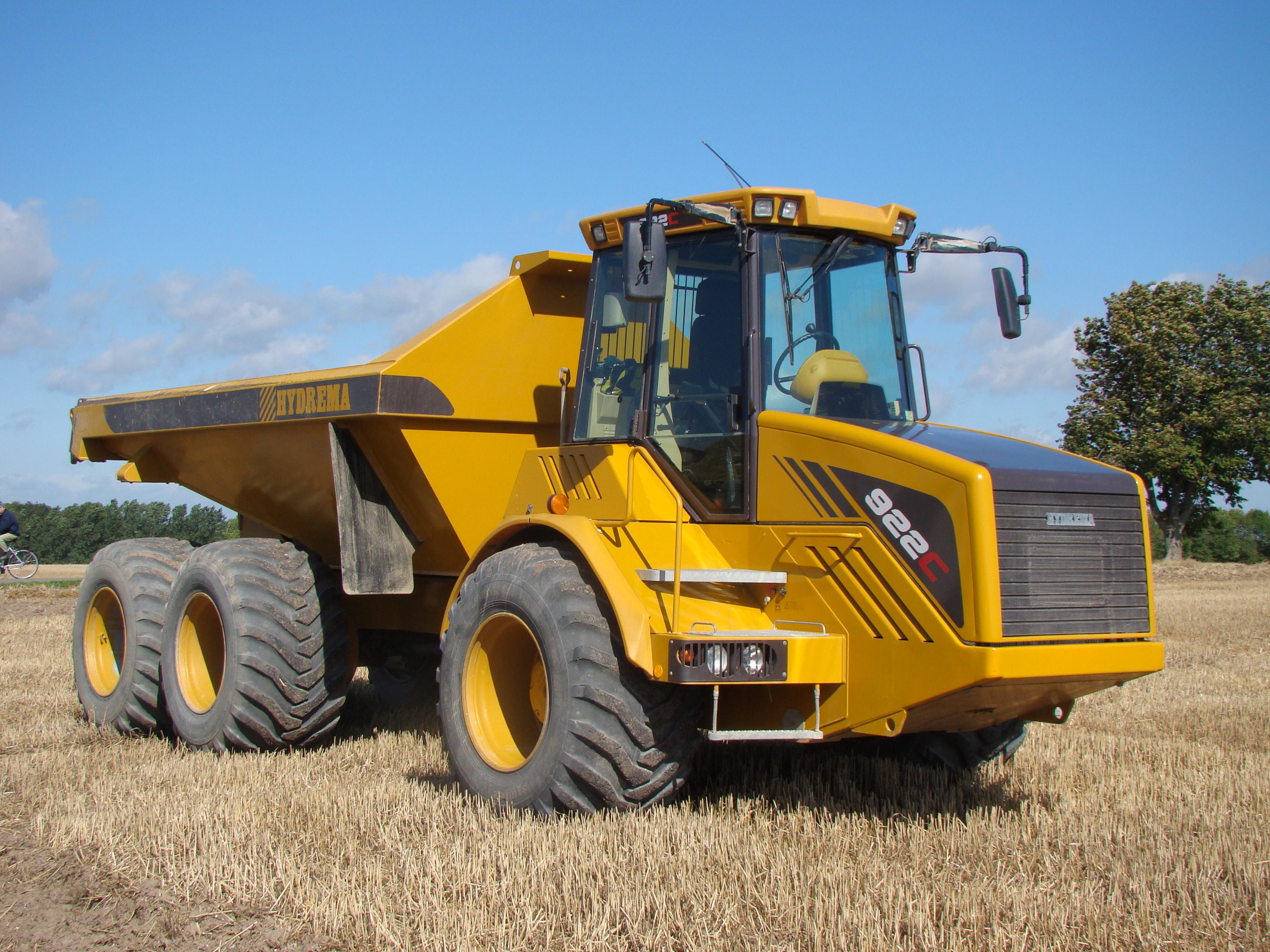
- Company type: Public
- Industry: Earth Moving Equipment
- Founded: 1959
- Headquarters: Støvring, Rebild Municipality, Denmark
- Owner: Founded in 1959 by Kjeld Werner Jensen; Owned since 2000 by Jan Werner Jensen
- Website: Official Website

Hydrema is a manufacturer of earth moving machines based in Støvring, Denmark, founded in 1959. They are specialized in the manufacturing of high-quality machines and earth moving equipment. A variety of models are produced, including dump trucks, backhoe loaders and wheeled excavators, as well as two wheeled excavators and one dump truck for rail road use. Since 1996 they have also produced a mine clearing vehicle.

Hydremas headquarters are based in Støvring, where they have both their administration and a large part of production. Beyond that, Hydrema also has a factory in Weimar, Germany, responsible for a large part of the production as well. Hydrema also has sales- and service facilities in Denmark, Germany, Norway, Sweden, France, United Kingdom, United States, and dealers in 18 other countries.

== History ==
In 1959, Aksel Kyed and Kjeld W. Jensen started the company "Kyed and Werner Jensen", which at that time were involved in two different business areas, district heating and the fabrication of hydraulic digging equipment.

In 1960, the company was split, and Kjeld W. Jensen started Hydrema. Back then the headquarters were placed in Aalborg.

In 1962, the company moved to Støvring. At that time Hydrema had 15 workers and an area of 320 m^{2}.

In 1971, a subsidiary was established in Norway, followed by Sweden in 1979, the former West Germany in 1981, England in 1985 and France in 1988. The United States, Australia, and Poland, are among the countries that import machines from the Hydrema factories in Denmark and from 1997 in Germany.

In 1980, Hydrema started producing their own machines from scratch. They started with the Hydrema 800-series, which were a new line of backhoe loaders produced fully in-house. Except for the engines, made by Perkins Engines in England (Today most machines are fitted with Cummins engines, though). Before 1980, Hydrema bought tractors from companies like Volvo, and mounted their own hydraulic equipment to the tractors.

In 1983, Hydrema started producing their own dump trucks and in a short period in the late 1980s, they also produced mobile building cranes.

In 1990, the Hydrema 800-series were replaced by the Hydrema 900-series, which had a new chassis and more powerful axles and digging arm (backhoe).

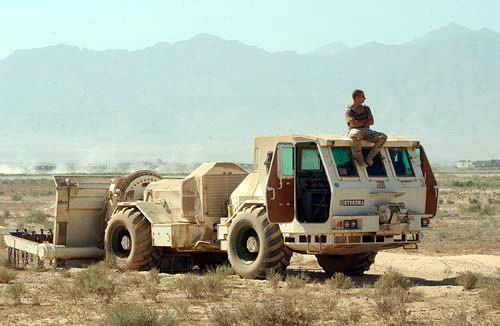
Hydrema mine clearing vehicle

In 1996, Hydrema started the production of a new mine clearing vehicle, named the Hydrema MCV 910. It can safely clear big mine areas in a short amount of time.

In 1997, Hydrema bought the Weimar-Werk Baumaschinen, and thereby acquired production facilities in Germany. In Støvring, the production and administration area is about 16.500 m^{2}, while the facilities in Weimar are 20.000 m^{2}.

In 1998, Hydrema launched their unique Hydrema MPV 900. It was a Multi Purpose Vehicle, which was able to switch tools, like a telescopic arm or a digging arm.

In 2004, Hydrema mine-clearing vehicle (MCV) was used by the Indian Army for 'proving' operations to clear personnel or anti-tank mines with up to 10 kg explosive weight.

In 2006, Hydrema expanded into the defence industry through a counter purchasing deal with the Swedish Hägglunds, which is a part of BAE Systems. Hydrema was to produce, mount and integrate 45 turrets for the Danish Army's new CV9035 Infantry Fighting Vehicle.

== Products ==
Dump Trucks:

- Hydrema DT6
- Hydrema 707G
- Hydrema 707G Power+
- Hydrema 912G
- Hydrema 912GS
- Hydrema 912HM
- Hydrema 922G
- Hydrema 922GS
- Hydrema 922G 2.55
- Hydrema 922HM

Backhoe Loaders:

- Hydrema 906G
- Hydrema 908G
- Hydrema 926G
- Hydrema 928G

Wheeled Excavators:

- Hydrema MX14G
- Hydrema MX16G
- Hydrema MX17G
- Hydrema MX18G
- Hydrema MX20G

Rail:

Rail Exacavators:

- Hydrema MX16G Rail
- Hydrema MX20G Rail

Rail Dump Truck:

- Hydrema 912GS Rail

Defence:

- Hydrema 910MCV mine clearing vehicle
