= Nørager Municipality =

Nørager Municipality Nørager Kommune
- Former municipalities of Denmark
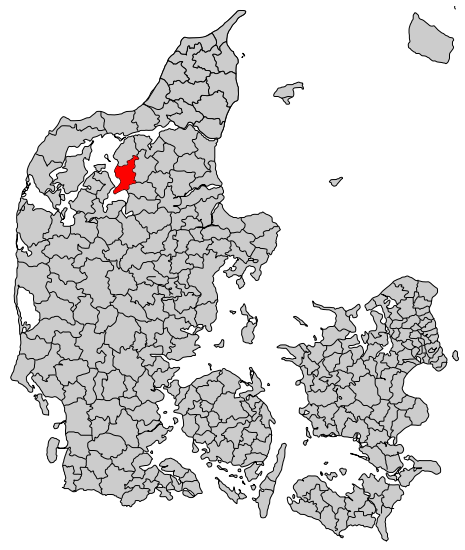
- Coordinates: 56.7°N 9.61667°E
- Country: Denmark
- Region: Region of North Jutland
- Seat: Nørager

Government
  - Mayor: Poul Larsen (Last)

Area
  - Total: 628 km^{2} (242 sq mi)

Population (2005)
  - Total: 5,565
  - Density: 8.86/km^{2} (23.0/sq mi)
- Time zone: UTC1 (CET)
  - Summer (DST): UTC2 (CEST)

Nørager Municipality is a former municipality (Danish, kommune) in Region Nordjylland on the Jutland peninsula in northern Denmark. The former Nørager municipality covered an area of 168 km^{2} (65 sq mi), and had a total population of 5,565 (2005). Its last mayor was Poul Larsen, a member of the Conservative People's Party (Det Konservative Folkeparti) political party.

On 1 January 2007 Nørager municipality ceased to exist as the result of Kommunalreformen ("The Municipality Reform" of 2007). It was merged with Skørping and Støvring municipalities to form the new Rebild Municipality. This created a municipality with an area of 628 km^{2} (242 sq mi) and a total population of 28,457 (2005).

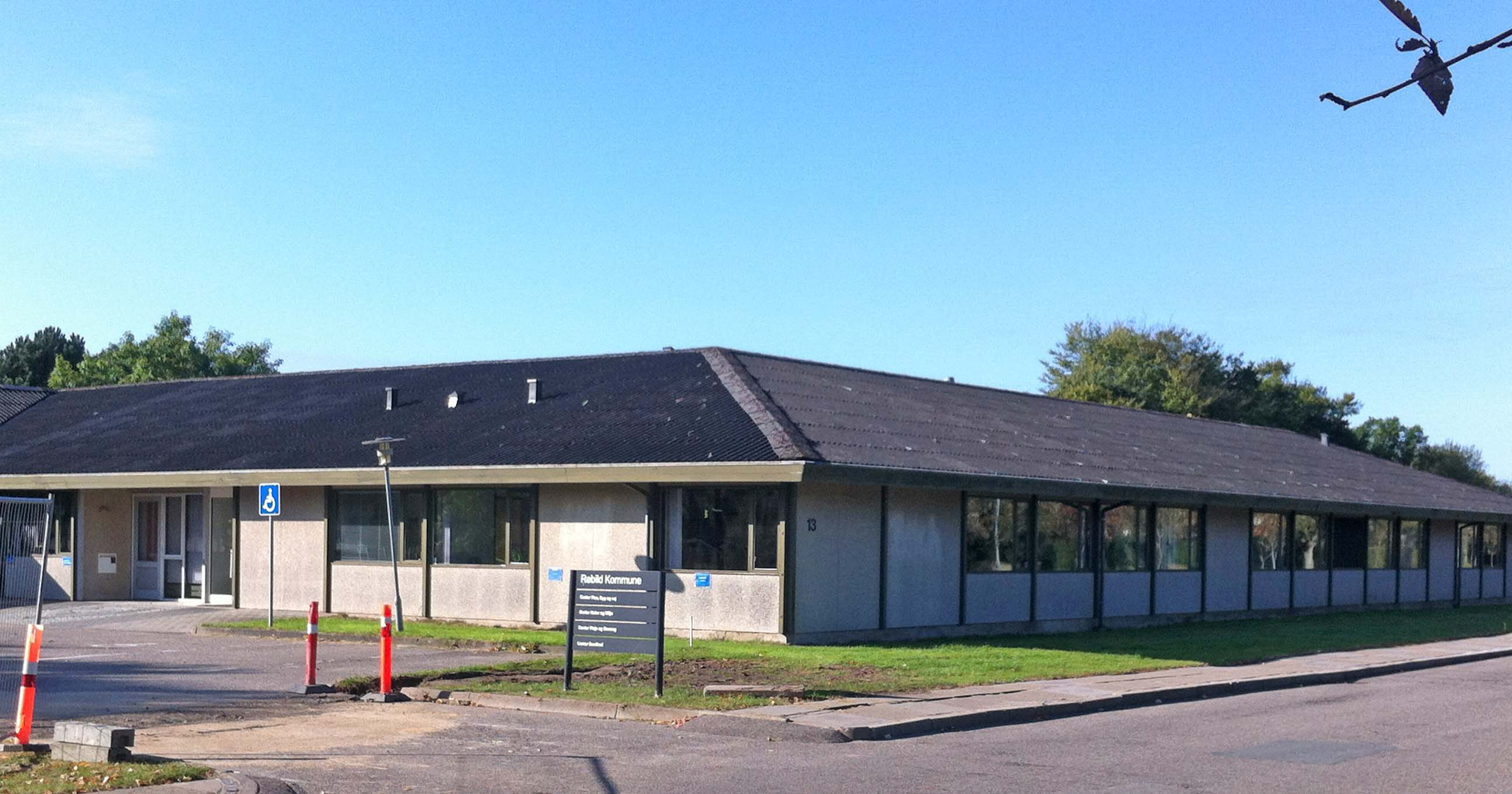
Municipality office in Nørager

== Mayors of Nørager ==
Name	Party	Time
Ernst Wadgaard	Venstre	1970 - 1978
Niels Juel Jensen	Venstre	1978 - 1990
Jens Ove Hansen	Venstre	1990 - 1998
Poul Larsen	Konservative	1998 - 2007
