= Bælum =

- Village
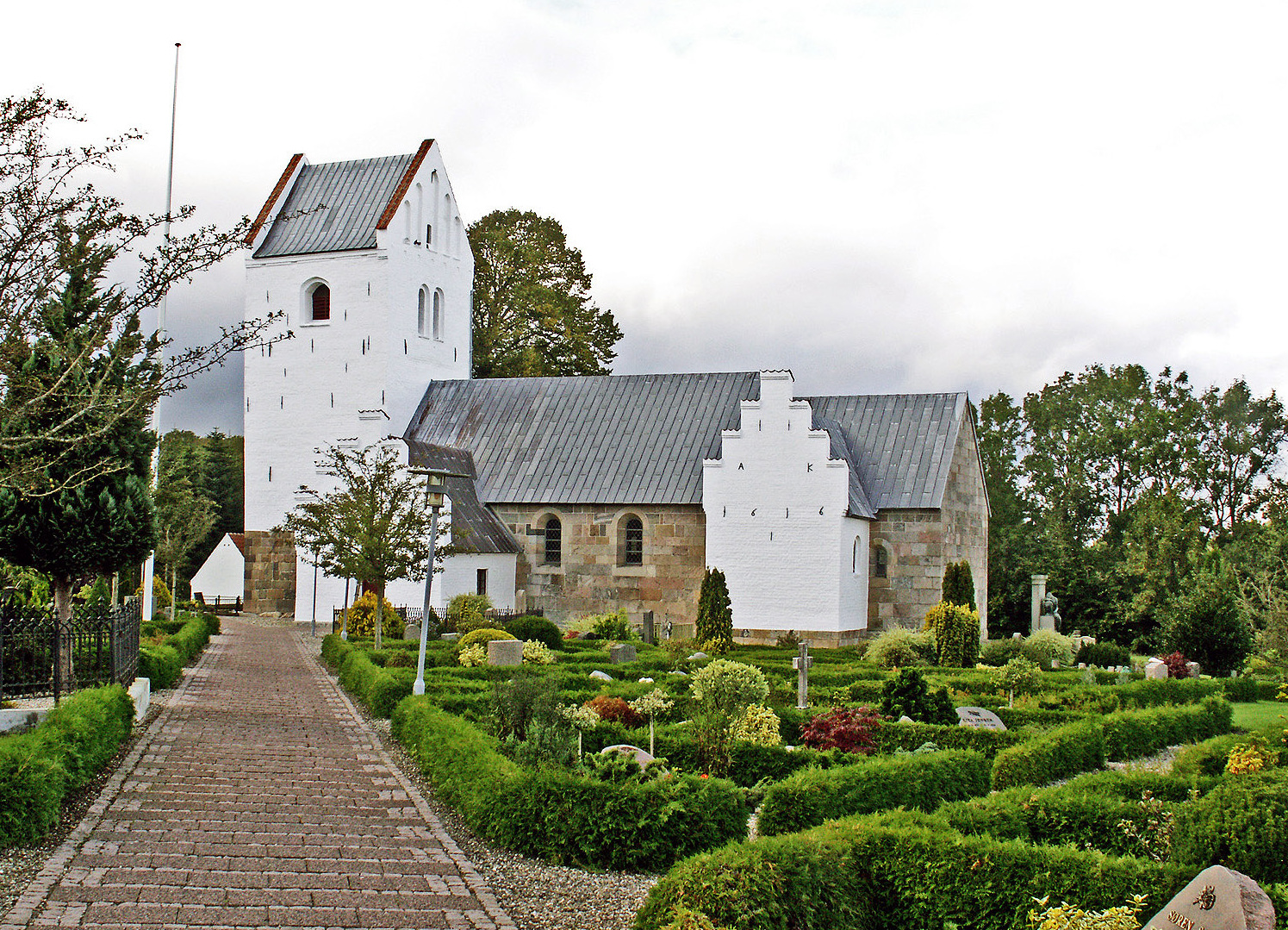
- Bælum Church

- Location in North Denmark Region Bælum (Denmark)
- Coordinates: 56.83116°N 10.11879°E
- Country: Denmark
- Region: North Jutland Region
- Municipality: Rebild Municipality

Population (2026)
  - Total: 702
- Time zone: UTC+1 (CET)
  - Summer (DST): UTC+2 (CEST)

Bælum is a village, with a population of 702 (1 January 2026), in Rebild Municipality, North Jutland Region in Denmark. It is located 31 km southeast of Aalborg, 16 km north of Hadsund and 5 km northeast of Terndrup.

Bælum Church is located in the village and Bælum Mill on the northwestern outskirts of the village. The wind turbine and the motor house have been fully restored and are maintained by Bælum Møllelaug.
