= Rebild National Park =

Nature park in Denmark

Coordinates: 56.832°N 9.84209°E

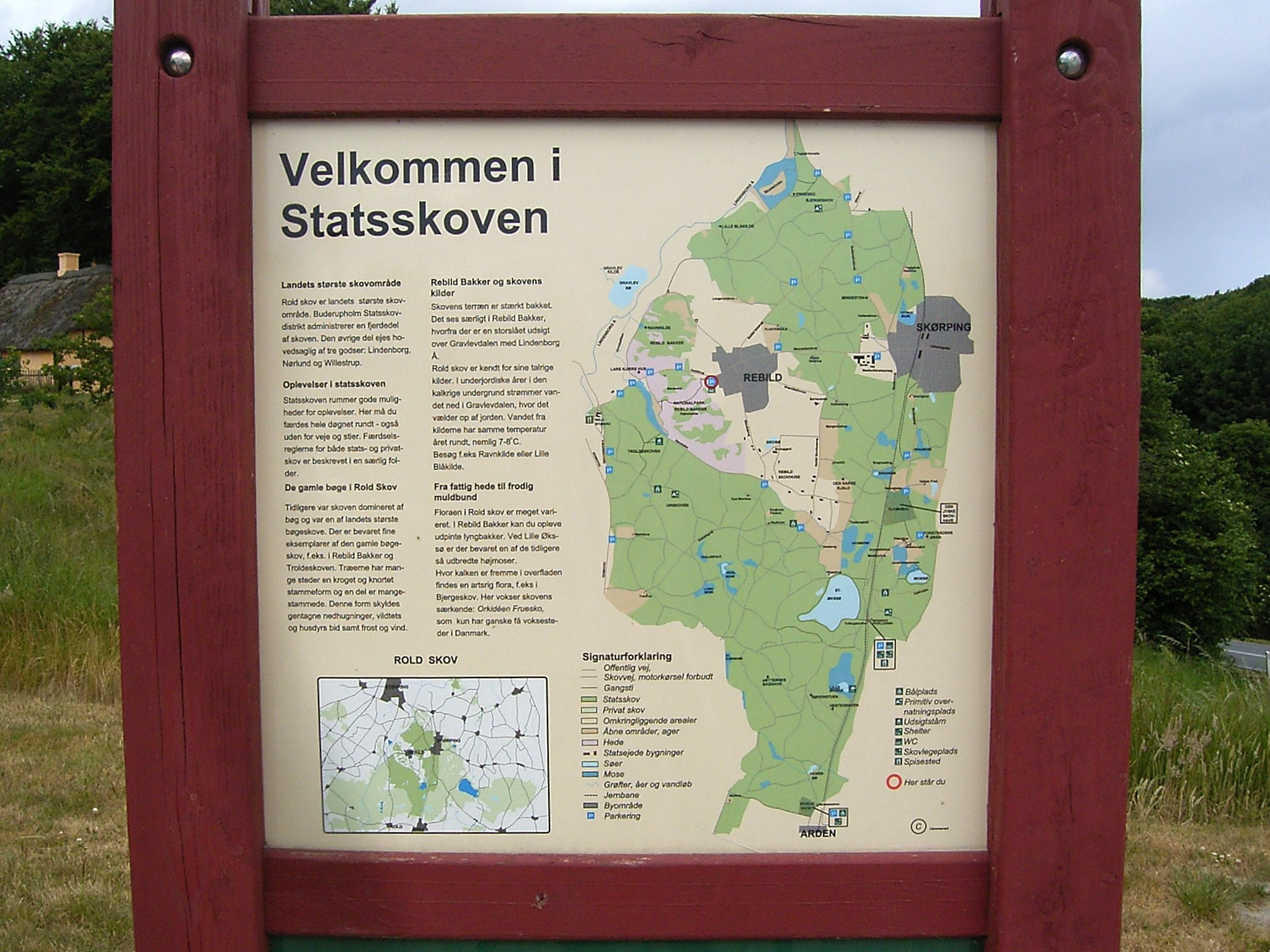
Rebild National Park map

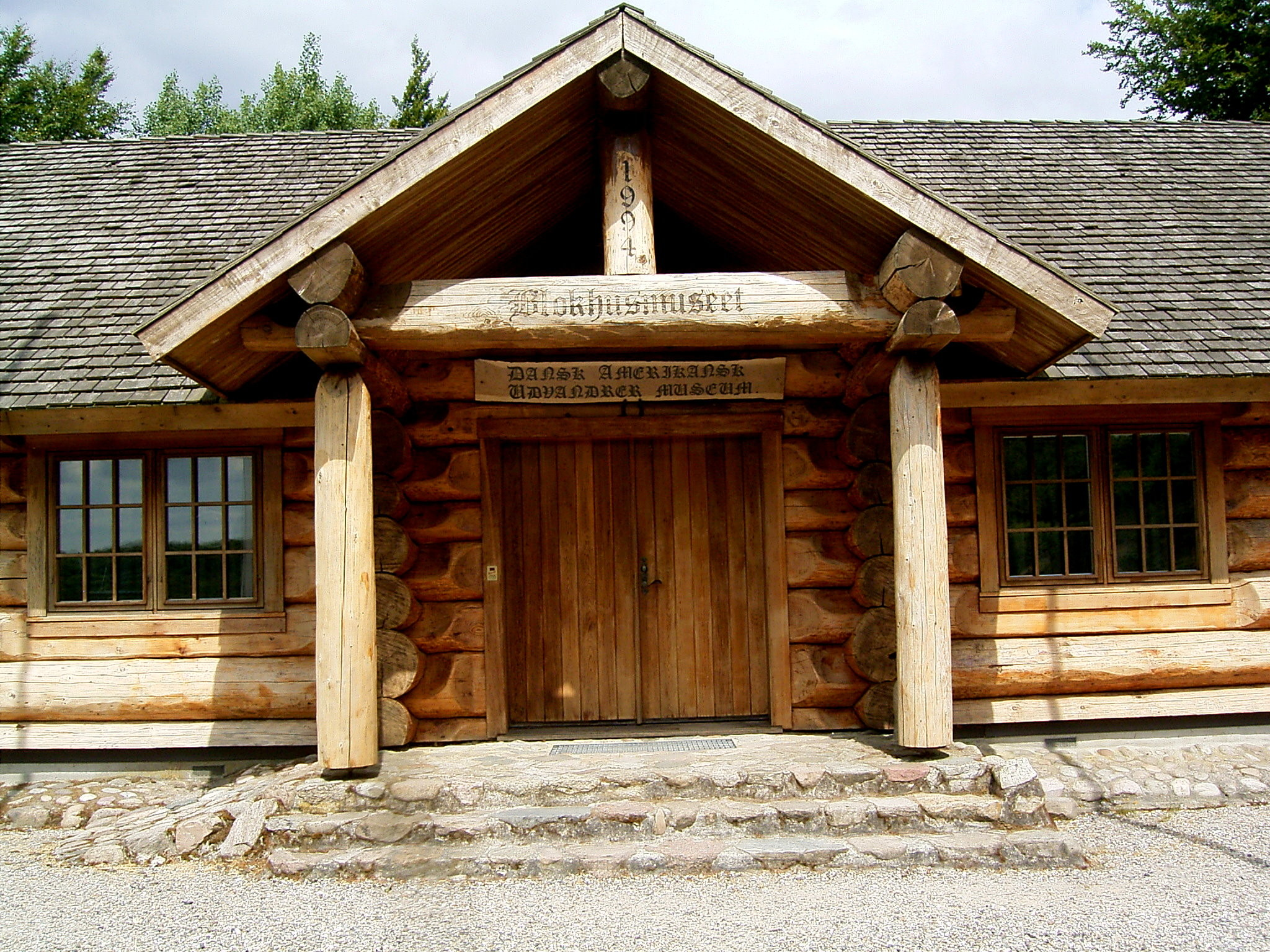
Rebild National Park log cabin

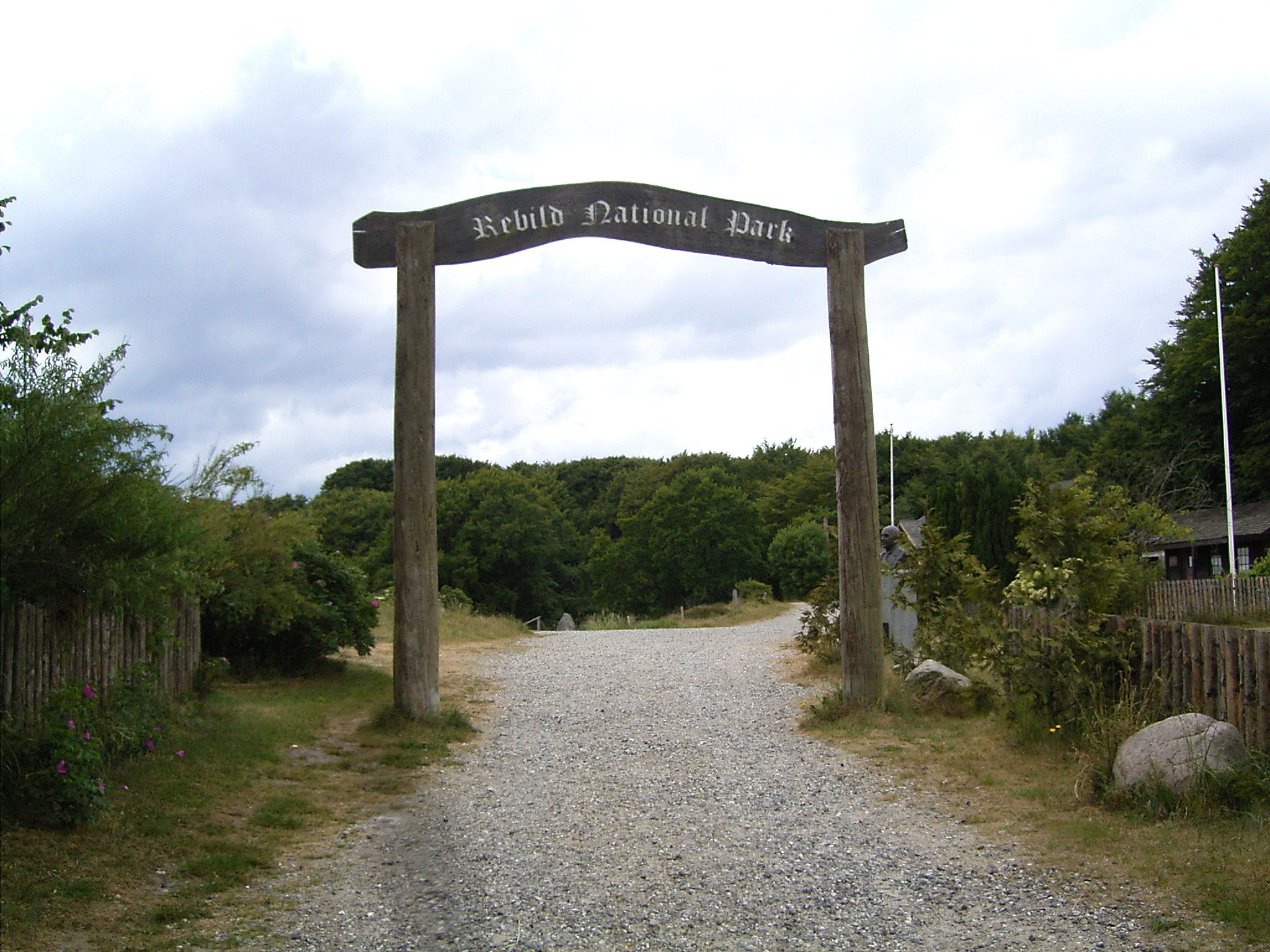
Rebild National Park entrance

Rebild National Park (Danish: Rebild Bakker) is a protected area located in Rebild municipality in Region Nordjylland in Denmark.

The park comprises a hilly heathland south of the small town of Rebild, situated in the geographic region of the Himmerland on the peninsula of Jutland. The forest of Rold Skov surrounds the hills on three sides, but the heathland is to be protected in its natural state. The Rebild Festival is held in the national park every 4 July.

Rebild National Park is not included in the Danish National Park laws of 2007, but the heath is still to be protected and it can use the name National Park nonetheless. The park is one of two original national parks in Denmark, the other one being 'National Park Dybbøl Skanser' from 1924, now called 'Historiecenter Dybbøl Banke' (English: Dybbøl Banke Museum and History Centre).

Rebild Bakker houses a number of museums.

== History ==
The heaths of Rebild Hills (Danish: Rebild Bakker) was previously owned and used by the local peasants as pastures for their cattle, but it was bought up in the year 1911 and presented as a gift to the state of Denmark, to be administered on certain conditions (stipulations).

The founder of the Rebild National Park was Dr. Max Henius, a Danish-American who emigrated to the United States in 1881 and settled in Chicago. In 1911, almost 200 acres (0.81 km^{2}) of the hilly countryside were bought with funds raised by Danish Americans. One of the Chicago-based Danish Americans included Jens Peder Poulsen Fuglsang, born in Virring Denmark in 1871. In 1912, Max Henius (accompanied by Fuglsang, whose name in Danish means "birdsong") presented the deed to the land to his Majesty King Christian X as a permanent memorial to Danish Americans. Sadly, Fuglsang died at sea aboard the ocean liner SS Oscar II on his return trip to America in August 1912. Later the Danish government added to the land.

In 1925, Mindeparken was inaugurated in the city of Aarhus by King Christian X and it was planned to celebrate the Danish-American gatherings as well as visiting Danish citizens living abroad there. As the Rebild Festival gained momentum, Mindeparken was dropped and used for other purposes.

== Current activities ==
Rebild National Park also houses an annual Christmas market on Advent Sunday with around 5,000 visitors.

== Other Sources ==
- Rebild Bakker Himmerland Danish Nature Agency.
- The springs in Rebild Bakker Naturturist Nordjylland (in Danish)
- VisitRebild (in Danish)
