= Blenstrup =

- Village
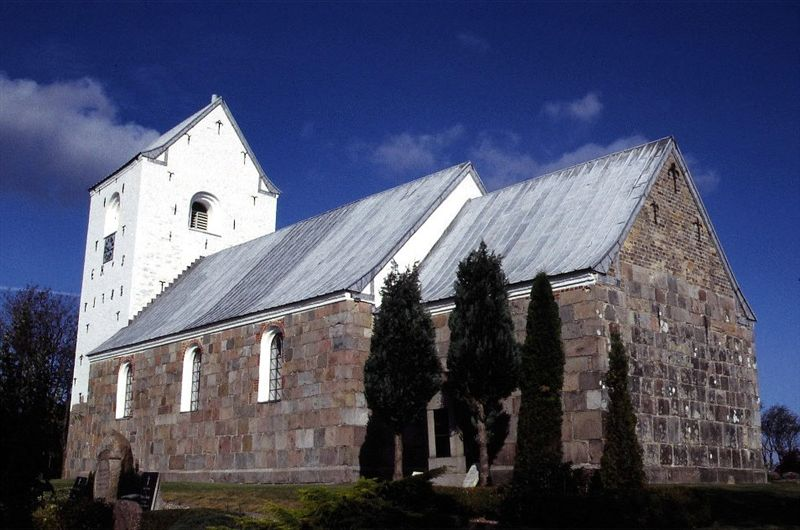
- Blenstrup Church

- Location in North Jutland Region Blenstrup (Denmark)
- Coordinates: 56°52′48″N 10°0′46″E
- Country: Denmark
- Region: Nordjylland
- Municipality: Rebild Municipality

Population (2026)
  - Total: 460

Blenstrup, is a village with a population of 460 (1 January 2026) located about 25 km south of Aalborg, near the main road between Aalborg and Hadsund. It was a part of the former Skørping Municipality, but after Kommunalreformen ("The Municipal Reform" of 2007), it is now part of the new Rebild Municipality.
