= Haverslev =

- Village
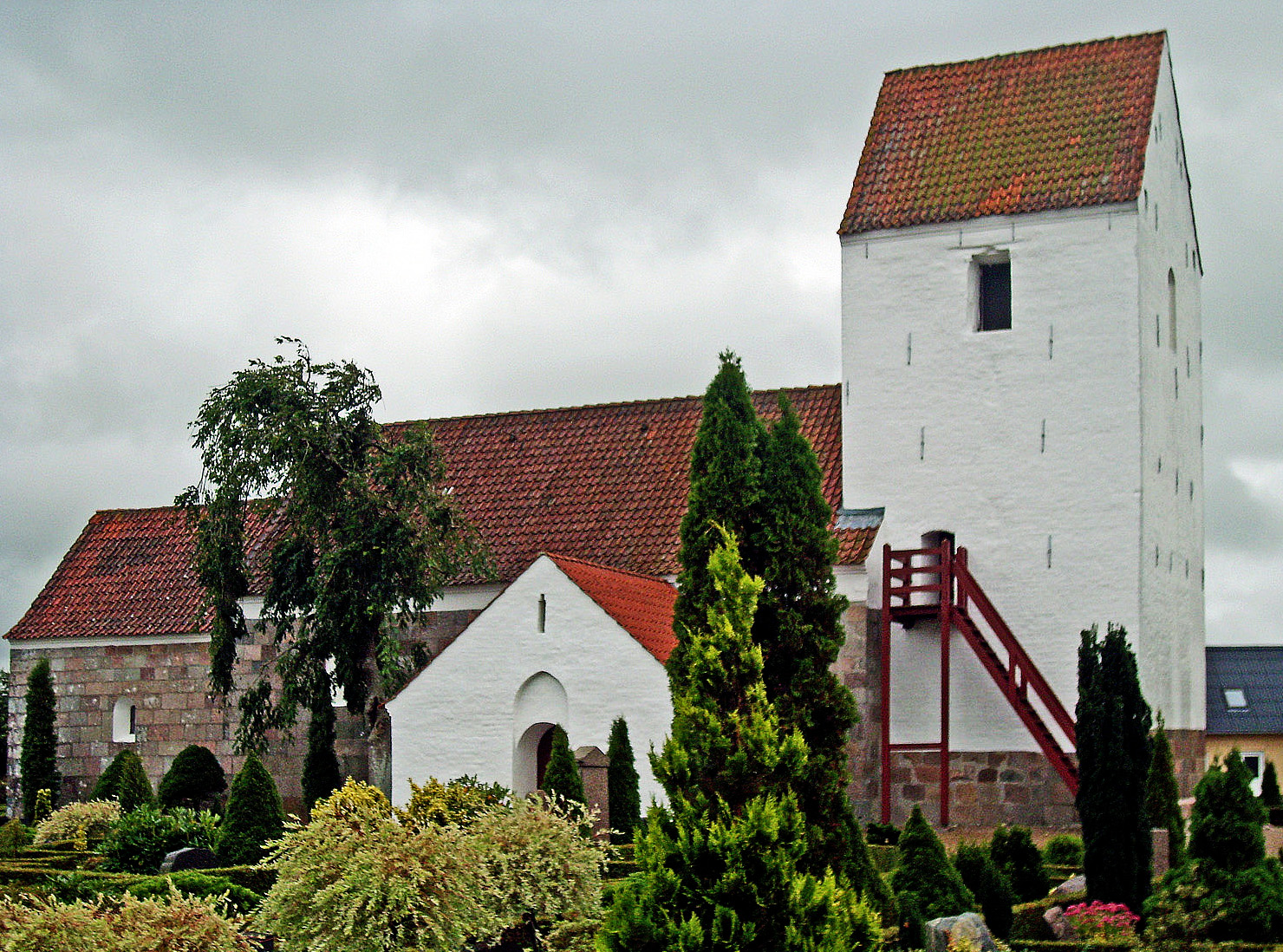
- Haverslev Church

- Location within North Jutland Region Location within Denmark
- Coordinates: 56°47′14″N 9°41′8″E
- Country: Denmark
- Region: North Jutland Region
- Municipality: Rebild Municipality

Population (2026)
  - Total: 822

Haverslev is a village, with a population of 822 (1 January 2026), in Rebild Municipality, North Jutland Region in Denmark. It is located 11 km east of Aars, 14 km south of Støvring, 11 km west of Arden and 10 km north of Nørager

Haverslev Church is located in the village.
