= TV2/Nord =

- Country: Denmark
- Broadcast area: Northern Jutland; Faroe Islands; Greenland
- Headquarters: Aabybro

Programming
- Language(s): Danish

Ownership
- Owner: TV 2

History
- Launched: April 1, 1989

Links
- Website: tv2nord.dk

TV2/Nord is one of TV 2's eight regional services. The service's headquarters are in Aabybro although it has had previous offices in Frederikshavn, Hjørring and Hobro. The station broadcasts news and other content. It broadcasts to people in the northern part of Jutland, Greenland and in the Faroe Islands. Content is also produced by TV2/Nord.

The station was involved in a pioneering DTT experiment in 2002.

== See also ==
- TV 2
