= Nørager =

- Town
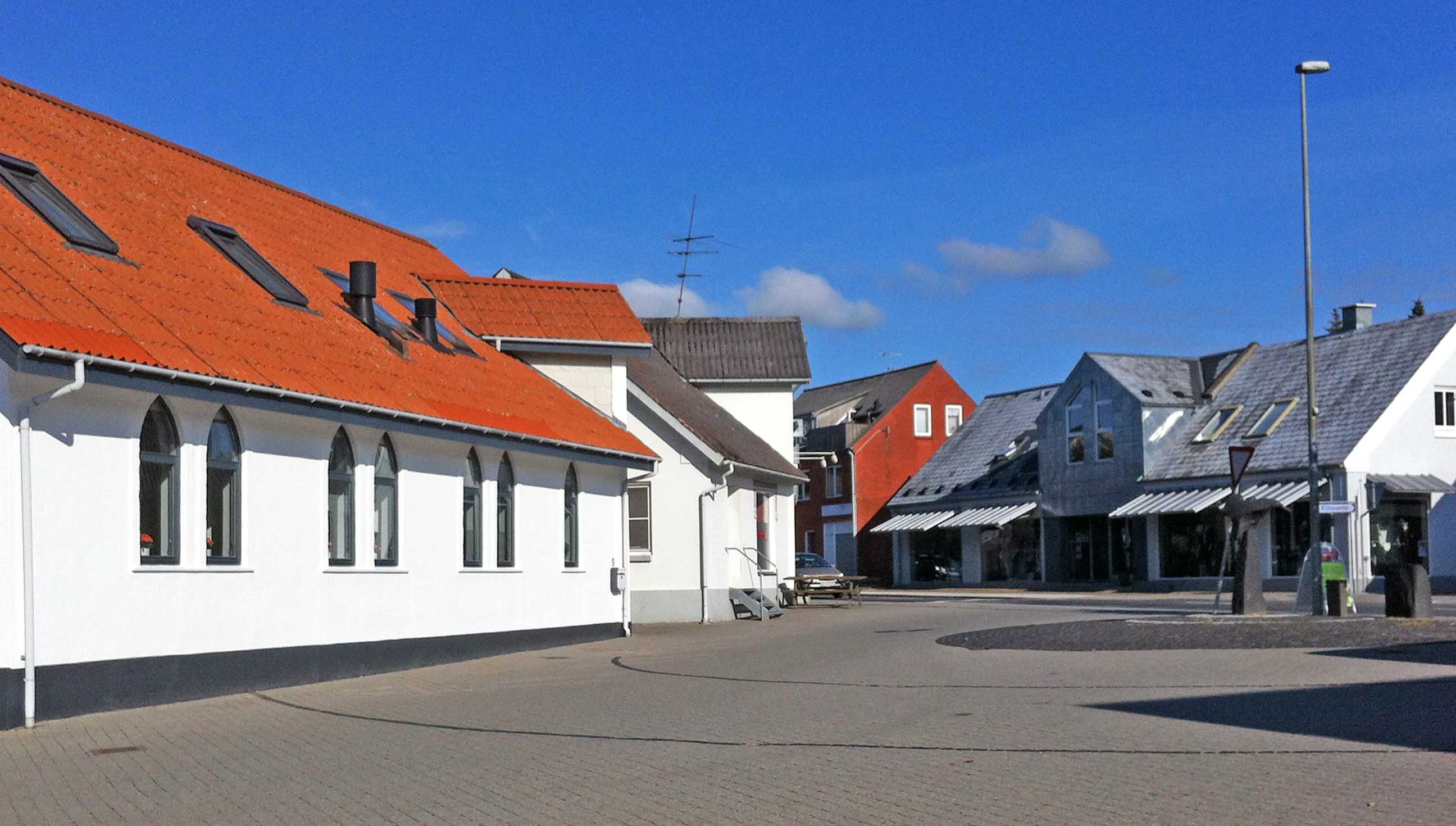
- The center of Nørager.

- Location in Denmark
- Coordinates: 56°42′25″N 9°37′50″E
- Country: Denmark
- Region: Region Nordjylland
- Municipality: Rebild
- Foundation: 1891

Area
  - Urban: 1.0 km^{2} (0.39 sq mi)

Population (2026)
  - Urban: 1,178
  - Urban density: 1,200/km^{2} (3,100/sq mi)
- Time zone: UTC+1 (CET)
  - Summer (DST): UTC+1 (CEST)
- Postal code: DK-9610 Nørager
- Website: www.rebild.dk

Nørager (Danish pronunciation: [ˈnɶɐ̯ˌɛˀjɐ]) is a town with a population of 1,178 (1 January 2026) in Rebild municipality in Region Nordjylland on the Jutland peninsula in northern Denmark. It is the former municipal seat of Nørager Municipality. Nørager is located 15 km from Aars and 26 km from Støvring which is the municipal seat of Rebild Municipality that Nørager now is a part of.

== History ==
In the town lies the manor house Nøragergård, which has been known since the Middle Ages. The farm burned in 2005 and was rebuilt in 2011. After that, Nørager inn is now the oldest standing building in Nørager since it was built in 1891, since there is no church in the town itself.

Nørager had a station on the line Hobro-Aalestrup (1893-1966), which was part of the Himmerlands runways. The station was a little northwest of Nøragergård. In addition to a circulation track there was a loading trail at each end of the station. Nørager Station was still in use in 1966. After closure, it served as a post office and bus service. The warehouse was demolished in 1982 and the rest of the station on Jernbanegade 9 was demolished in 2016 to accommodate a new municipal administration building.

== Nørager Municipality ==
The former Nørager municipality covered an area of 168 km^{2} (65 sq mi), and had a total population of 5,565 (2005). Its last mayor was Poul Larsen, a member of the Conservative People's Party (Det Konservative Folkeparti) political party.

On 1 January 2007 Nørager municipality ceased to exist as the result of Kommunalreformen ("The Municipality Reform" of 2007). It was merged with Skørping and Støvring municipalities to form the new Rebild Municipality. This created a municipality with an area of 628 km^{2} (242 sq mi) and a total population of 28,457 (2005).

== Notable people ==
- Carl Emil Moltke (1773–1858) a Danish diplomat and landowner, owned Nørager from 1837
- Søren Søndergaard (born 1966 in Nørager) a Danish former professional boxer, competed at the 1988 Summer Olympics
