= Øster Hornum =

- Town
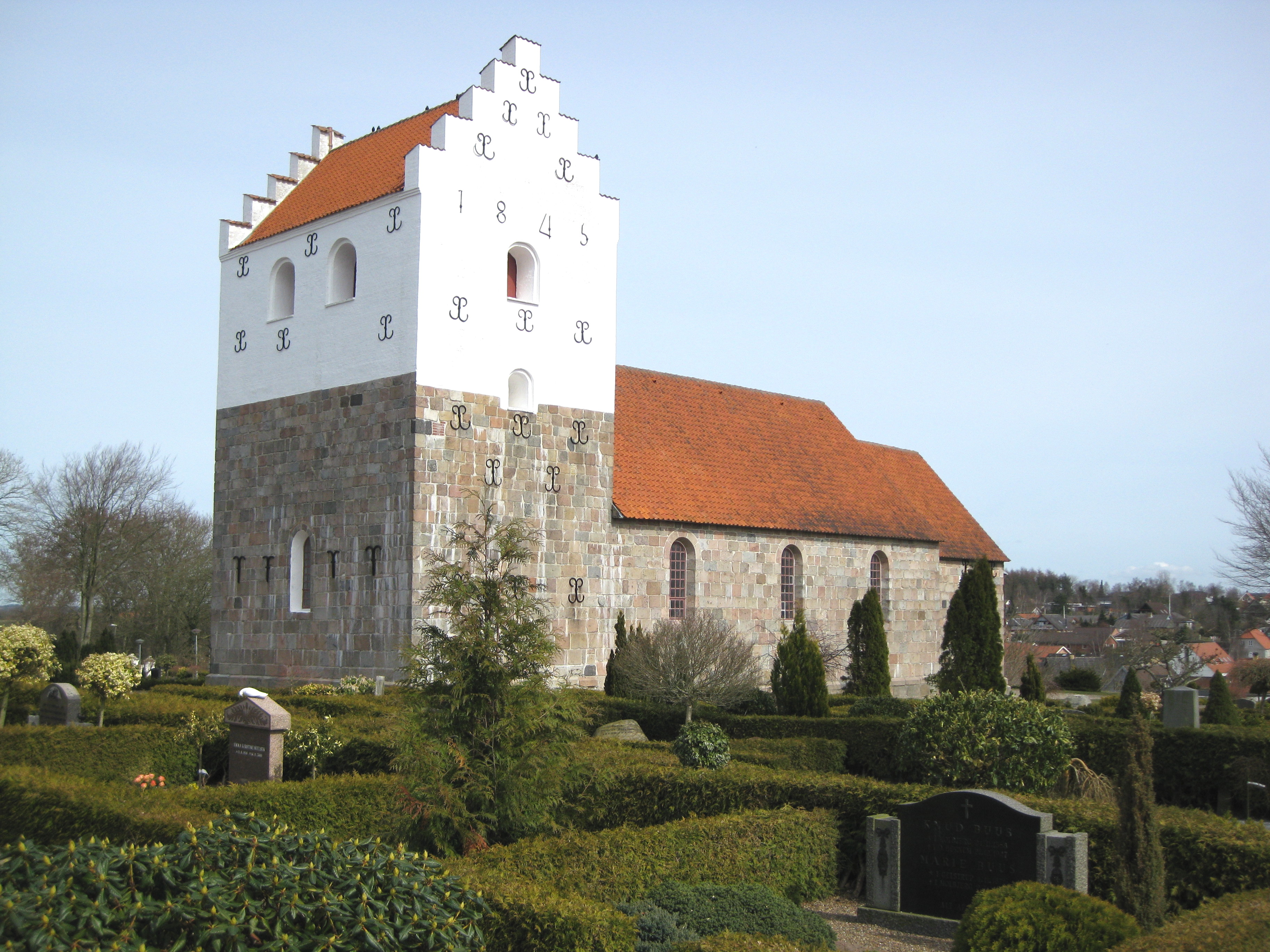
- Øster Hornum Church

- Location in Denmark Øster Hornum (North Jutland Region)
- Coordinates: 56°56′9″N 9°45′17″E
- Country: Denmark
- Region: North Jutland Region
- Municipality: Rebild Municipality

Area
  - Urban: 0.7 km^{2} (0.27 sq mi)

Population (2026)
  - Urban: 1,070
  - Urban density: 1,500/km^{2} (4,000/sq mi)
- Time zone: UTC+1 (CET)
  - Summer (DST): UTC+2 (CEST)
- Postal code: DK-9530 Støvring

Øster Hornum is a small town, with a population of 1,070 (1 January 2026), in Rebild Municipality, North Jutland Region in Denmark. It is located 18 km southwest of Aalborg.

Øster Hornum Church is located on the western outskirts of the town.
