= Terndrup =

- Town
- Location in Denmark Terndrup (North Jutland Region)
- Coordinates: 56°48′49″N 10°03′36″E
- Country: Denmark
- Region: North Jutland Region
- Municipality: Rebild Municipality

Area
  - Urban: 1.3 km^{2} (0.50 sq mi)

Population (2026)
  - Urban: 1,669
  - Urban density: 1,300/km^{2} (3,300/sq mi)
- Time zone: UTC+1 (CET)
  - Summer (DST): UTC+2 (CEST)
- Postal code: DK-9575 Terndrup

Terndrup is a town, with a population of 1,669 (1 January 2026) in Rebild Municipality, North Jutland Region in Denmark. It is located 32 km south of Aalborg, 12 km north of Hadsund and 10 km east of Skørping.

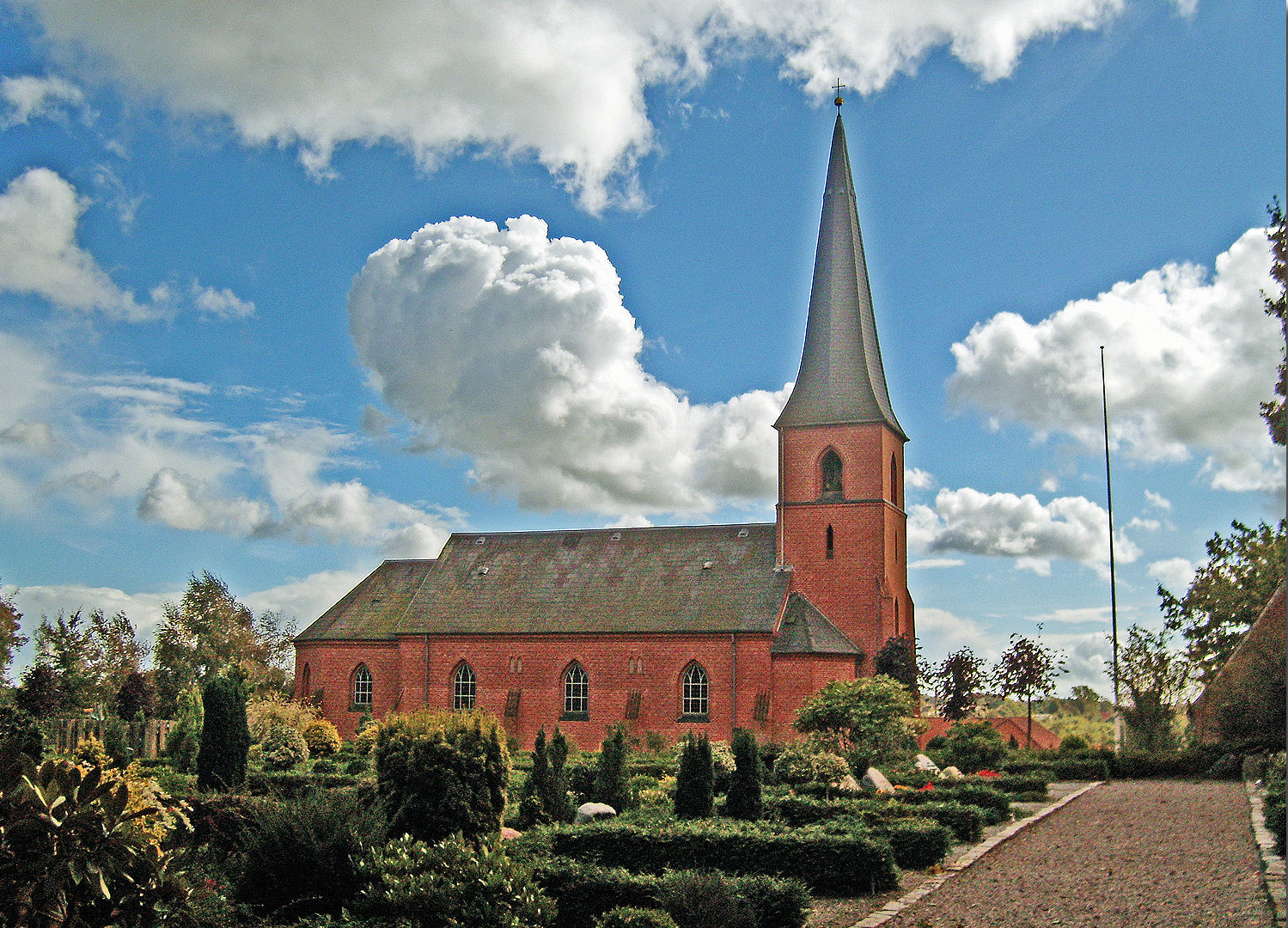
Terndrup Church

Terndrup Church, built in 1901 in a neo-Gothic style, is located in the town.
