= Ravnkilde =

Coordinates: 56°45′N 9°46′E

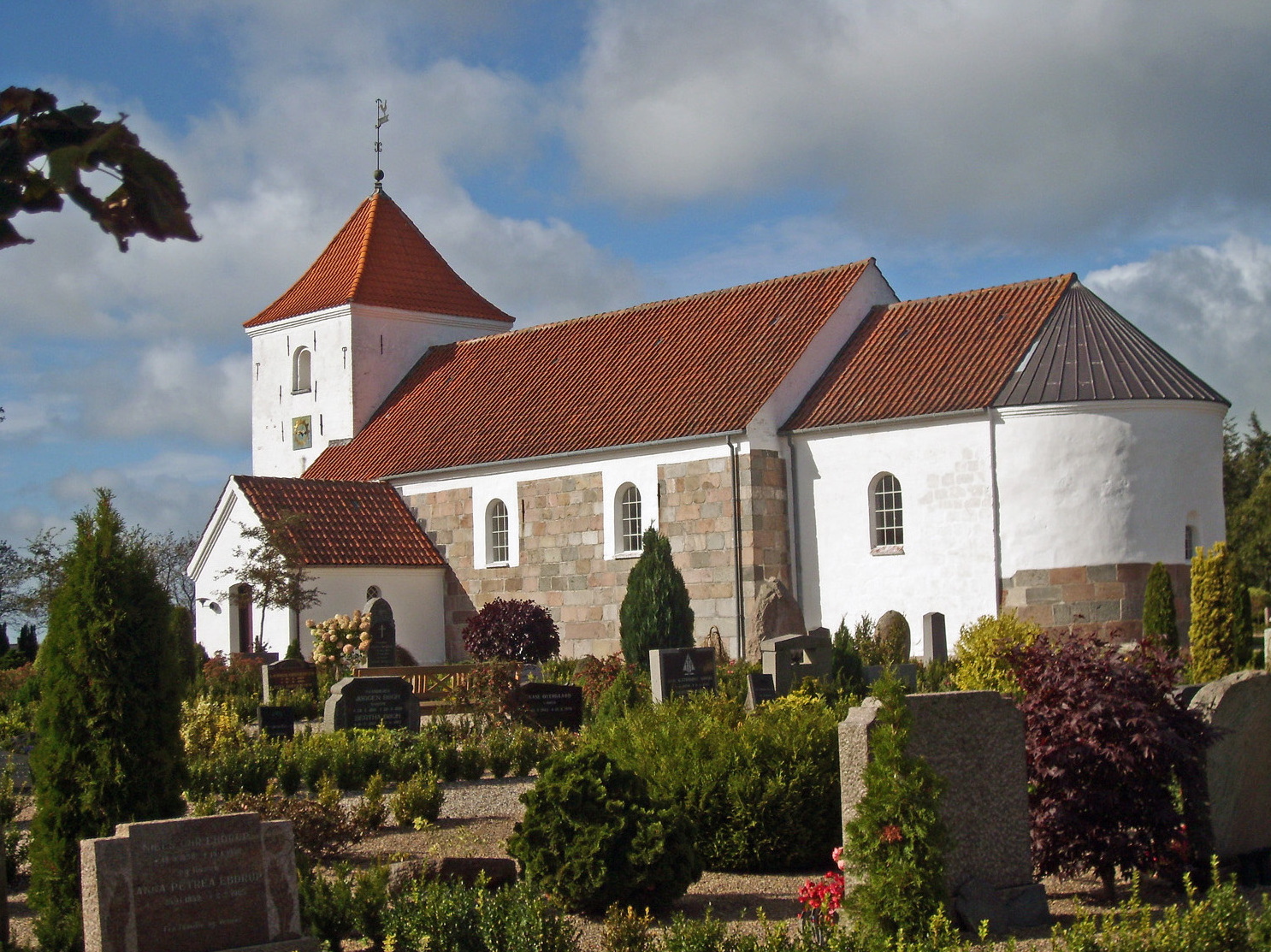
Ravnkilde church

Ravnkilde is a small countryside town in Denmark with a population of 312 (1 January 2026), located in Rebild Municipality, North Jutland Region.
