= Rold Skov =

Forest in Himmerland, Denmark

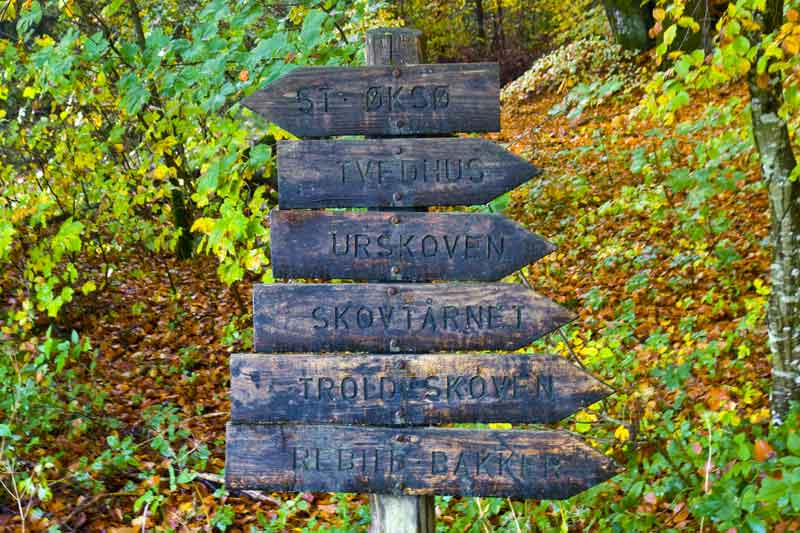
- Road sign in Rold Skov.

- Location within Denmark

Geography
- Location: Rebild, Mariagerfjord, Denmark
- Coordinates: 56°48′N 9°49′E
- Area: 80 km^{2} (31 sq mi)

Ecology
- WWF Classification: Baltic mixed forests

Rold Skov (Rold Forest) is a forest in Himmerland, Denmark. At 8,000 ha (19700 acres), it is the second largest forest in the country, after the Silkeborg Forests.

The forest is named after the village of Rold which lies in the southern outskirt of the forest. Other towns in Rold Skov include Arden, Rebild, and Skørping.

== Description ==
Rold Skov comprises several distinct areas and woodlands in a very hilly terrain, giving rise to a number of springs (Lille Blåkilde, Ravnkilde, Gravlevkilden, Egebækkilden), streams and lakes such as Madum Lake, Økssø, Mossø, and the newly restored Gravlev Lake. Rebild National Park, a natural site consisting of heather-covered hills, is located in the northern parts of the forest. To the east of the town of Rebild, lies the abandoned limestone mines of Thingbæk ('Thingbæk Kalkminer'), now used for underground art exhibitions and an important site for five species of hibernating bats in the winter months. The mines are administered through Rebildcentret, who also hosts various museums, activities and some conservation efforts in the area. South of Skørping is the Jyske Skovhave ('Jylland Forest Garden'), an open arboretum begun in 1886 and displaying a variety of trees and shrubs from the Northern Hemisphere.

The forest is part of the Natura 2000 network (#18 Rold Skov, Lindenborg Ådal og Madum Sø) and is both an EU habitat and a Ramsar wetland of international importance.

75% of the forest is privately owned, primarily under the manors of Lindenborg, Nørlund and Willestrup. The state of Denmark owns and administers the rest.

== History ==
Although Denmark is normally considered a safe country nowadays, Rold Skov was formerly associated with robberies and violent assaults for centuries. In the 1830s the authorities succeeded in unraveling maybe the largest gang of all, with more than a hundred robbers and courtcases spanning a total of seven years from 1837 to 1844. The events and the gangs' activities were later described in a novel by Danish writer Steen Steensen Blicher.

The closed civil government atomic bunker of Denmark, named Regan Vest (da:Regan Vest), is located in the forest.

Dannie Druehyld, known as the only witch in Denmark, resided in the forest until her death in 2021.

== Flora, fauna, and funga ==
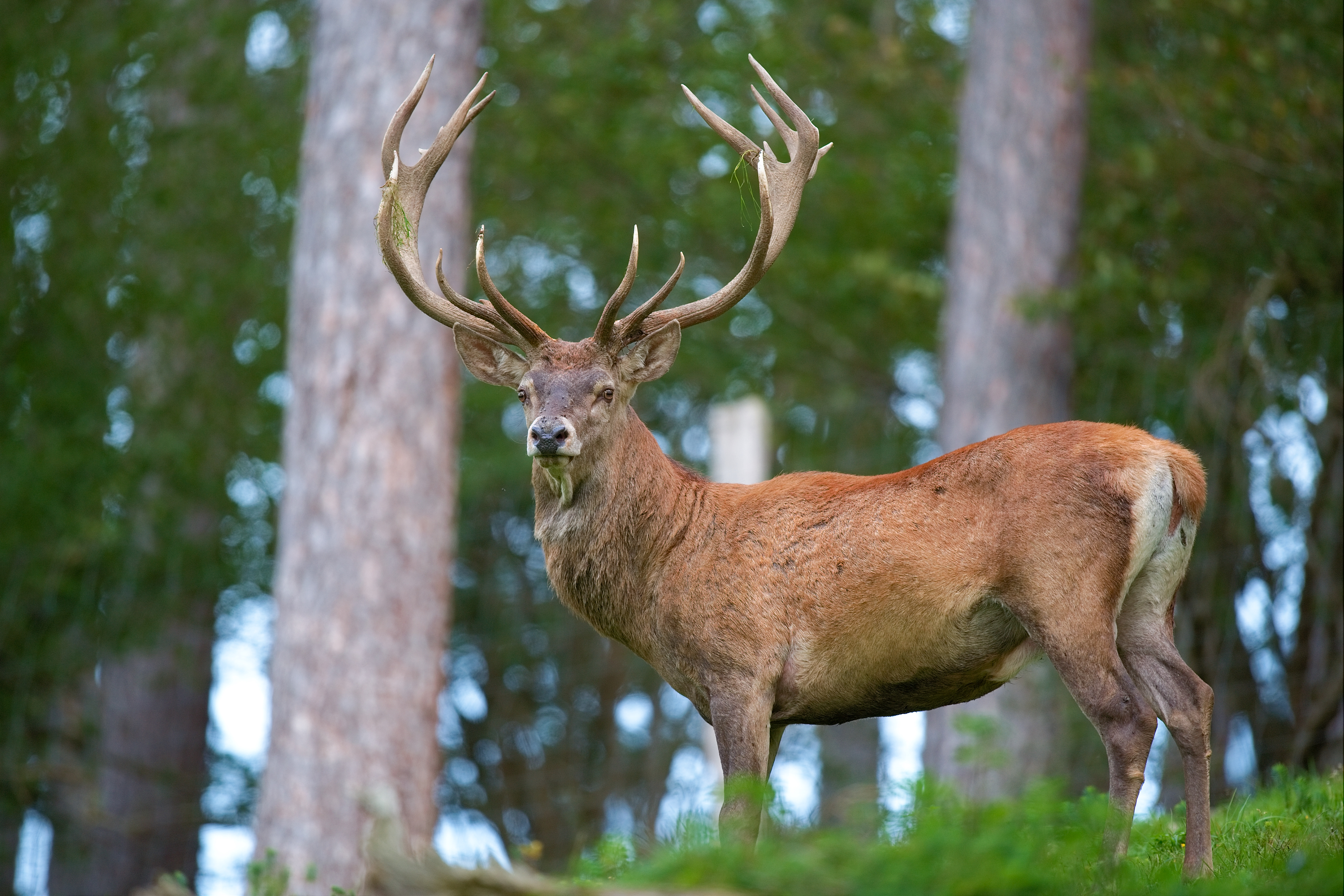
The red deer stags, are the largest animal in Rold Skov.

Rold Skov has a rich and varied fauna. It is home to a large variety of birds and the larger animals here are red deer, roe deer, badger and fox, among many different smaller animals like otter, stoat, bats and different kinds of rodents including squirrels.

Large parts of the woods are dominated by various conifers and the flora of the forest floor is rather poor of species in most areas. Where chalk comes to the surface layers, it can present some rare and more interesting plant species though, like the rare lady's-slipper orchid growing side by side with plants like pennywort, smell fox and red helleborine for example. Note: In Denmark all orchids are to be protected and it is forbidden to pick them.

Rold Skov supports a broad array of fungi, with over 5,000 different species. There are edible mushrooms to be found, but also fungi like the peculiar Troldsmør ("Troll-butter" or fuligo septica) which can move around, fly agaric, the tinder fungus used for lighting fire in the old days or the deceptive bitter bolete.

== In Literature ==
- Steen Steensen Blicher: Bettefanden.

== Gallery ==
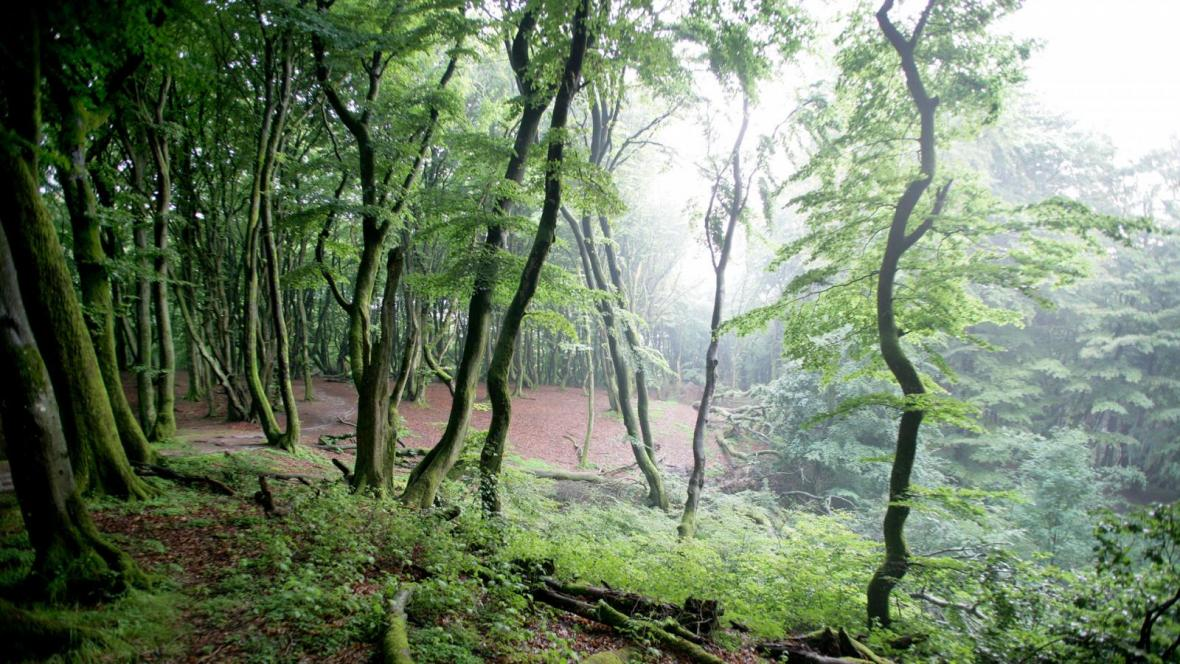
Nature scene

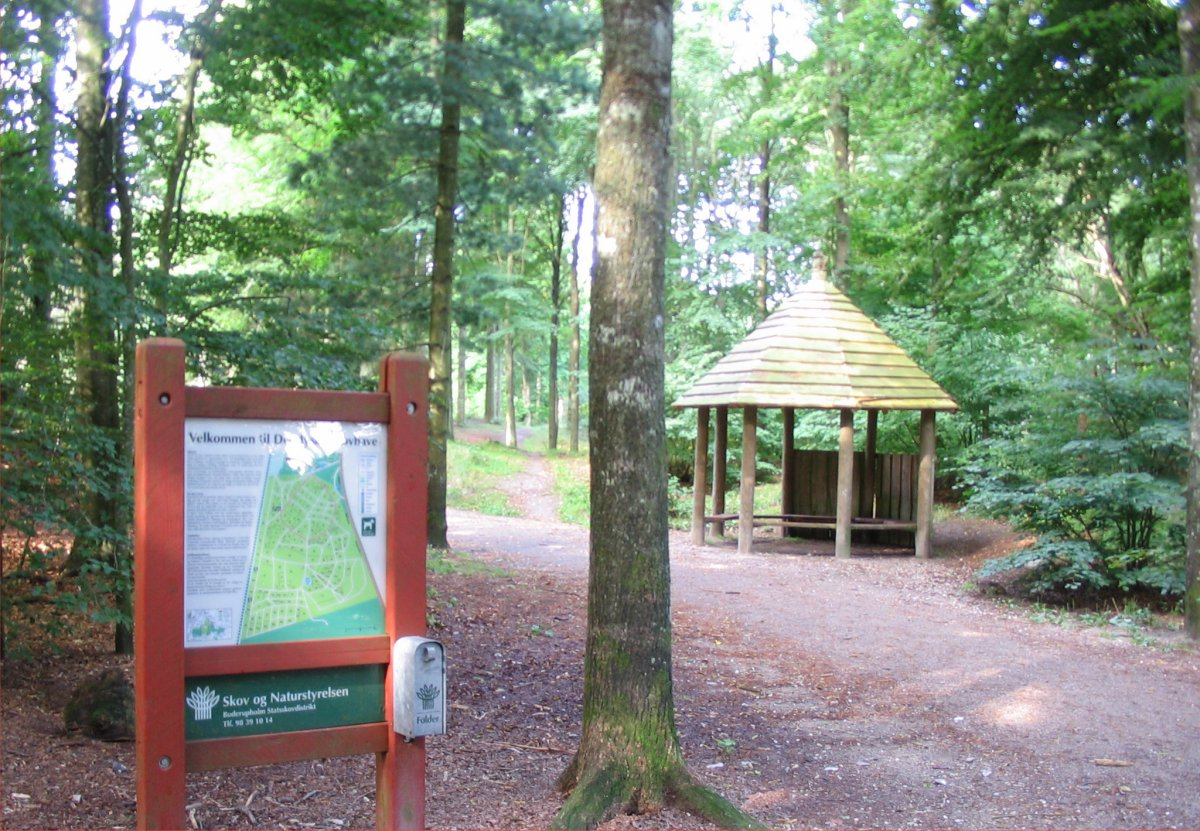
At the Jylland Forest Garden.

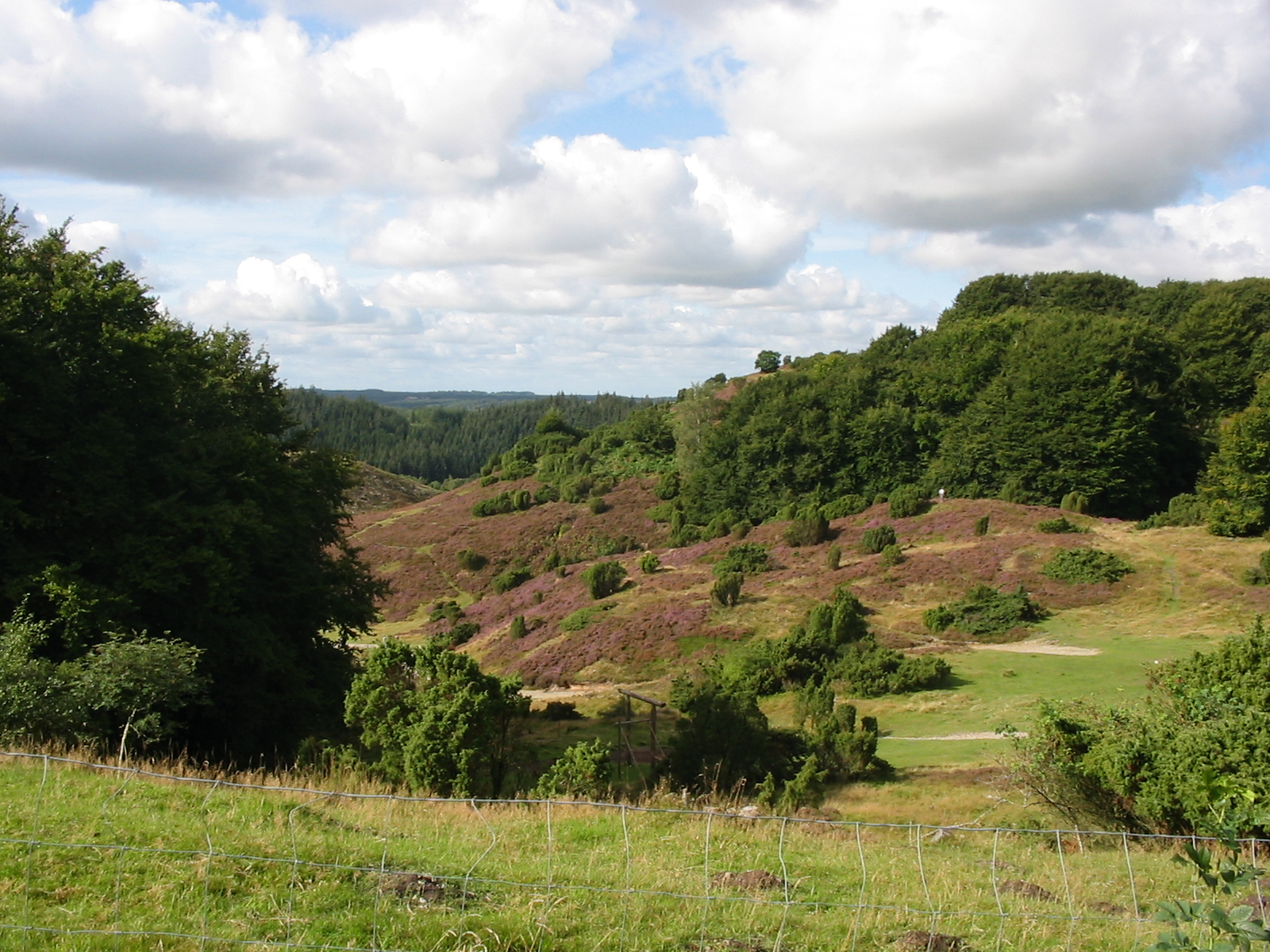
Rebild Bakker ('Rebild hills').

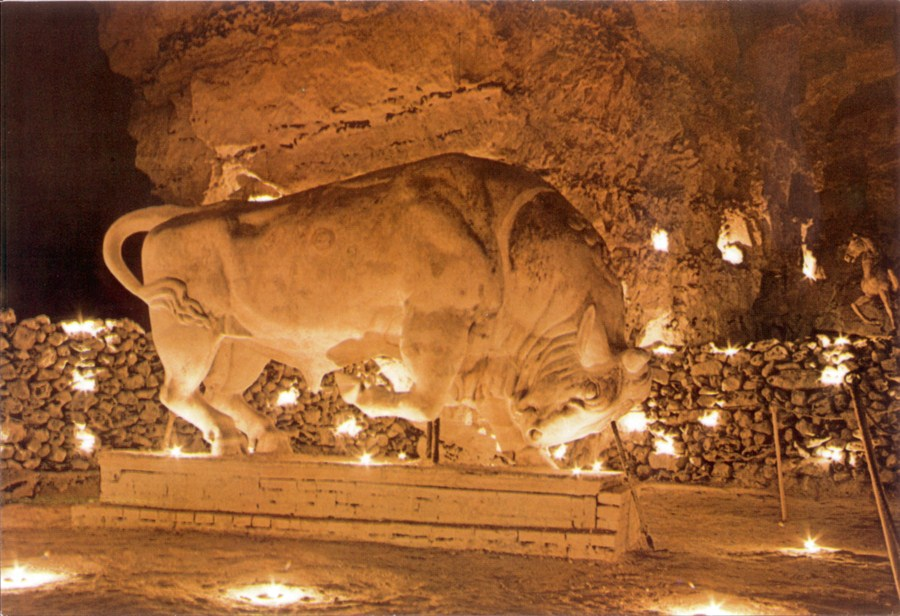
Art in Thingbæk Kalkminer.

== Sources ==
- Rold Skov Naturstyrelsen. (in Danish)
- Rold Skov Rold Skov Natur- og Kulturcenter. (in Danish)
- Rold skov Naturturist Nordjylland (in Danish)
- Forest Rold Skov Danish
- Rebild Rakker Hills of Rebild Danish
- Rold Skov Museerne Knudepunkt for museerne i Rold Skov. (in Danish)
