= Suldrup =

- Town
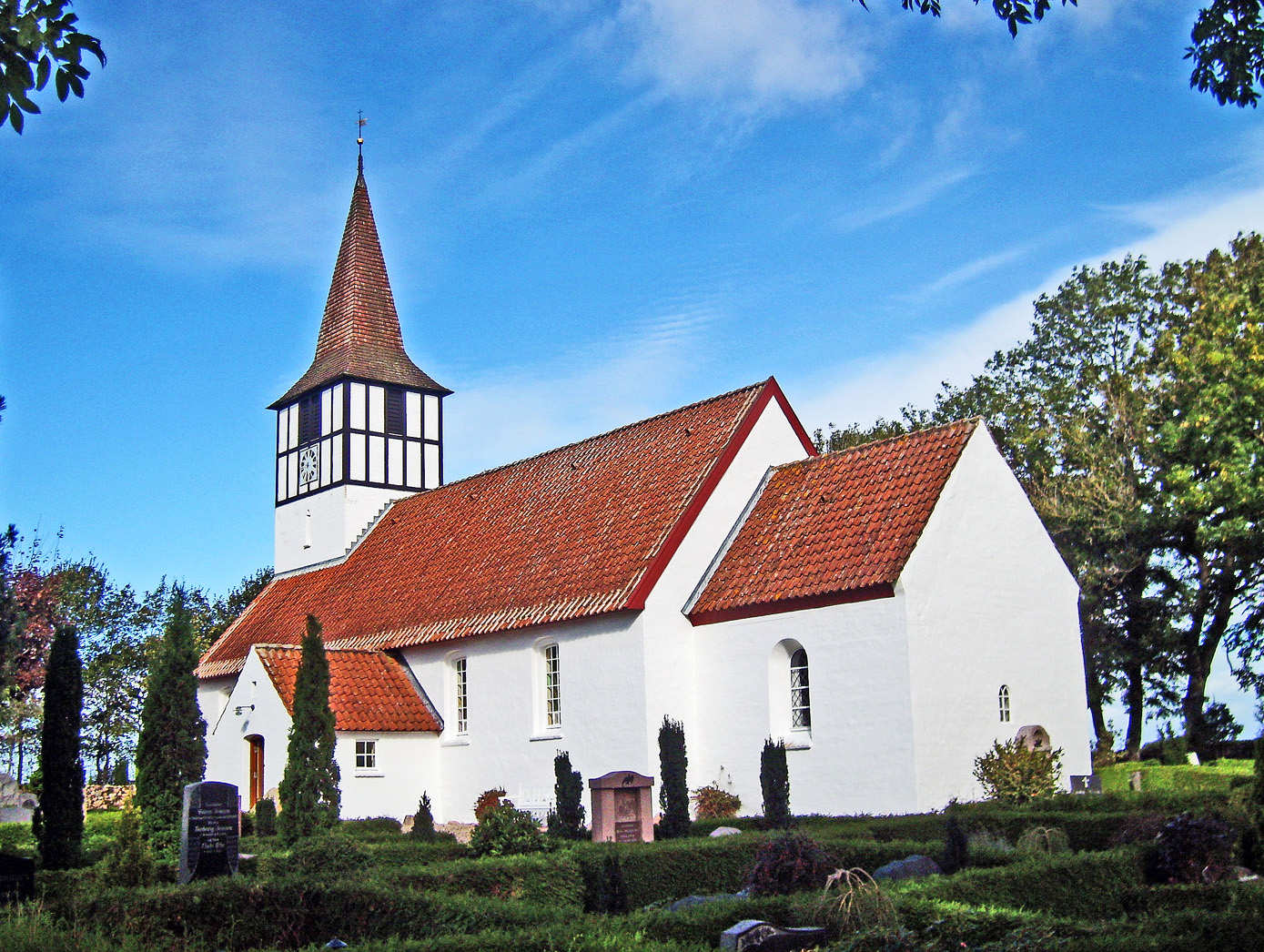
- Suldrup Church

- Location in Denmark Suldrup (North Jutland Region)
- Coordinates: 56°50′54″N 9°41′59″E
- Country: Denmark
- Region: North Jutland Region
- Municipality: Rebild Municipality

Area
  - Urban: 0.9 km^{2} (0.35 sq mi)

Population (2026)
  - Urban: 1,362
  - Urban density: 1,500/km^{2} (3,900/sq mi)
- Time zone: UTC+1 (CET)
  - Summer (DST): UTC+2 (CEST)
- Postal code: DK-9541 Suldrup

Suldrup is a town with a population of 1,362 (as of 1 January 2026) in Rebild Municipality, North Jutland Region in Denmark. It is located 25 km southwest of Aalborg

Suldrup Church is located on the northwestern outskirts of the town.

Stenshøj Jættestue is a Neolithic passage grave located in the middle of the town.
