= Max Henius =

Danish-American biochemist

- Born: June 16, 1859; Aalborg, Denmark
- Died: November 15, 1935 (aged 76)
- Education: University of Marburg (Ph.D.)
- Occupation: Chemist
- Spouse: Johanne Louise Heiberg (m. 1883)
- Relatives: Keith Carradine, Robert Carradine, Michael Bowen (great-grandsons)

Max Henius (June 16, 1859 – November 15, 1935) was a Danish-American biochemist who specialized in the fermentation processes. Max Henius co-founded the American Academy of Brewing in Chicago.

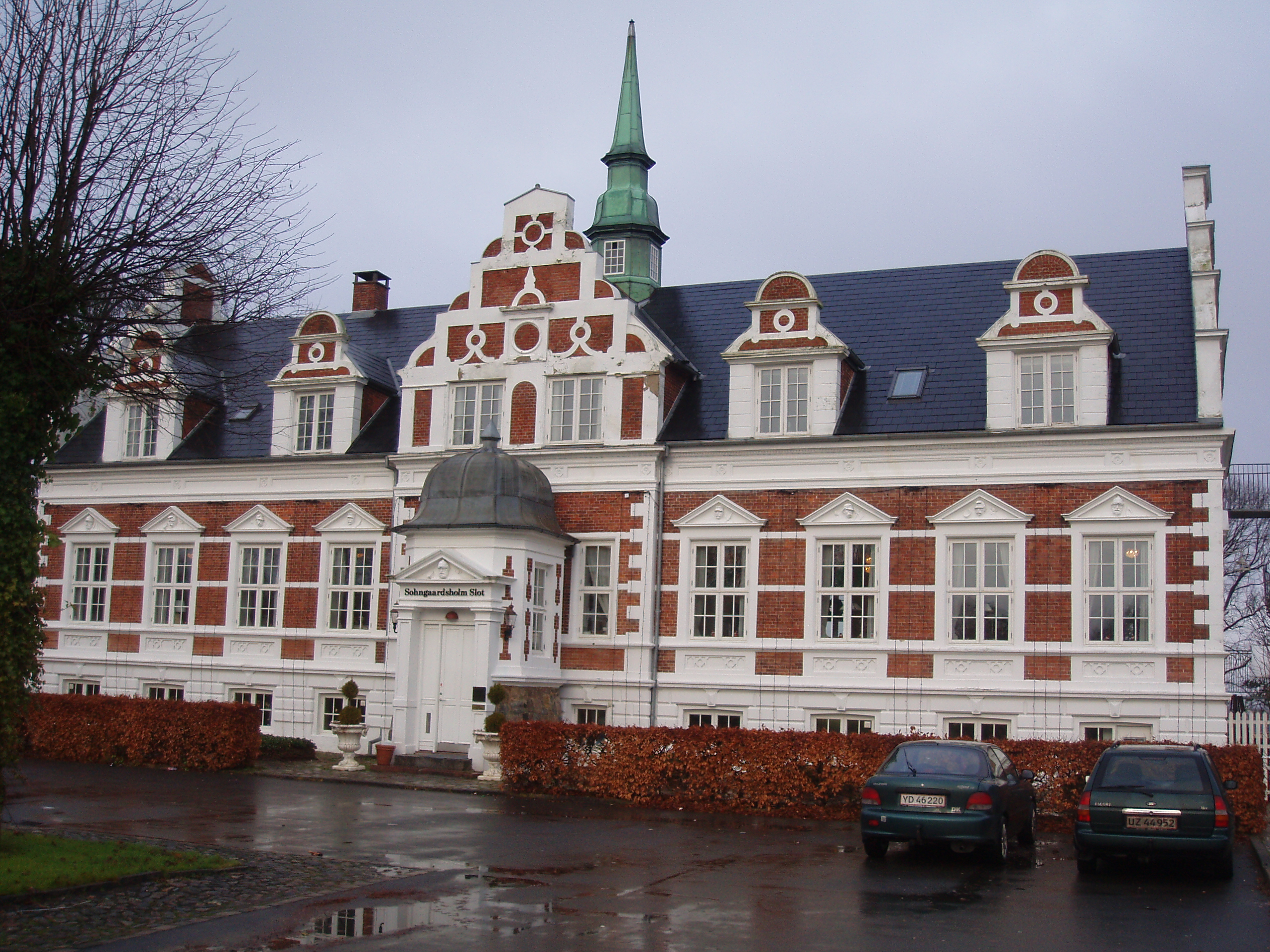
Sohngårdsholm Slot

== Background ==
Henius was born in Aalborg, Denmark. His parents were Emilie (née Wasserzug; 1839–1913) and Isidor Henius (1820–1901), both Polish Jewish immigrants. His father, who was born in Thorn, West Prussia (now Toruń, Poland), emigrated to Denmark in 1837 and continued his work for spirits distillers to improve and standardise production and later – on January 15, 1846 – co-founded one distillery, Aalborg priviligerede Sirup- og Spritfabrik, that was later, together with several other distilleries, consolidated into De Danske Spritfabrikker in 1881, a Danish distillery which – since 2012 – is part of the Norwegian Arcus Group, which closed the distillery in Aalborg in 2015, moving production to Norway instead. Isidor Henius also owned a small castle in Aalborg, now called Sohngaardsholm Slot. Since 2005, it has been the site of a gourmet restaurant.

Max Henius was educated at the Aalborg Latin School and went on to study at the Polytechnic Institute in Hanover, Germany He attended the University of Marburg, earning his Ph.D. degree in chemistry during 1881. His father sold the distillery that same year. Max Henius subsequently emigrated from Aalborg to the United States in 1881 at the age of 22, settling in Chicago. His younger brother, Erik S. Henius, (1863–1926) remained in Denmark where he was chairman of the Danish Export Association. He had another brother, Louis Henius (1870-1938), who was the grandfather of author Suzanne Brøgger.

== Career ==
Initially he was employed by the Northern Pacific Railway on an assignment to test the waters between Fargo, North Dakota, and Bozeman, Montana. In 1886, he opened a drug store

== Personal life ==
He married Danish-born Johanne Louise Heiberg (1860–1934) on June 4, 1883. She was daughter of MD Emil Theodor Heiberg and Johanne (Hanne) Henriette Jacoba Schmidt. They had three children, Henry, Emil, and Gerda. Their great-grandchildren include actors Keith Carradine, Robert Carradine, Christopher Carradine, and Michael Bowen.

== Selected works ==
- American liquor code, an outline (1933)
- Stepping stones from prohibition (1932)
- The error in the National prohibition act (1931)
- Modern liquor legislation and systems in Finland, Norway, Denmark and Sweden (1931)
- Danish beer & continental beer gardens (1914)
- Den danskfødte Amerikaner (1912)
- American Handy-Book of the Brewing, Malting and Auxiliary Trades jointly with Robert Wahl (1901)

== Primary sources ==
- Max Henius, a biography (by Max Henius Memoir Committee. Chicago, 1936)
