= Støvring =

- Town
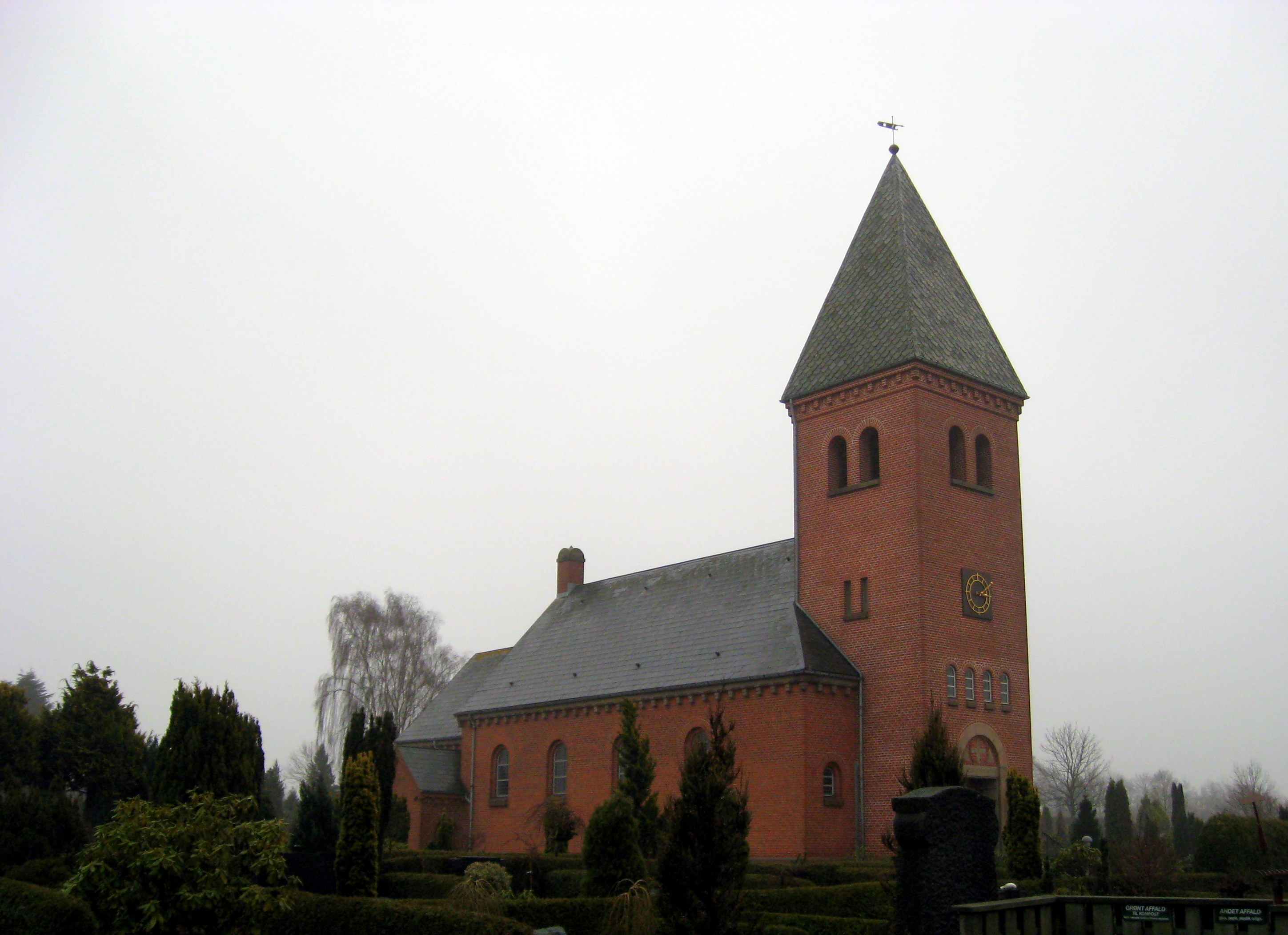
- Støvring church

- Location in Denmark Støvring (North Jutland Region)
- Coordinates: 56°53′12″N 9°49′43″E
- Country: Denmark
- Region: Region Nordjylland
- Municipality: Rebild
- Foundation: Around 17th century

Area
  - Urban: 6.8 km^{2} (2.6 sq mi)

Population (2026)
  - Urban: 9,808
  - Urban density: 1,400/km^{2} (3,700/sq mi)
  - Gender: 4,770 males and 5,038 females
- Time zone: UTC+1 (CET)
  - Summer (DST): UTC+1 (CEST)
- Postal code: DK-9530 Støvring
- Website: www.stoevring-byport.dk

Støvring is a town in Rebild municipality in Region Nordjylland in the geographic region of the Jutland peninsula known as Himmerland in northern Denmark. The town has a population of 9,808 (2026), and is one of the centres of industry and retailing in the area. It is the municipal seat of Rebild municipality. Støvring is the 8th biggest town/city in Region Nordjylland. Støvring is served by Støvring railway station, located on the Randers–Aalborg railway line. It is located 21 km from Aalborg and 37 km from Aars.

== History ==
In 1682 the village consisted of 12 farms and 8 houses without land. The total cultivated area amounted to 437.1 barrels of land due to 58.40 barrels of grains. The cultivation form was grassland with foxes.

In 1875 the city was described as follows: "Støvring with School, Watermill, Inn, 2 smaller shopping establishments and railway station.

The original Støvring railway station closed in 1974, but the station reopened in 2003 as a part of the new Aalborg Commuter Rail service.

== Municipality ==
Until 1 January 2007 Støvring was also a municipality covering an area of 220 km^{2}, and with a total population of 13,057 (2005). Støvring municipality ceased to exist as the result of Kommunalreformen ("The Municipality Reform" of 2007). It was merged with Nørager and Skørping municipalities to form the new Rebild municipality. This created a municipality with an area of 628 km^{2} and a total population of 28,457 (2005).

== Notable people ==
- Rikke Karlsson (born 1965) a Danish politician and MEP, lives in Støvring
- Michael Silberbauer (born 1981 in Støvring) a former professional footballer with 402 club caps, and 25 for Denmark

== See also ==
- Hydrema – a dump truck manufacturer in Støvring founded in 1959.
