= Skørping =

- Town
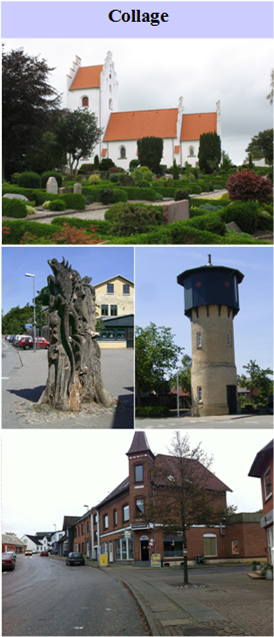
- Images from Skørping

- Location in Denmark Skørping (North Jutland Region)
- Coordinates: 56°50′9″N 9°53′14″E
- Country: Denmark
- Region: Region Nordjylland
- Municipality: Rebild Municipality

Area
  - Urban: 1.8 km^{2} (0.69 sq mi)

Population (2026)
  - Urban: 3,087
  - Urban density: 1,700/km^{2} (4,400/sq mi)
- Time zone: UTC+1 (CET)
  - Summer (DST): UTC+2 (CEST)
- Postal code: DK-9520 Skørping

Skørping is a railway town in Rebild Municipality in Region Nordjylland in the geographic region of the Jutland peninsula known as Himmerland in northern Denmark. The modern town has a population of 3,087 as of 1 January 2026.

Skørping is served by Skørping railway station, located on the Randers–Aalborg railway line.

Skørping was the municipal seat of the former Skørping Municipality (Danish, kommune), until 1 January 2007.

== Skørping Municipality ==
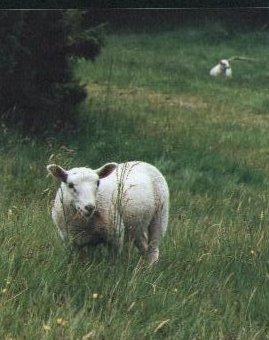
Sheep wandering through the hills of Rebild Bakker in Skørping Municipality, Denmark.

The former Skørping municipality covered an area of 238 km^{2}, and had a total population of 9,835 in 2005.

On 1 January 2007 Skørping Municipality ceased to exist as a result of the 2007 Kommunalreformen ("Municipality Reform"). It was merged with Nørager and Støvring municipalities to form the new Rebild Municipality. This created a municipality with an area of 628 km^{2} and a total population of 28,457 (2005 figures).

== Attractions ==
The town is located in the middle of the Rold Forest (Rold Skov), Denmark's second largest forested area; Lake Madum and Large Oks Lake (Store Økssø) lie south of the town of Skørping.

Rebild Bakker ("Rebild Hills") is a national park consisting of heather-covered hills, located in the municipality near the village of Rebild. The area was purchased in 1911 by a group of Americans of Danish descent. The effort was led by Max Henius, a Danish-American biochemist. In 1912 the park was given to the Danish state as a present with three conditions:

- That the area should remain in a natural state;
- That it would be open to the public;
- That Danish-Americans could celebrate American holidays at the park.

The Rebild National Park Society Inc. is an American non-profit company, whose purpose is to arrange an annual Independence Day (4th of July) festival at the park. The first Rebild Festival took place in 1912, when King Christian X spoke to a crowd of 10,000. The day has been celebrated every year since then, with the exception of the periods during World War I and World War II. It is the largest Fourth of July celebration outside the United States, and features speeches by American and Danish politicians, as well as general entertainment.

The park is visited by 400,000 people each year, making it one of Denmark's major tourist attractions. It has many hiking trails, and sheep wander loose in the hilly terrain. There is also a full-size reproduction of Abraham Lincoln's log cabin and a totem pole in the park.

== Notable people ==
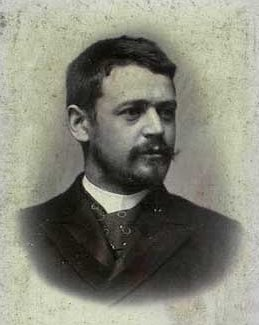
Anders Bundgaard, pre-1916

- Jørgen Friis (?? – died in 1616 in Skørping) a Danish lord and Governor-general of Norway
- Anders Bundgaard (1864 in Ersted near Skørping – 1937) a Danish sculptor
- Evald Thomsen (1913 in Siem near Skørping – 1993) a fiddler and collector and promoter of Danish traditional music
- Thyra Frank (born 1952 in Skørping) a Danish nurse and politician
- Jesper Møller (born 1963 in Skørping) Chairman of the Danish Football Union (DBU) since 2014
- Jakob Axel Nielsen (born 1967 in Terndrup near Skørping) a Danish lawyer and politician, brought up in Hadsund
- Bo Svensson (born 1979 in Skørping) a retired Danish professional footballer, 291 club caps
