= Rebild Municipality =

Rebild Municipality Rebild Kommune (Danish)
- Municipality
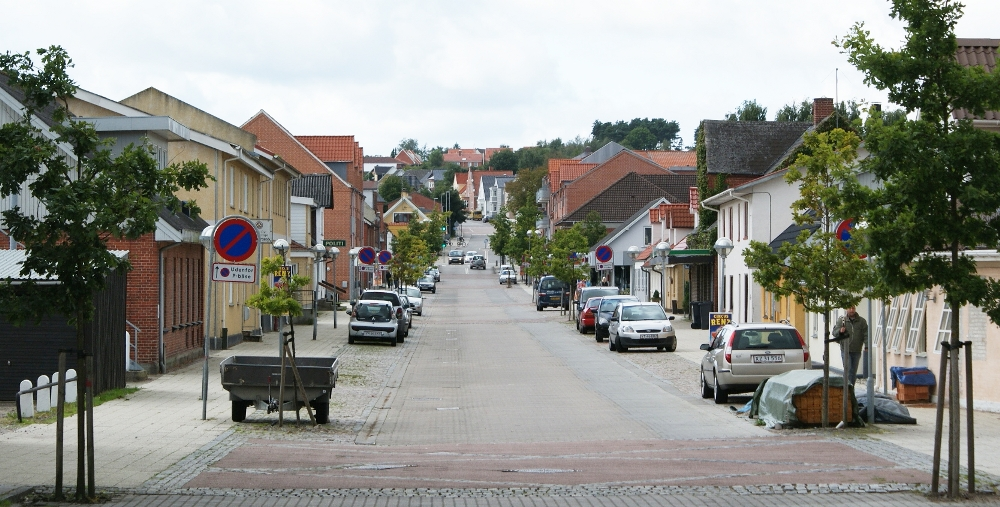
- Støvring

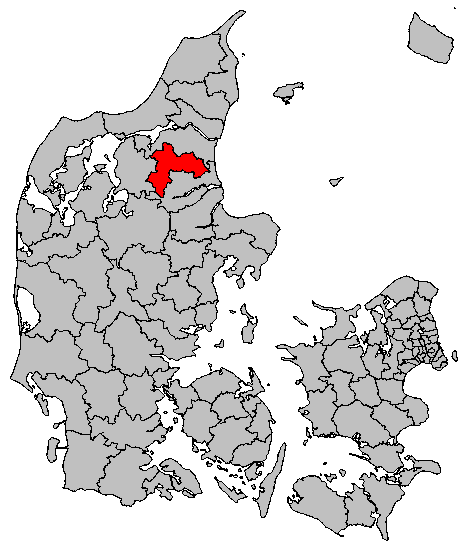
- Location in Denmark
- Coordinates: 56°53′10″N 9°49′10″E
- Country: Denmark
- Region: North Jutland
- Established: 1 January 2007

Government
  - Mayor: Jesper Greth

Area
  - Total: 628 km^{2} (242 sq mi)

Population (1 January 2026)
  - Total: 31,280
  - Density: 49.8/km^{2} (129/sq mi)
- Time zone: UTC+1 (CET)
  - Summer (DST): UTC+2 (CEST)
- Postal code: 9530
- Website: rebild.dk

Rebild Municipality (Danish: Rebild Kommune) is a kommune in the North Jutland Region of Denmark. It covers an area of 628km^{2} and has a total population of 31,280 (2026).

On 1 January 2007, Rebild Municipality was created as the result of Kommunalreformen ("The Municipal Reform" of 2007), consisting of the former municipalities of Nørager, Skørping and Støvring.

Danes and descendants of emigrants have celebrated the U.S. Independence Day with barbecues, square dancing and country music outside Rebild, a village 155 miles northwest of Copenhagen. The land that today comprises Rebild National Park, south of Aalborg, was bought by Americans of Danish descent and donated to the people and nation of Denmark under the conditions that the park remain open for the public and as a space to celebrate American holidays.

There is also a small museum called The Lincoln Blokhuset (Log Cabin).

== Locations ==
Støvring	9,300
Skørping	3,100
Terndrup	1,700
Suldrup	1,400
Nørager	1,100
Øster Hornum	1,000
Haverslev	772
Bælum	721
Rebild	606
Blenstrup	500

== Politics ==
=== Municipal council ===
Rebild's municipal council consists of 25 members, elected every four years.

Below are the municipal councils elected since the Municipal Reform of 2007.

Election	Party											Total seats	Turnout	Elected mayor
Election	A	B	C	D	F	J	L	L	O	V	Ø	Total seats	Turnout	Elected mayor
2005	6	1	2	1	1		2		1	11		25	75.7%	Anny Winther (V)
2009	7	2	1		2	2			2	9		25	73.9%	Anny Winther (V)
2013	4	3	2		1	2		3	2	7	1	25	80.8%	Leon Sebbelin (B)
2017	5	3	3					4	2	8		25	78.5%	Leon Sebbelin (B)
Data from Kmdvalg.dk 2005, 2009, 2013 and 2017

== See also ==
- Ravnkilde
- Rebild Festival
