= Rail transport in Denmark =

Rail network of Denmark
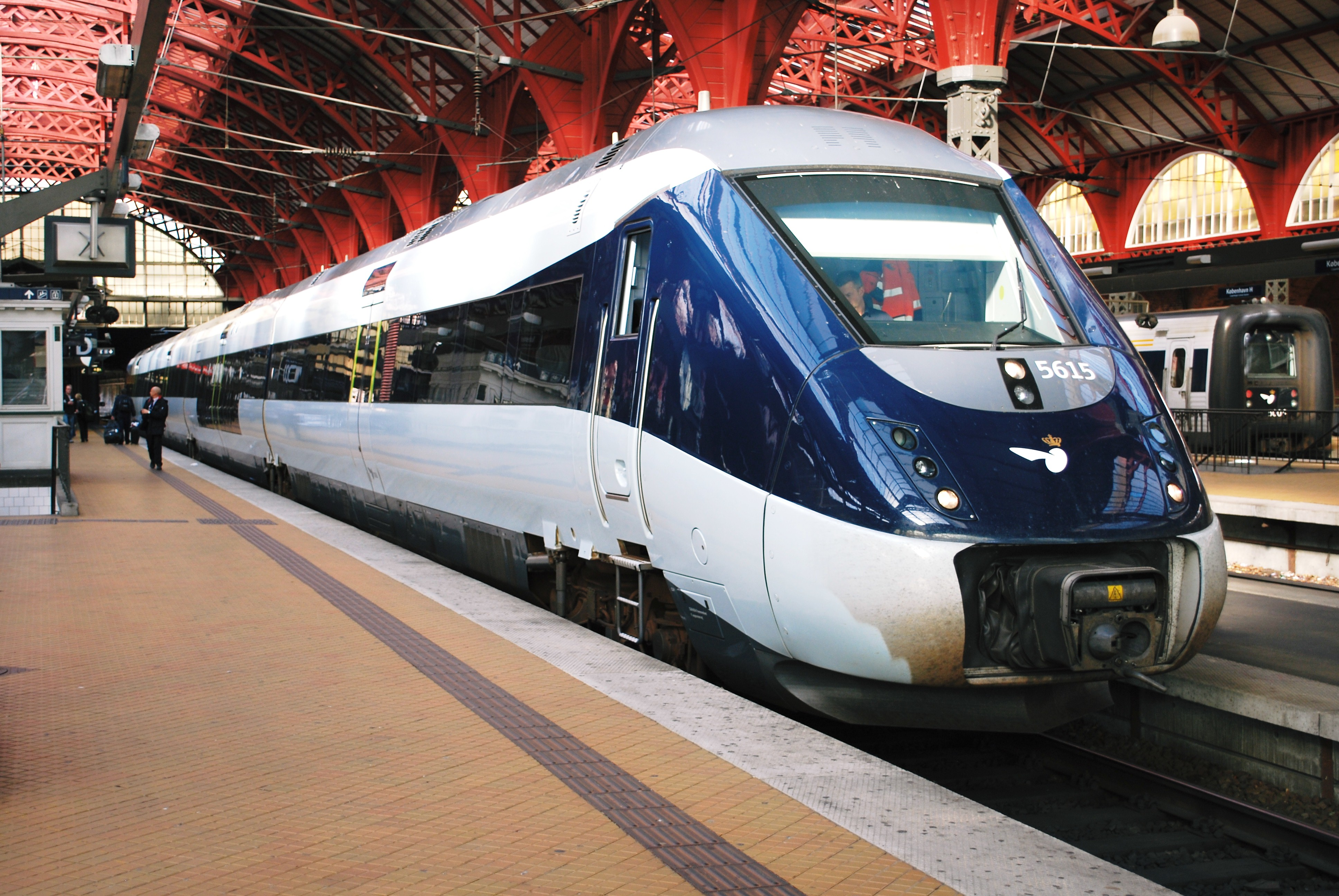
- DSB IC4 in Copenhagen Central Station

Operation
- National railway: DSB
- Infrastructure company: Banedanmark
- Major operators: Arriva^{dk} DSB; DB Cargo; Lokaltog

Statistics
- Ridership: 206,566,000 (2017)
- Passenger-distance: 6.653 billion (2016)
- Freight: 2.575 billion tkm (2016)

System length
- Total: 2,633 km (1,636 mi) (2022)
- Double track: 1,098 km (682 mi)
- Electrified: 964 km (599 mi) as of Jan 1st 2023
- Freight only: 4 km (2.5 mi)

Track gauge
- Main: 1,435 mm (4 ft 8 1/2 in)

Electrification
- Main arteries, 25 kV 50 Hz: 474 km (295 mi) (2023)
- 1650 V DC (S-train): 171 km (106 mi) (2023)
- 750 V DC (Metro): 38 km (24 mi) (2023)

Features
- No. of stations: 567 (2022)
Map
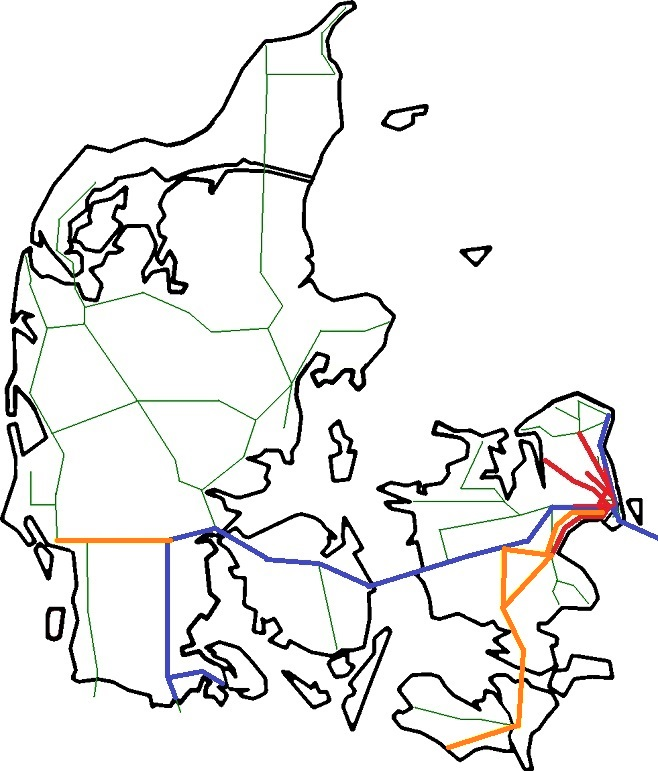
- Active lines of the Danish railway network: Green: Non-electrified lines Blue: Lines electrified before 2012; Orange: Lines electrified since 2012; Red: S-train lines The Copenhagen Metro is not shown.

The rail transport system in Denmark consists of 2,633 km (1,636 mi) of railway lines, of which the Copenhagen S-train network, the main line Helsingør-Copenhagen-Padborg (at the German border), and the Lunderskov-Esbjerg line are electrified. Most traffic is passenger trains, although there is considerable transit goods traffic between Sweden and Germany.

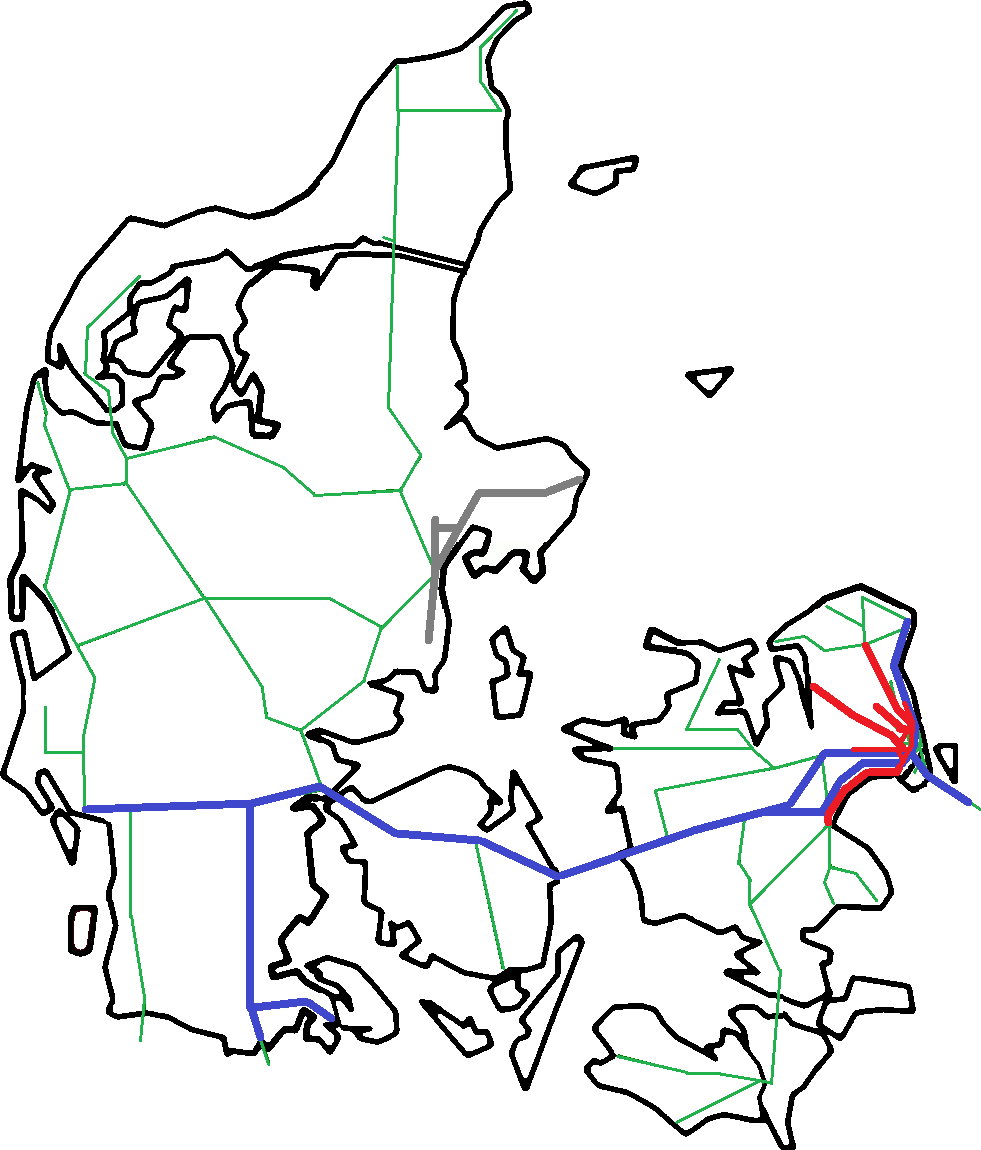
Electrification 2021

Maintenance work on most Danish railway lines is done by Banedanmark, a state-owned company that also allocates tracks for train operators. The majority of passenger trains are operated by DSB, with Nordjyske Jernbaner and Midtjyske Jernbaner operating on some lines in Jutland. Goods transport is mainly performed by DB Schenker Rail, although other operators take care of a significant portion of the non-transit traffic.

Denmark is a member of the International Union of Railways (UIC). The UIC Country Code for Denmark is 86.

== History ==
The Kingdom of Denmark's first railway opened between Copenhagen and Roskilde in 1847. The first railway in the Danish Duchy of Schleswig opened between Flensburg and Tønning in 1854.

The first railways in Denmark were built and operated by private companies. The railways in Funen and Jutland were built by Peto and Betts who also supplied the locomotives (built by Canada Works, Birkenhead). Most of the technical staff was also recruited from Britain, notably from the Eastern Counties Railway. When Peto and Betts went into insolvency, the Danish state took over Det danske Jernbane-Driftsselskab (The Danish Railway Operating Company) as of 1 September 1867 under the name De jysk-fyenske Jernbaner (the Funen and Jutland Railways), from 1874 De danske Statsbaner i Jylland og Fyn (The Danish State Railways in Jutland and Funen). The network was extended by new construction and by acquisition of the privately operated lines from Silkeborg to Herning (1 November 1879) and from Grenaa to Randers and Aarhus (1 April 1881).

The Danish state took over Det sjællandske Jernbaneselskab (the Railway Company of Zealand) on 1 January 1880, forming De sjællandske Statsbaner (the State Railways of Zealand). With the majority of railways on both sides of the Great Belt thus owned by the Danish state, it was not until 1 October 1885 that the companies of Jutland/Funen and Zealand merged into one national railway company, De danske Statsbaner (the Danish State Railways), the merger being finalised on 1 April 1893.

Important projects that followed for the Danish rail network include the Great Belt Fixed Link in 1998, the Øresund Bridge in 2000 and the Copenhagen–Ringsted Line (Denmark's first high-speed rail) in 2019.

== Network ==
=== Tracks ===
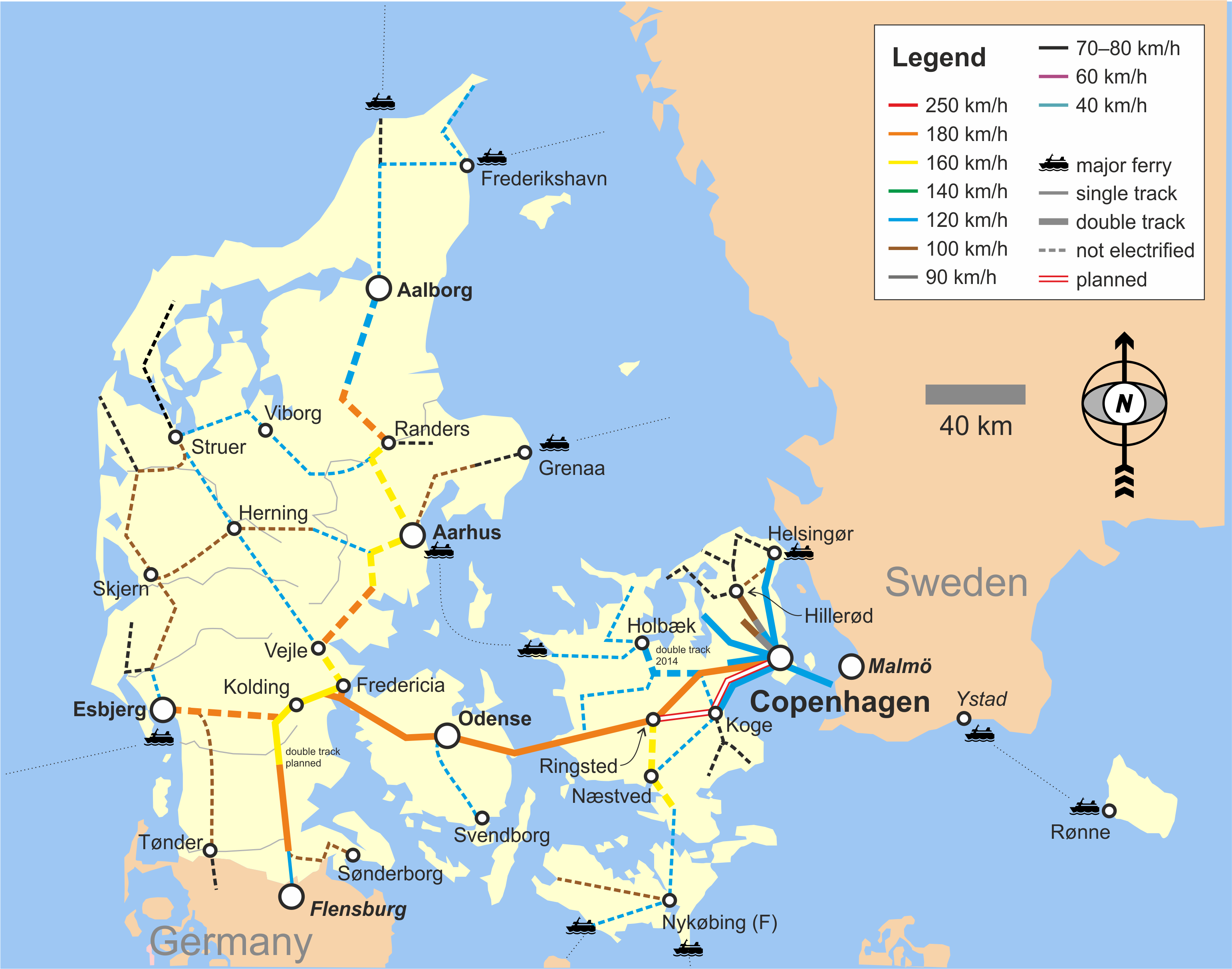
Maximum speeds on the Danish railways, as of 2014.

Map of the current, under construction and approved high-speed lines set to be built or upgraded in Denmark. Also includes completed lines.

Banedanmark is in charge of 2,045 km of railway lines, which do not include the lines controlled by private railways. All Danish railways are 1,435 mm (4 ft 8 1/2 in) (standard gauge), with the exception of a few narrow gauge museum railways; 1,000 mm (3 ft 3 3/8 in) gauge was previously common on branch lines, with 700 mm (2 ft 3 9/16 in) being prevalent on industry railways, such as those for transporting sugar beets or even calcium, coal, peat and many other things as well. The narrow gauge lines generally disappeared during the 1950s and 1960s.

The maximum speed allowed on main lines is generally 180 km/h, with less trafficked lines usually allowing between 75 and 120 km/h; the speed may be lowered in places due to the condition of the track. While wooden sleepers are used on sidings and branch lines, concrete sleepers are the norm on all main lines; the common two-block concrete sleepers are now being phased out in favour of monoblock ones.

The age of the tracks in Banedanmark's network has become increasingly problematic in later years. A 2002/03 analysis of Banestyrelsen's (now Banedanmark) network states that the average age of the track is too high, with a present average age of 24 years compared to the recommended 20 years.

Banedanmark also owns the S-train lines, but does not own every railway in the country. It does not own local railways around Hillerød, Zealand (such as the Frederiksværk Line and Gribskov Line) and the East Line, Odsherred Line, Tølløse Line, ( Thy Line, Lemvig Line, Aarhus Letbane Jutland) and Copenhagen Metro.

=== Electrification ===
General-purpose electric propulsion was adopted quite recently in Denmark; the political decision to electrify the main lines was made in 1979. The first line to be electrified was Copenhagen–Helsingør, electrified in 1986, followed by the main line across Zealand, Funen and Southern Jutland in the 1980s–90s. On the main lines that are equipped with them, the overhead lines carry 25 kV AC at 50 Hz. The system is used on the main line from Sweden through Copenhagen to Fredericia, and from there to Padborg and the German border. Both Sweden and Germany use 15 kV at 16 2/3 Hz and 16.7 Hz respectively, and the multi-system class EG goods locomotive is equipped for both 25 and 15 kV.

The S-train network in Copenhagen operates at 1650 V DC, supplied from overhead lines; it was the first electric network in Denmark, electrified around 1930. The newer Copenhagen Metro uses 750 V DC, supplied from a third rail.

Since there are heavy delays of several years with the construction of the new IC4 diesel multiple units, many commentators argue that it is better to electrify major railways and purchase electric multiple units instead, since that is a more common product. At least the route Fredericia-Ålborg must be electrified in order to run electric passenger trains between Jutland and Copenhagen. The route between Kolding-Esbjerg was due to be to open for electric trains in 2015. The government has in 2009 decided to delay all electrification for several years until the new signal system ERTMS is introduced, since electrification earlier than that requires rebuilding of the existing signal system.

In September 2013 the government reached a deal with the Danish People's Party and the Red-Green Alliance (Denmark) to use additional oil taxes to create a train fund. This train fund would be used to electrify all of the main line trains by 2025, and increase train speeds to 250 kilometres per hour (160 mph) for InterCity trains. This would allow for travel between the cities of Copenhagen, Odense, Esbjerg, Aarhus, and Aalborg in four hours.

On 29 May 2015 Banedanmark announced a 2.8 billion DKK (€375 million) contract to have Aarsleff-Siemens electrify 1300 km of tracks before 2026.

Danish State Railways received a €500 million loan in 2022 from the EIB to purchase 100 new electric trains, to replace diesel-powered trains for more sustainable passenger traffic. The Coradia Stream train sets are to be delivered from 2025.

=== Safety and signalling ===
==== S-train ====
HKT, which was introduced in 1975 and utilised cab signalling, was used on the S-train network, although a simplified version, "forenklet HKT" (F-HKT), was used on some of the lines.

The S-train network was to be refitted with the CBTC system, which allows driverless trains, by 2020. The migration to CBTC was completed by 2022.

==== Main lines ====
Main lines were equipped with the ATC safety system during the 1990s, with a partial, cheaper implementation, ATC train stop, being used on some (but not all) branch lines.

Denmark has its own ATC system (ZUB 123), not compatible with other countries. It is a modification of the Swiss system. Trains crossing the border to Sweden or Germany have to have two ATC systems, and handle two electrical supply systems.

In order to replace the different and aging signal systems, it has been decided to replace all current signal systems on Banedanmark's active network, except the S-train lines, with ERTMS level 2, relying entirely on cab signalling; general rollout is scheduled for 2018–21.

In October 2023, the migration to ERTMS was scheduled to complete by 2030.

=== Safety record ===
Serious incidents on Denmark's railways have been rare. The seven most serious are:

- 1897: The Gentofte train crash. A delayed local train was hit by a special train. 40 were killed and 132 were injured in the accident.
- 1913: The Bramminge train accident. An express train became derailed near Bramming. 15 were killed, including Peter Sabroe, and 54 injured.
- 1919: The Vigerslev train crash. An express train from Korsør drove violently into five wagons at Vigerslev. The train was stationary due to an emergency application of the brakes and reversing to retrieve a child who had fallen onto the rails. 40 died and 30 were severely injured.
- 1967: The Odense express train accident. An express train hit another outside Odense. 11 people died while 47 were injured in the accident.
- 1988: The 1988 Sorø derailment. A train ran off the rails at high speed at Sorø. Eight people died and 72 were injured.
- 2019: The Great Belt Bridge rail accident. A passenger train collided with a semi-trailer from a passing freight train. Eight people died and 16 were injured.
- 2025: The Tinglev slurry tanker crash. A passenger train collided with a slurry tanker at a level crossing. One person died and 20 were injured.

== Operations ==
=== Urban rail transport ===
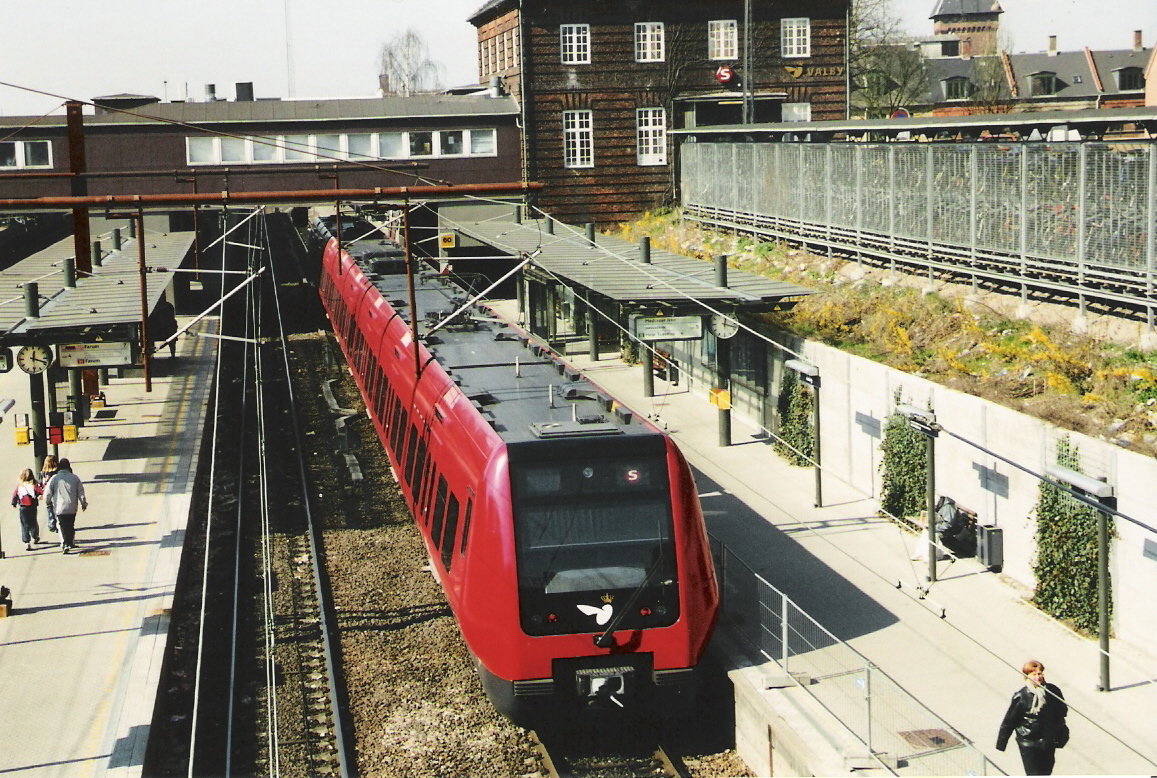
A S-train EMU at Valby station in 2002

Urban rail transport in Denmark currently consists of one metro system in Copenhagen, two light rail systems in Aarhus and Odense and two commuter rail systems, the S-Train in Copenhagen and the Aalborg Commuter Rail. The three largest cities of Copenhagen, Aarhus and Odense had tram networks in the 19th and 20th century, with the last tram line in Copenhagen being closed in 1972 when trams were replaced by buses and private cars, because they were considered an outdated form of transportation. the Greater Copenhagen Light Rail are the third light rail system in Denmark after Aarhus in 2017 and Odense in 2022 and is currently under construction and is expected to open in 2025.

A rapid transit proposed for the Øresund metropolitan area, the Øresund Metro is also under discussion.

==== Copenhagen Metro ====
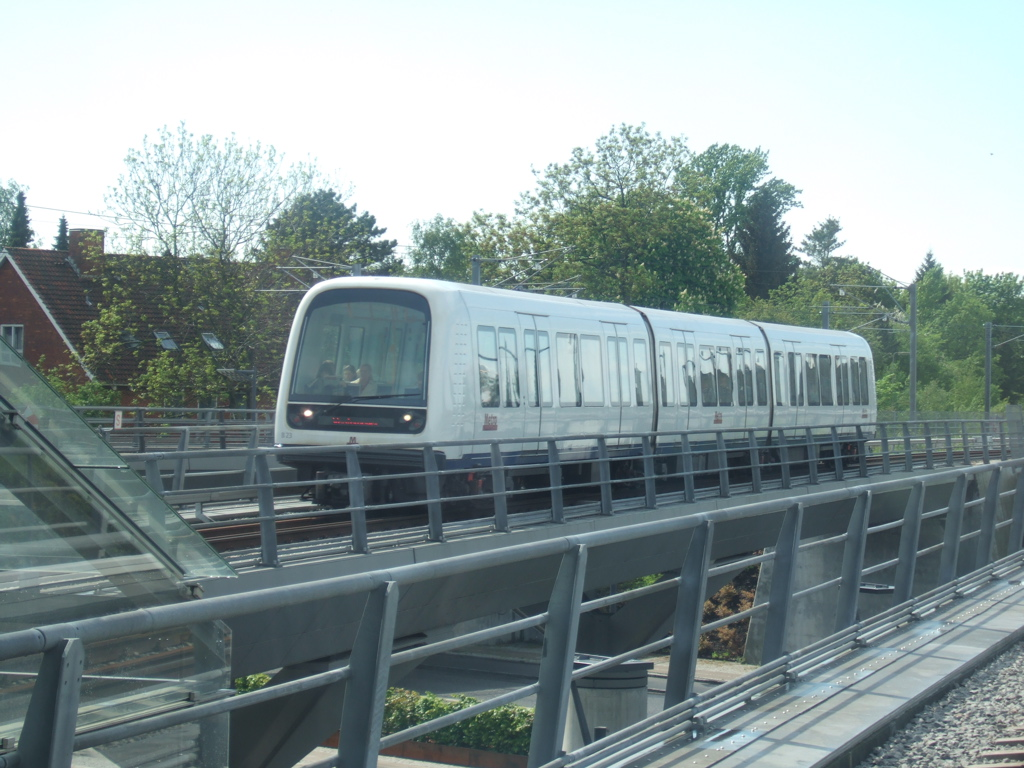
Copenhagen Metro train

The Copenhagen Metro is an automated, 24-hour rapid transit system which serves Denmark's capital city, Copenhagen. It began operation in 2002. It is also the only rapid transit system in Denmark. As of March 2020, the system consists of four lines: M1, M2, M3 and M4. Planning of the Metro started in 1992 as part of the redevelopment plans for Ørestad with construction starting in 1996, and stage 1, from Nørreport to Vestamager and Lergravsparken, opened in 2002. Stage 2, from Nørreport to Vanløse, opened in 2003, followed by stage 3, from Lergravsparken to Lufthavnen, in 2007. The City Circle Line is an entirely underground 15.5 km loop through central Copenhagen and Frederiksberg with 17 stops. It does not share any track with the M1 and M2 lines, but intersect them at Kongens Nytorv and Frederiksberg stations. With the City loop opened, the Metro expects that its ridership should almost double from its 2016 levels to 116 million annual passengers. A fourth line, M4, will be developed into a separate line between 2020 and 2024, as extensions of the Cityringen to Nordhavn and Sydhavn open. The two-stop three-kilometre-long line to Nordhavn opened in March 2020. The extension adds an interchange with Nordhavn S-train station. The five-stop extension to Sydhavn opened on 22 June 2024. The Sydhavn line will terminate at Ny Ellebjerg where it will create a new regional rail transport hub by connecting the metro system to the S-train network, regional trains, and long-distance trains on the current lines and the upcoming high speed Copenhagen-Ringsted railway. Once these extensions are complete, Metro expects the daily ridership to triple from its current level of 200,000 riders per weekday to 600,000 riders per weekday in 2030.

==== Aarhus light rail ====
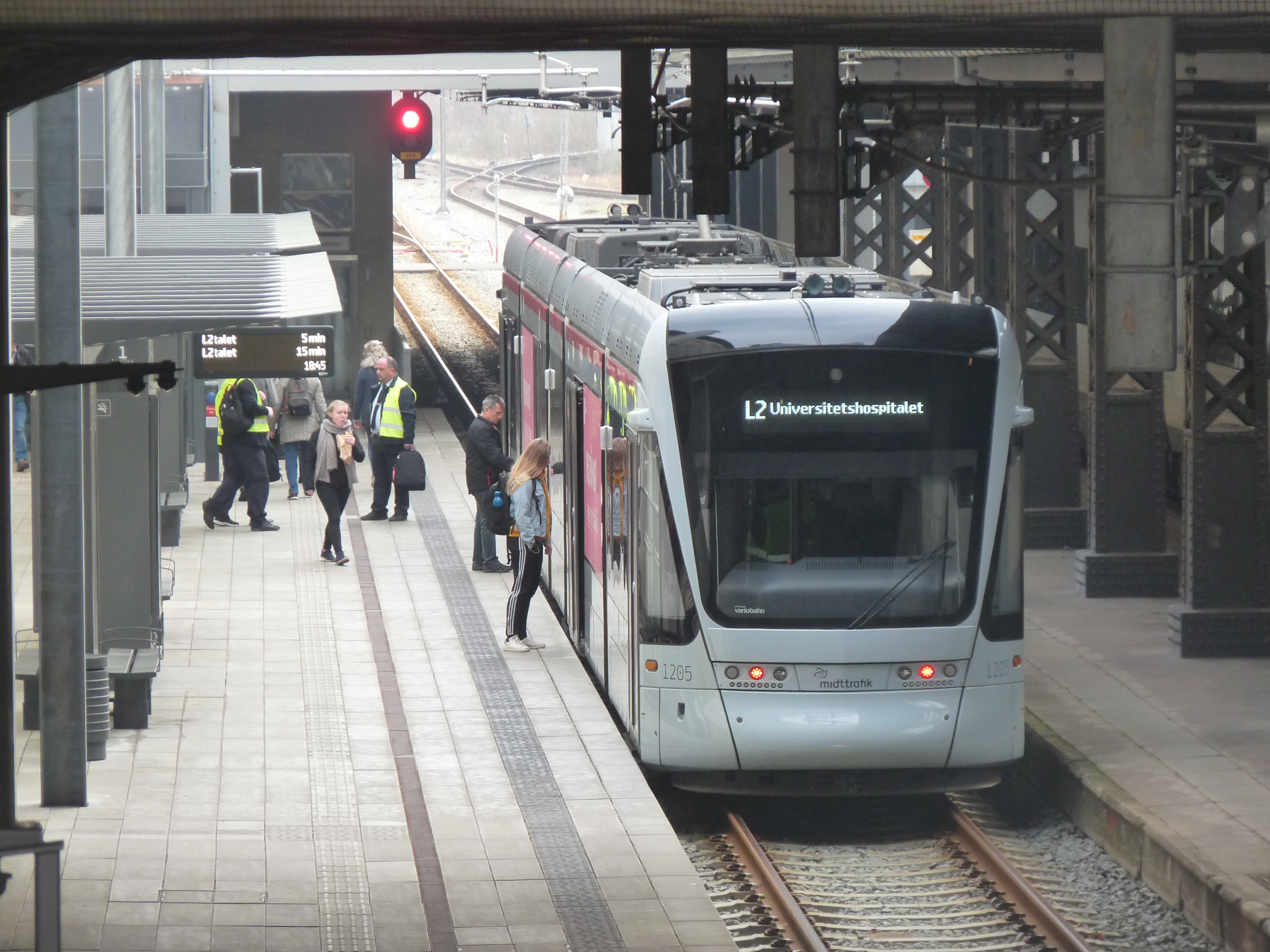
Tram on the Aarhus light rail system in January 2018, one month after the opening of the system

The Aarhus Letbane (Aarhus light rail) is a light rail system in the city of Aarhus, Denmark. It is operated by the company Midttrafik. The first line opened in December 2017, but the system is under continuous development and expansion. Service on the intercity section Odder to Lisbjergskolen opened on 25 August 2018. A third intercity line to Grenå opened on 30 April 2019. More lines are being planned. On 8 May 2012, the Danish Parliament approved the construction of the first line; work to build Phase 1 commenced during September 2013. It was originally planned to open in August 2016, but this was delayed, in part due to legislative issues in relation to railway safety. Two types of rolling stock have been operated over the first line, conventional trams which are slower and restricted to only running along some parts of the route and hybrid tram-trains that can be operated on the conventional heavy rail network, the latter being used for the long-distance services.

=== Railway operators ===
Railway undertakings currently operating in Denmark:

- CFL cargo
- DSB
- Lokaltog
- Metro Service A/S, running Copenhagen Metro
- MJBA – Midtjyske Jernbaner
- NJ – Nordjyske Jernbaner
- SJ AB (formerly Statens Järnvägar)
- DB Cargo

== Future expansion ==
As part of ongoing plans for high-speed rail in Denmark, new corridors and lines are or were being planned:

=== Lines ===
==== Vestfyn Line between Odense and Kauslunde ====
As of 2023, still planned. Originally slated for construction from 2023. Like the Copenhagen-Ringsted Line, the Vestfyn Line will be built to allow speeds of up to 250 km/h, and while DSB does not have any trains capable of operating above 200 km/h nor any plans to acquire such, the SJ AB (Sweden's state-owned primary passenger train operator) has ordered 250 km/h-capable trains (SJ Zefiro Express) and has expressed interest in operating intercity trains via the line.

==== A new Hovedgård-Hasselager line. ====
Professor Otto Anker Nielsen estimated in 2023 that this project could be started between 2035 and 2040. As of 2023, there is no political majority for the project.

==== A new Aarhus–Silkeborg line ====
As of 2023, the government was planning a single-track railway. Banedanmark is planning to have battery-driven trains use new 30 km section.

==== A line to Billund (scrapped) ====
This proposal was scrapped in 2021.

=== ERTMS rollout ===
The following map shows the year in which ERTMS will be implemented on various sections of railway.

== Connection to adjacent countries by rail ==
Denmark has railway connections to Sweden and Germany, both of which use the same rail gauge as in Denmark. The electric voltage is different as Sweden and Germany use 15 kV AC while Denmark uses 25 kV AC. The train protection systems are also different between all three countries. This means that locomotives must be specially modified to cross the borders, while railway wagons can freely cross the border if there is a suitable locomotive.

Connections to Sweden use the Øresund Railway across Øresund Bridge. Services include SJ's X 2000 service to Stockholm and Øresundståg commuter services to Malmö Central Station and beyond.

There are two connections to Germany. The main connection is over land at Padborg, which carries ICE, intercity and regional trains to Hamburg, and used to carry EuroNight and CityNightLine trains to Amsterdam via Cologne, Basel via Frankfurt, Munich via Nürnberg, and Prague via Berlin. The second crossing is overland at Tønder, Denmark and Süderlügum, Germany, which connects to Niebüll. The Vogelfluglinie route, is from December 2019 closed for trains, until then carried EuroCity and ICE services, using the train ferry from Rødby, Denmark to Puttgarden on the island of Fehmarn, Germany, and from there proceeded via Lübeck and Hamburg to Berlin. The Rødby ferry and Tønder crossing allow only diesel powered trains, while the Padborg crossing is electrified. The Fehmarn Belt Fixed Link is an under-construction tunnel across the Fehmarnbelt between Denmark and Germany.

Since November 2014, CityNightLine does not service Denmark anymore. Sleeper trains serving Denmark include Snälltåget's seasonal services to Berlin and the Austrian Alps and SJ AB's service to Berlin and Hamburg.

Due to delays in delivering Talgo 230 equipment, DSB in 2023 rented UIC-Z wagons from Deutsche Bahn. The Talgo equipment is similar to the ICE L.

== Image gallery ==
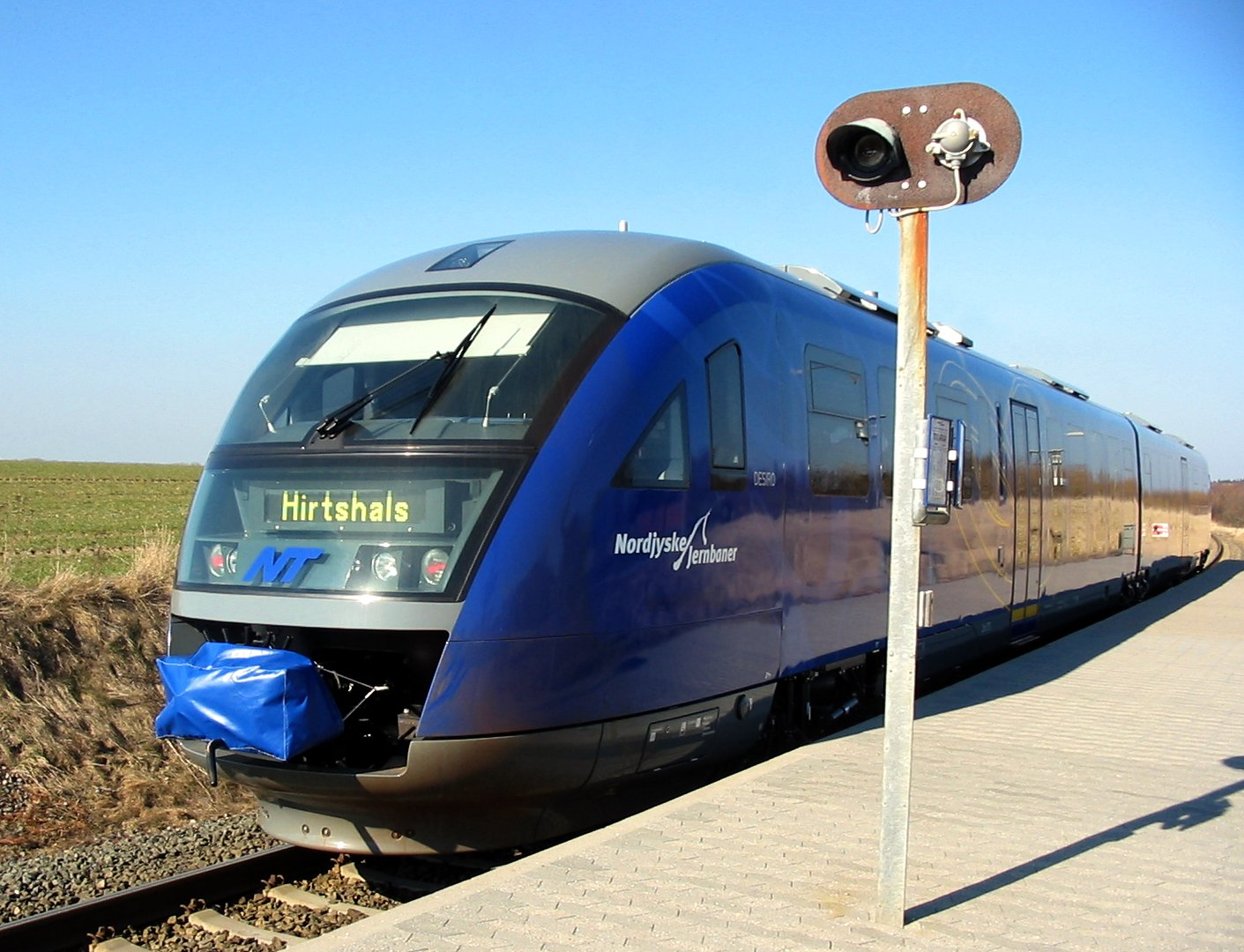
A NJ Siemens Desiro DMU

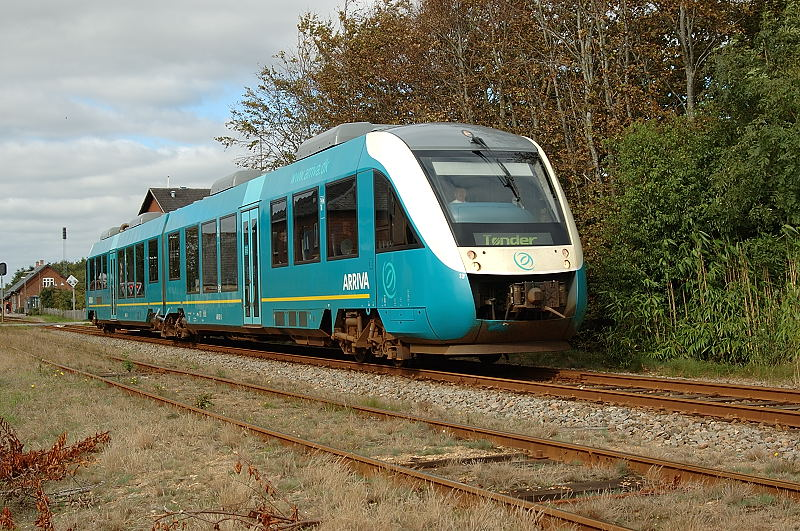
An Arriva Denmark Alstom Coradia LINT train in September 2007

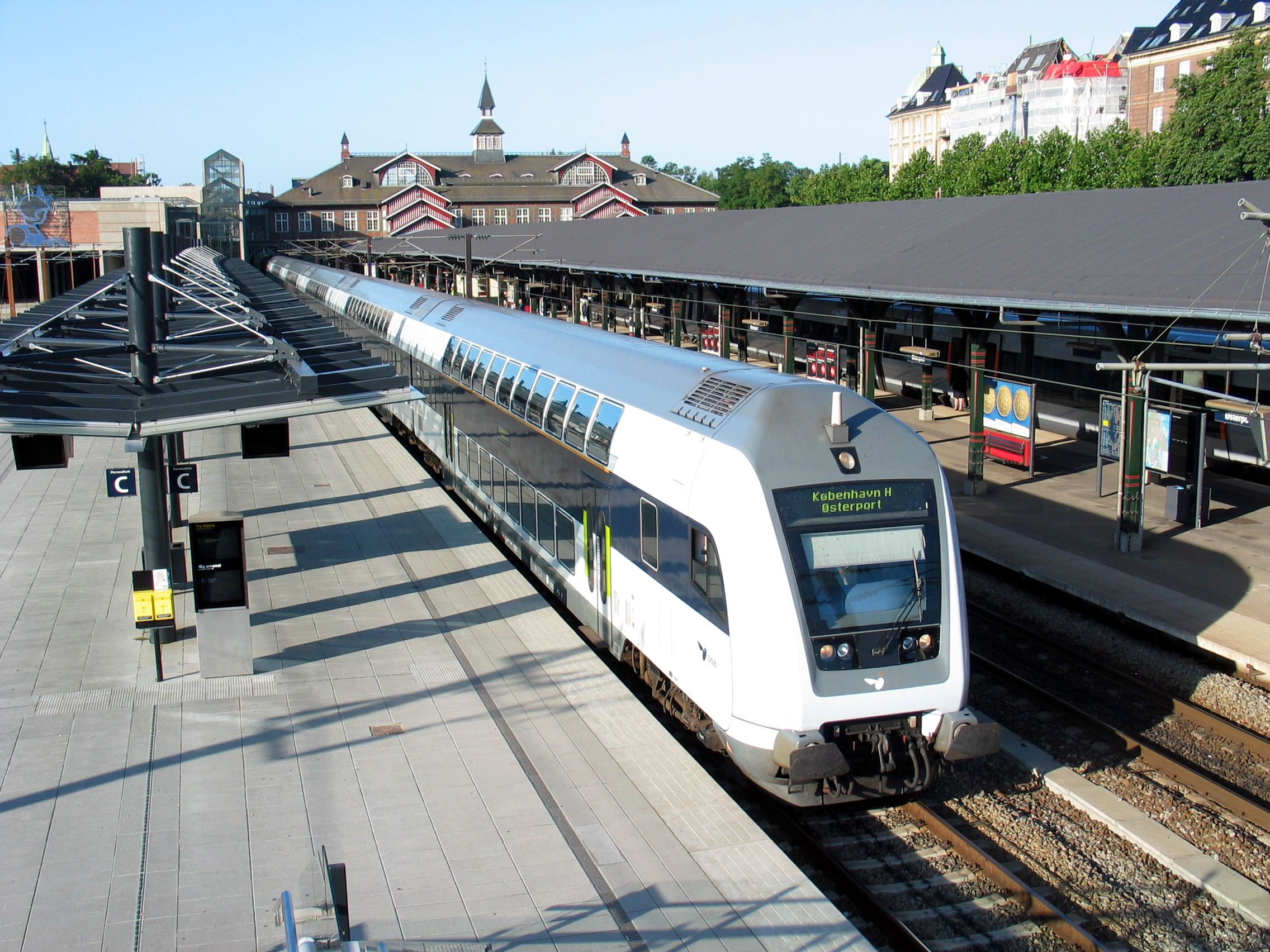
A Bombardier Double-deck Coach at Østerport station in January 2005

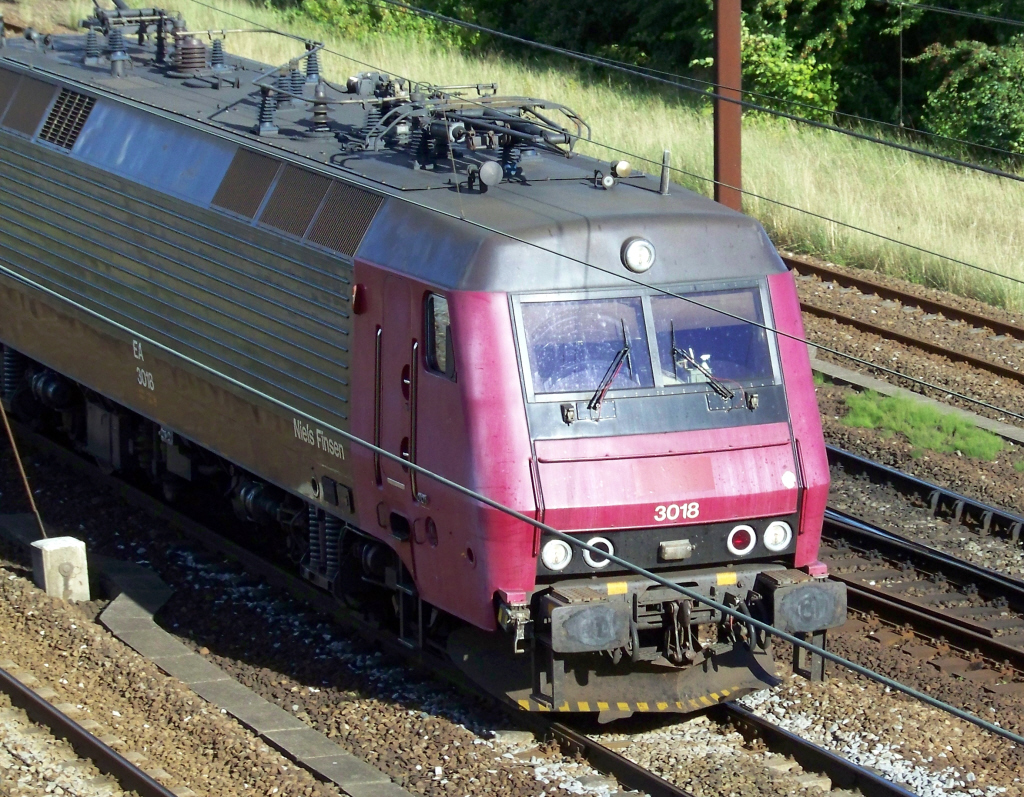
An EA class electric locomotive in operation with Railion

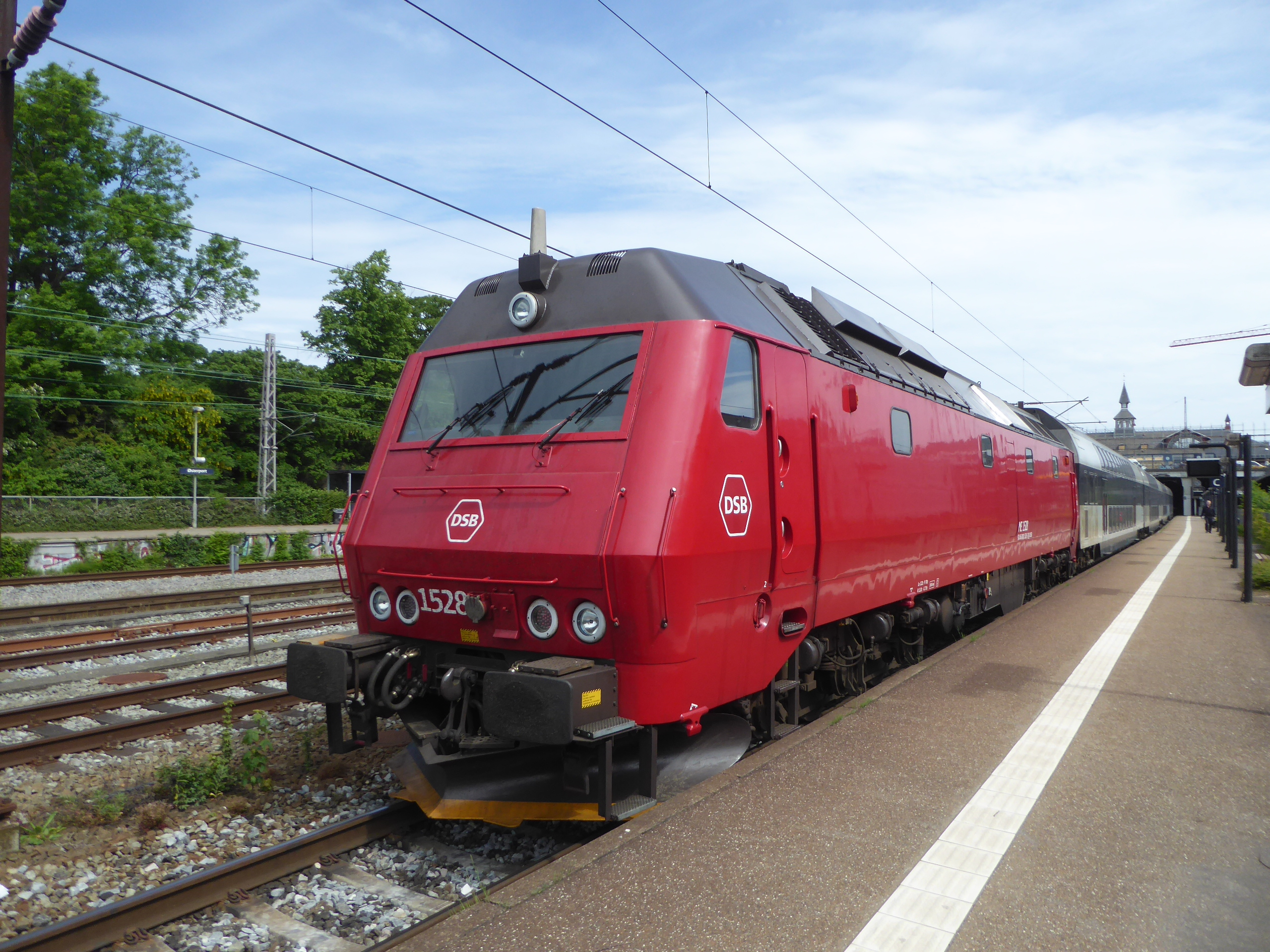
A ME class diesel-electric locomotive at Østerport station

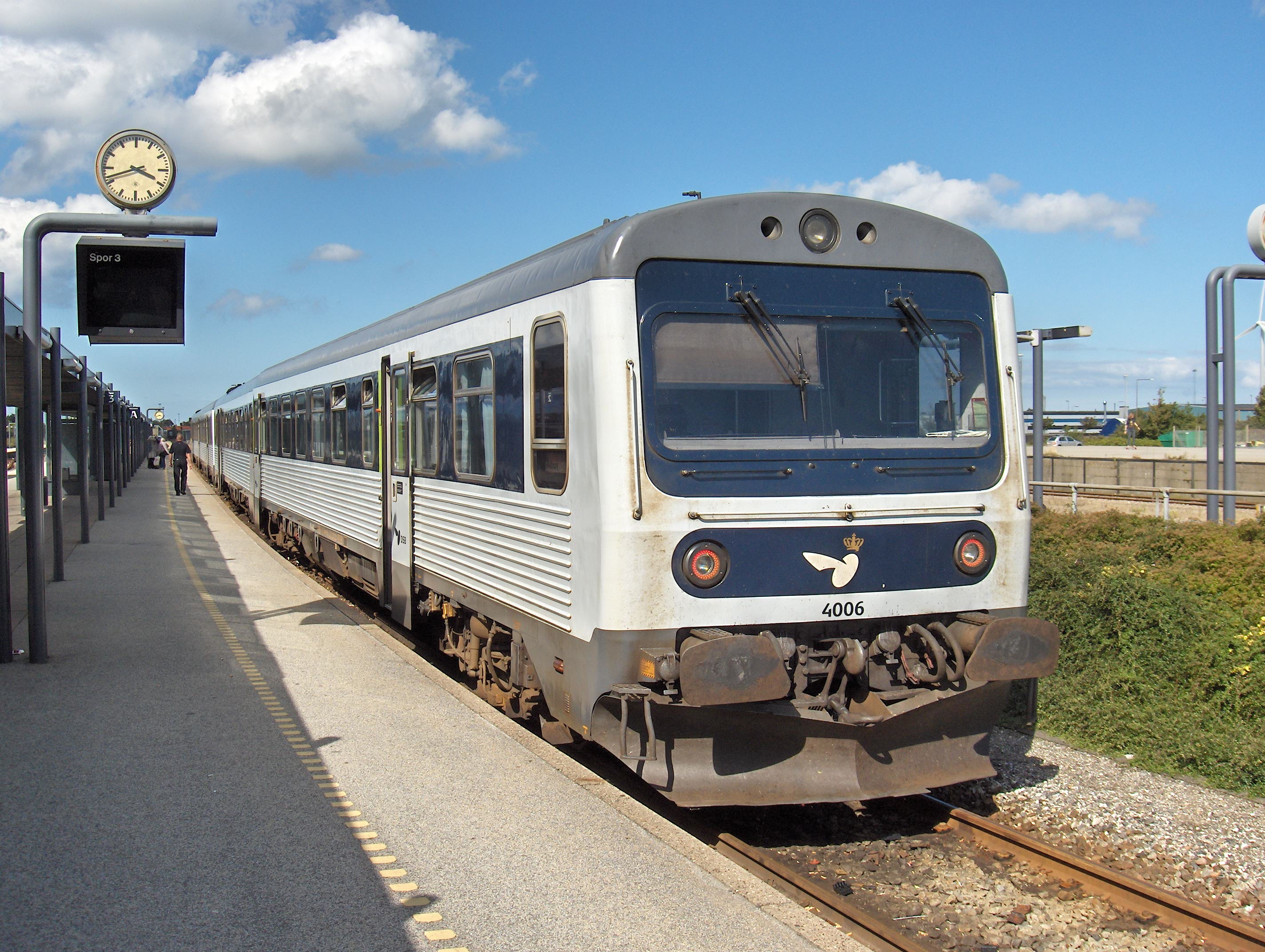
MR class diesel multiple unit

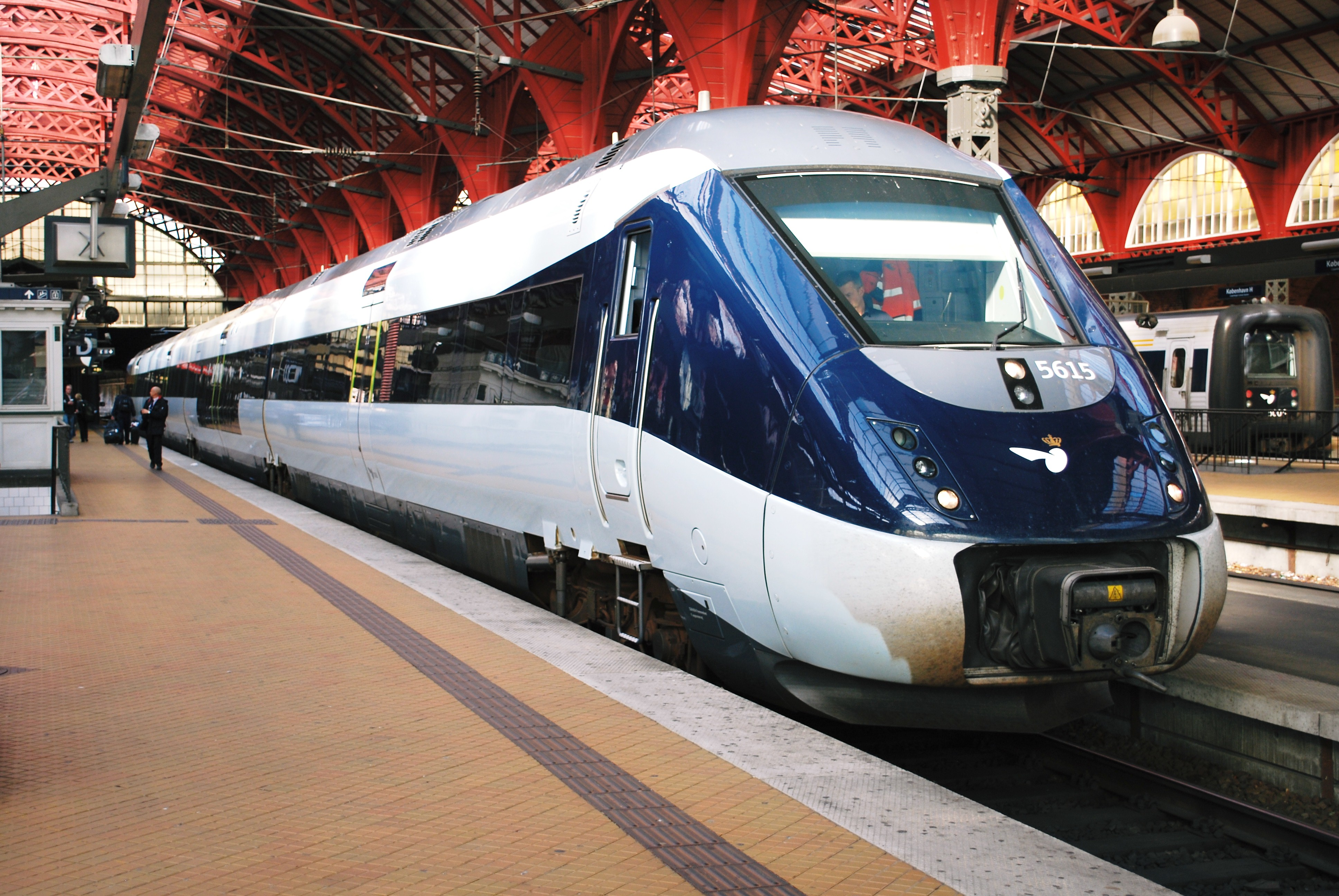
An IC4 class DMU at Copenhagen Central Station in October 2009

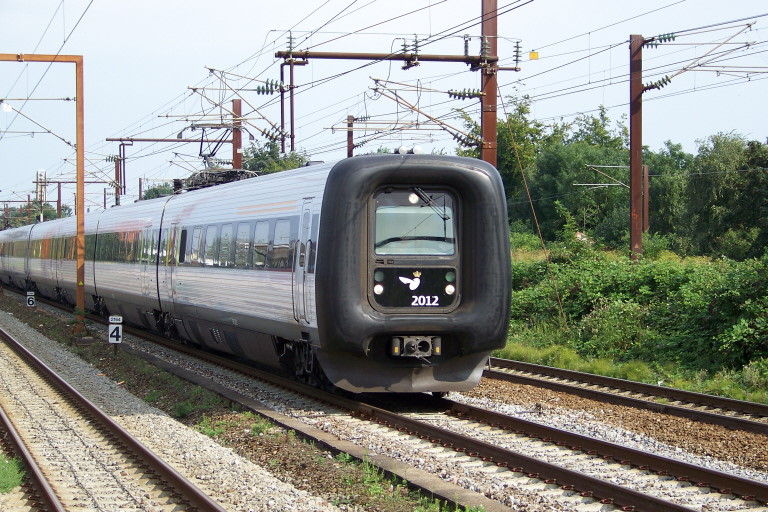
An IR4 EMU train passing Hvidovre Fjern near Copenhagen

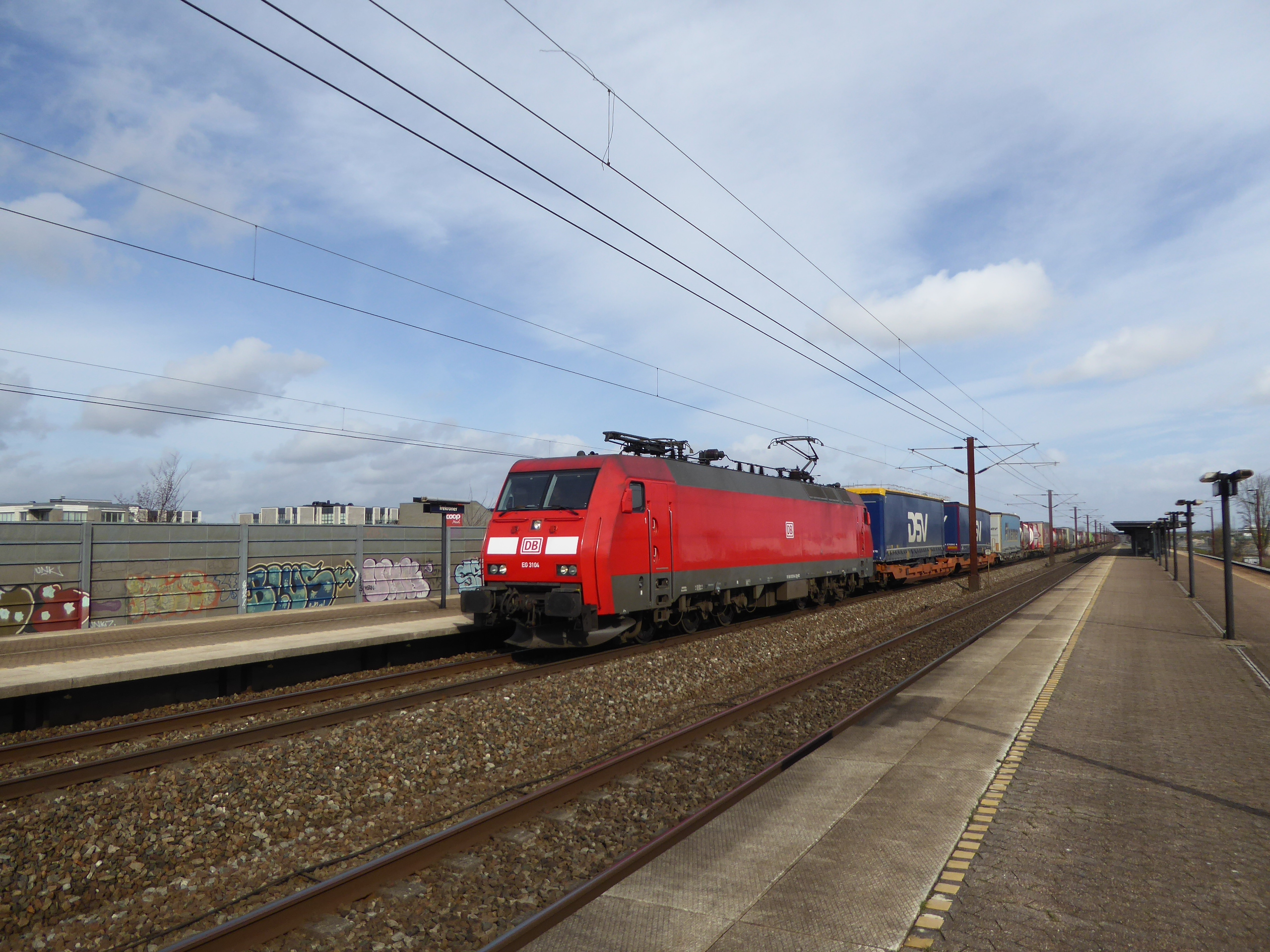
A freight train from DB Cargo Scandinavia passing Trekroner Station.

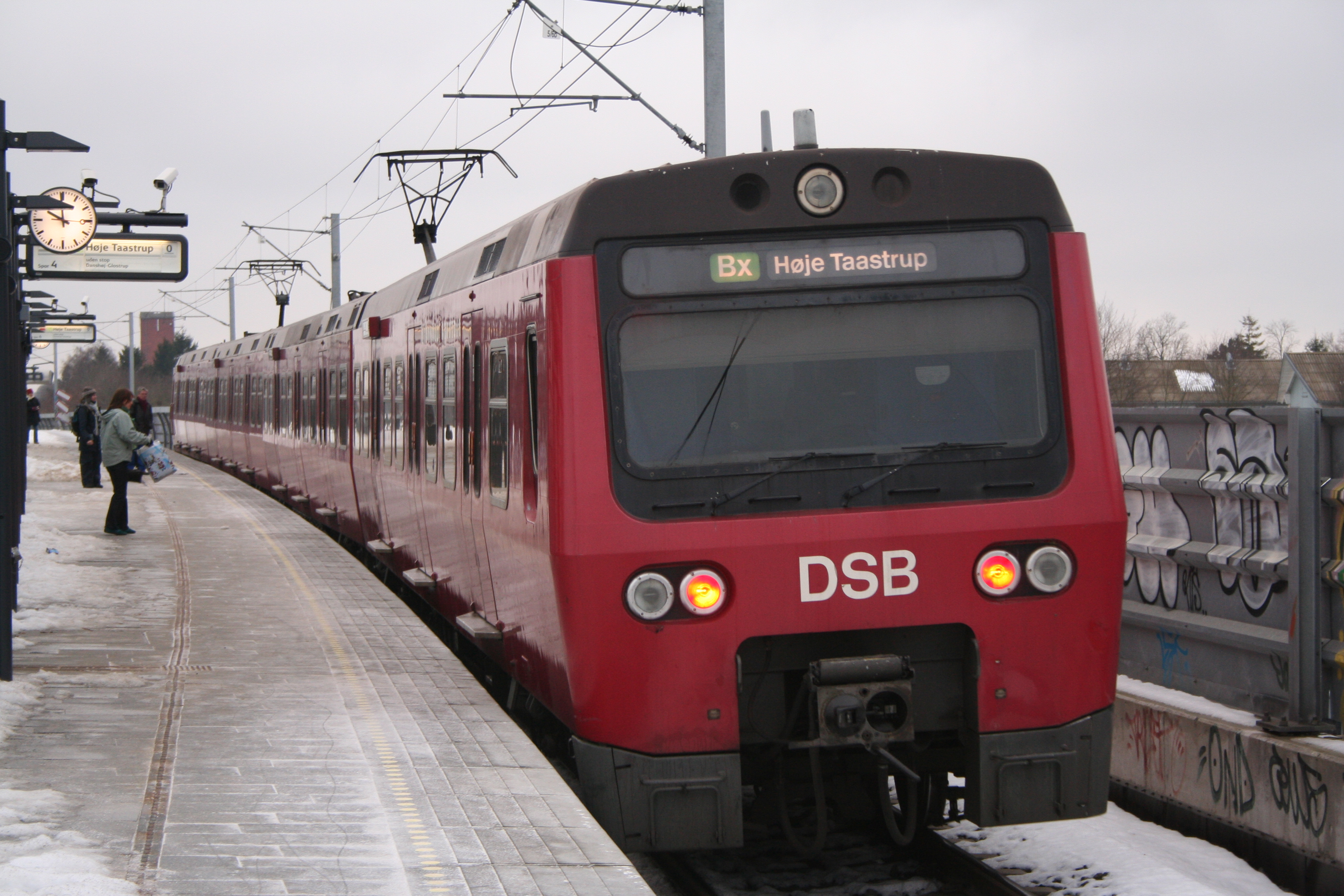
A third-generation S-train, 2006

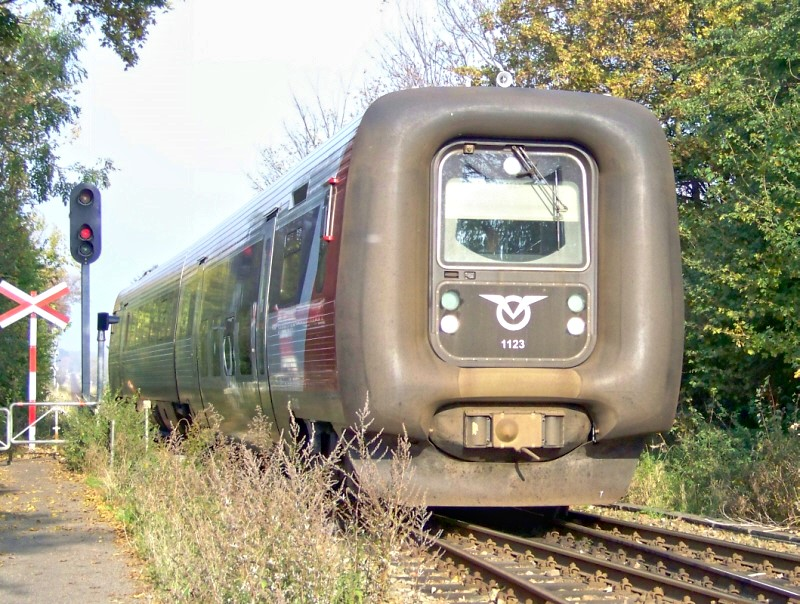
An IC2 train.

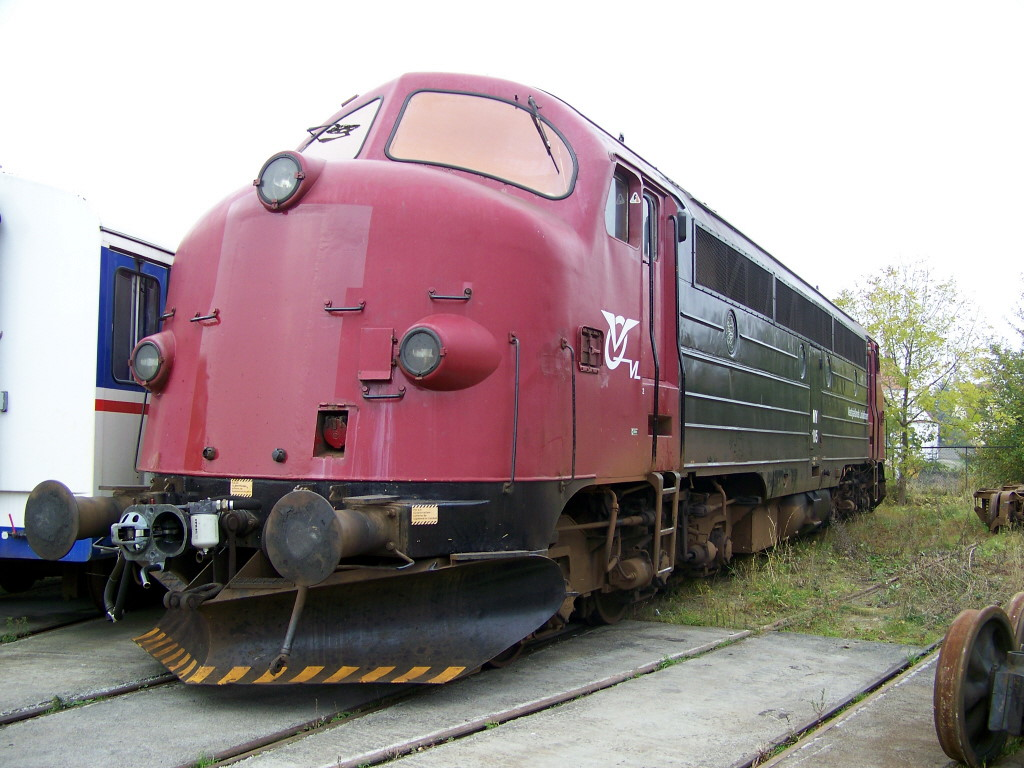
A MY class diesel locomotive at Holbæk

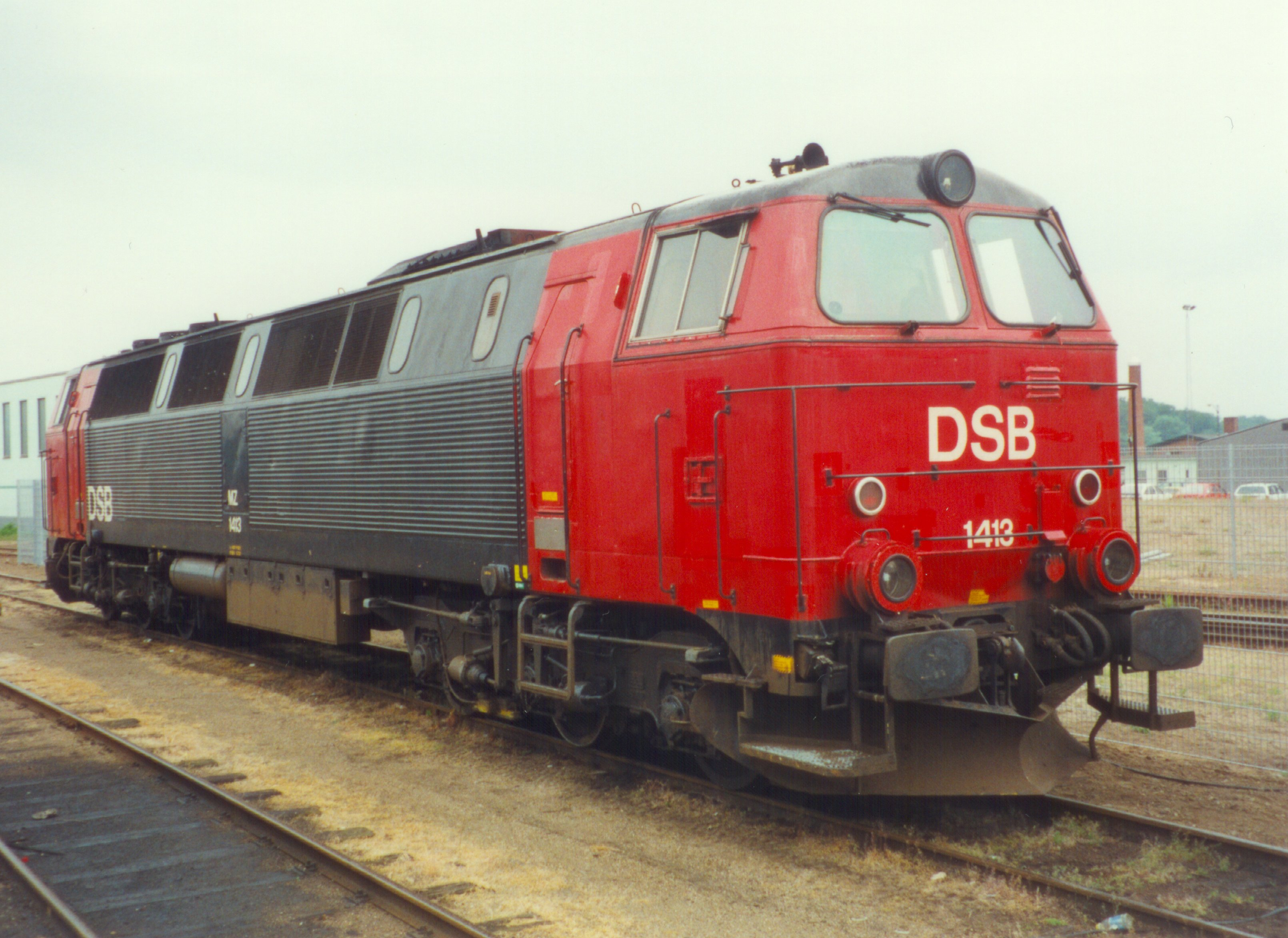
MZ class diesel locomotive in Odense

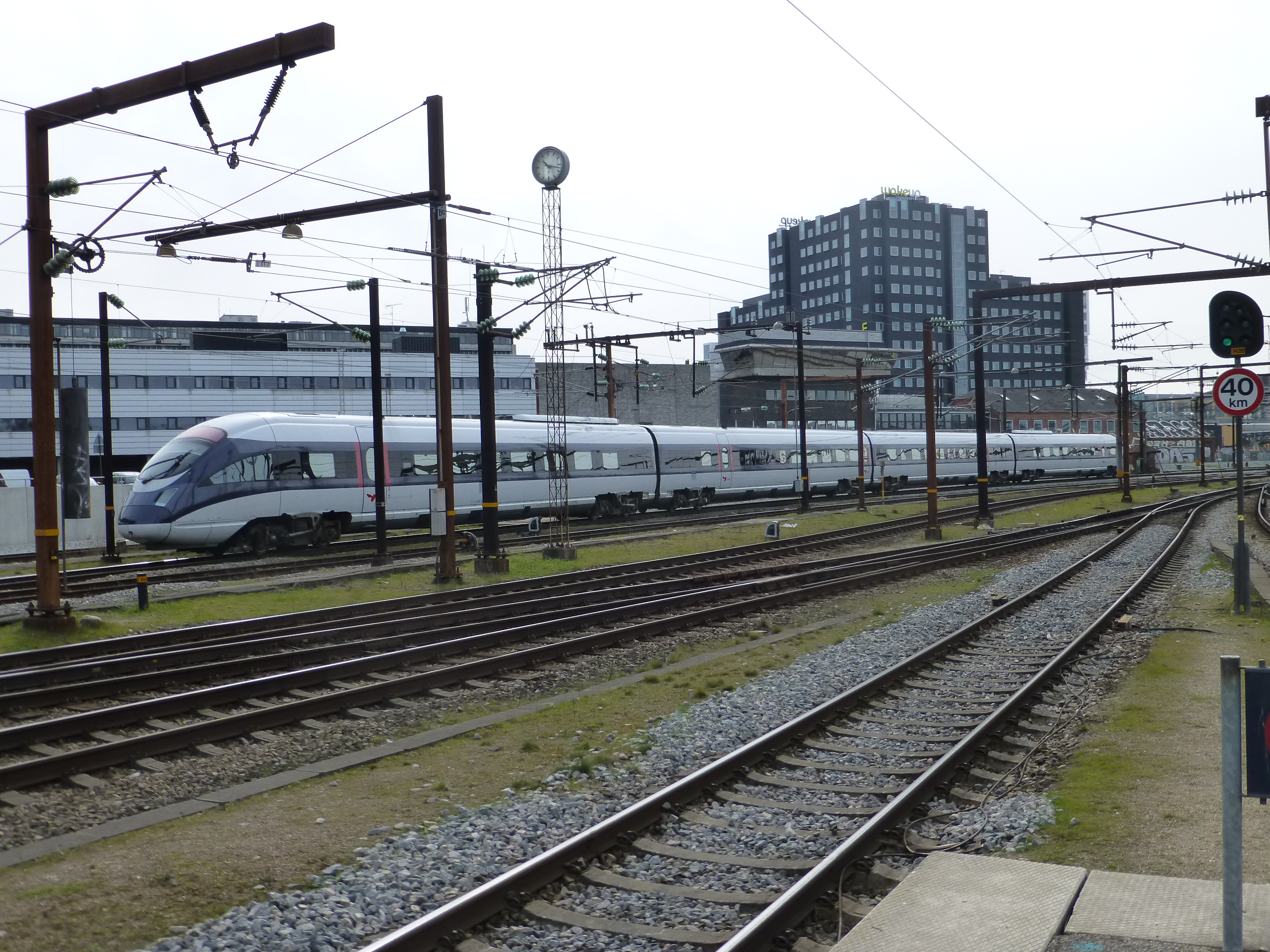
ICE TD trainset in 2014

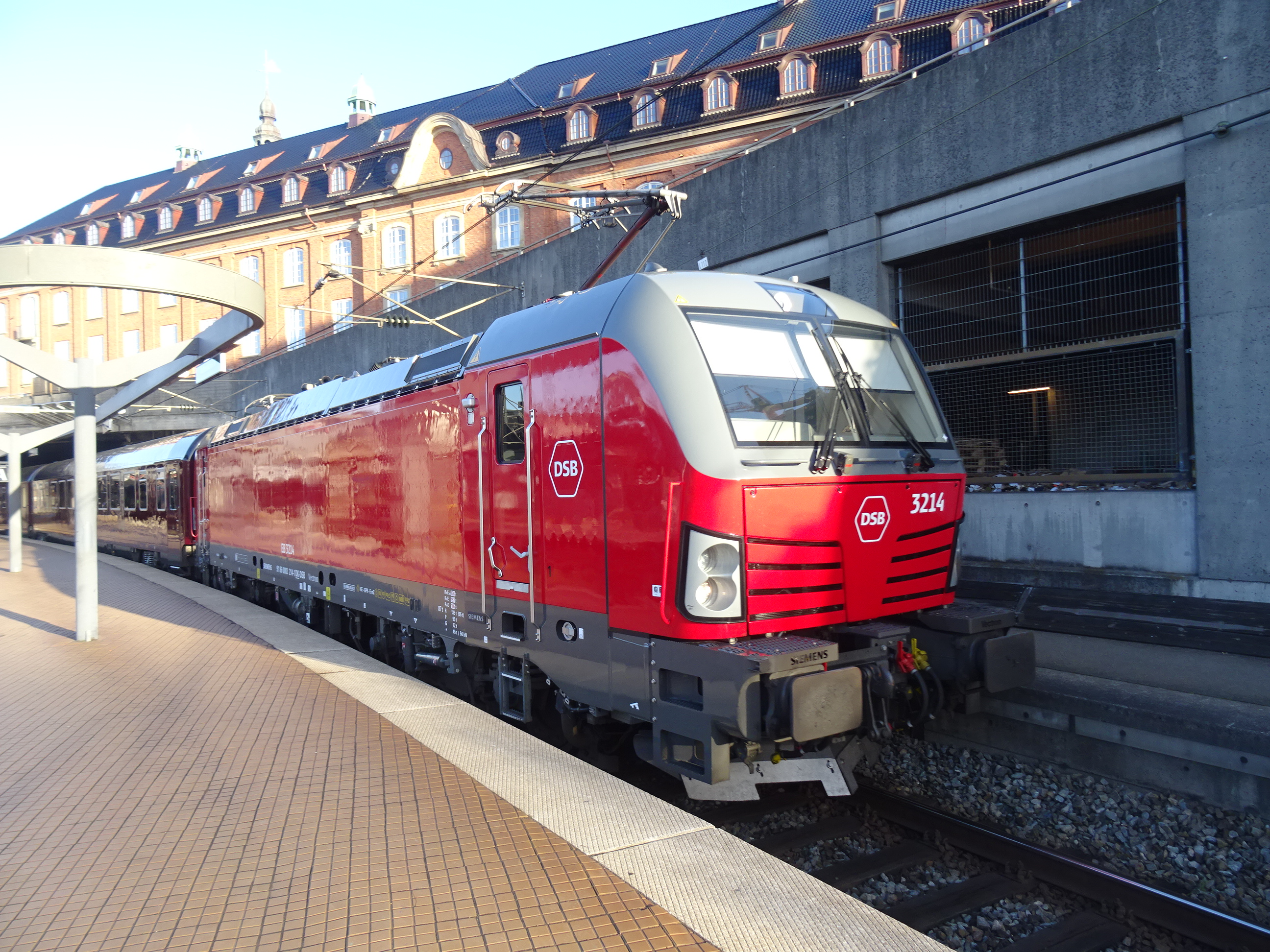
Siemens Vectron electric locomotive, first imported from Germany in 2020

In 2023, UIC-Z-wagons were rented from Deutsche Bahn. In Denmark they are known as IC1 wagons

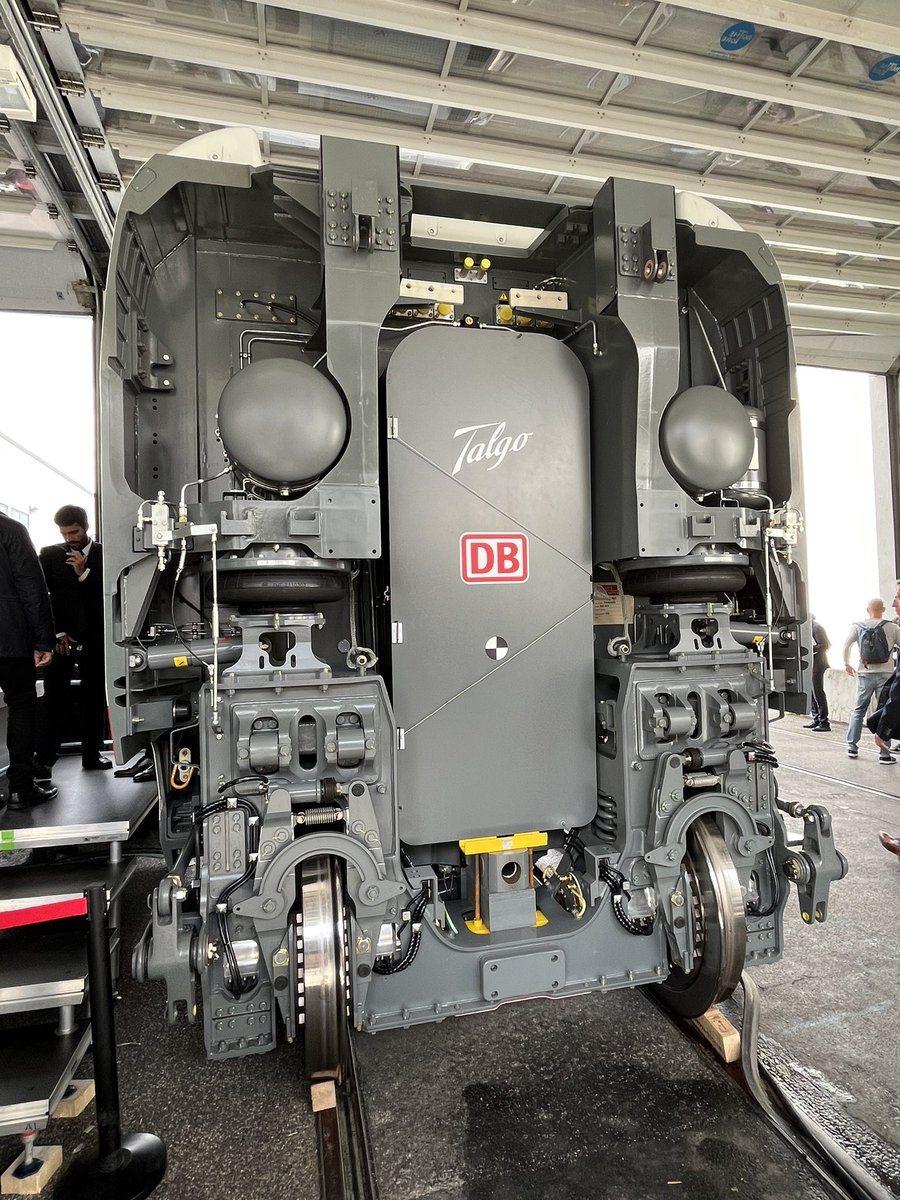
The Talgo 230 is slated for delivery in 2024. It is low-floor throughout and thus handicap-friendly.

== See also ==
- Banedanmark
- History of rail transport in Denmark
- High-speed rail in Denmark
- List of railway lines in Denmark
- List of town tramway systems in Denmark
- Transportation in Denmark
- Rail transport by country
