= Horneby Sand railway halt =

Railway halt in North Zealand, Denmark

Horneby Sand
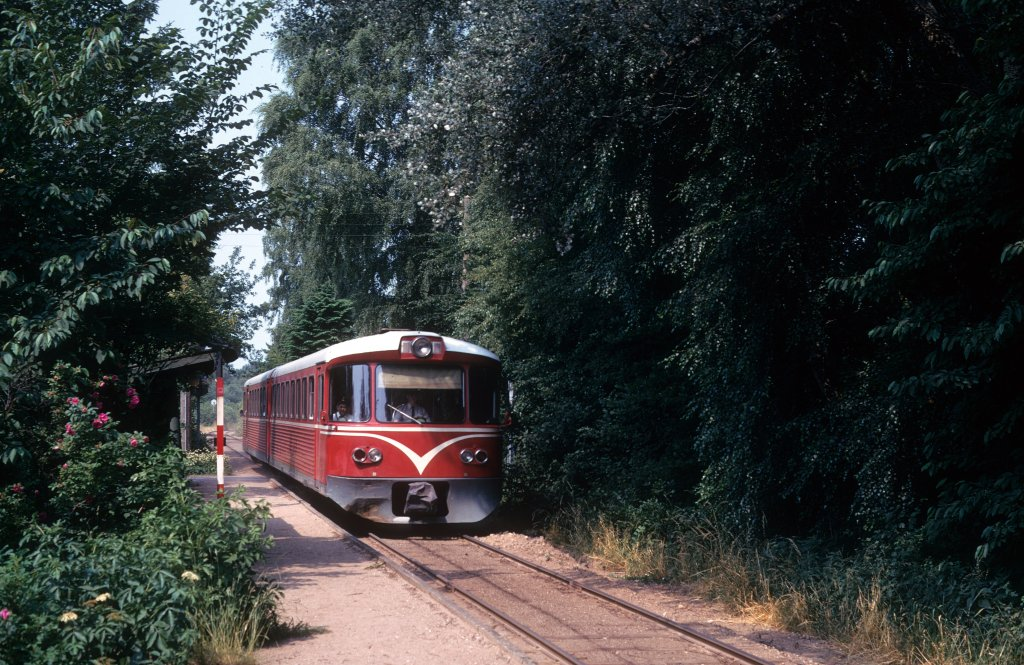
- Horneby Sand halt in 1973

General information
- Location: Tennisvej; 3100 Hornbæk; Helsingør Municipality; Denmark
- Coordinates: 56°05′23.7″N 12°26′08″E
- Elevation: 8.0 metres (26.2 ft)
- System: Railway halt
- Owner: Hovedstadens Lokalbaner
- Operator: Lokaltog
- Line: Hornbæk Line
- Platforms: 1
- Tracks: 1

History
- Opened: 1938

Services
| Preceding station | Lokaltog | Following station |
|---|---|---|
| Hornbæk towards Helsingør | Hornbæk Line Local train | Kildekrog towards Gilleleje |
Location
- Location within Denmark

Horneby Sand halt is a railway halt serving the western part of the seaside resort town of Hornbæk on the north coast of North Zealand, Denmark.

The halt is located on the Hornbæk Line from Helsingør to Gilleleje. The train services are currently operated by the railway company Lokaltog which runs frequent local train services between Helsingør station and Gilleleje station.

== See also ==
- List of railway stations in Denmark
- Rail transport in Denmark
