= 1988 Sorø derailment =

Danish rail disaster

Details
- Date: 25 April 1988; 8:26 (CET)
- Location: Sorø
- Coordinates: 55°25′04.5″N 11°33′20″E
- Country: Denmark
- Line: Aarhus–Odense–Copenhagen
- Operator: DSB
- Service: InterCityLyn
- Incident type: Derailment
- Cause: High speed, insufficient signage.

Statistics
- Trains: 1
- Deaths: 8
- Injured: 72

The Sorø derailment of 25 April 1988 happened when an Intercity train IC104 from Fredericia, Jutland to Copenhagen jumped the rails 800 meters west of the entrance of the station of Sorø, resulting in eight deaths and 72 passengers injured.

== Context ==
The train consisted of the ME locomotive (1535) with seven passenger cars carrying about 300 passengers. It was about five minutes late after the ferry crossing the Storebælt. Due to construction work on the transit track at Sorø, the train was supposed to drive through Sorø station on the passing track.

== Derailment ==
The train reached the points before the western end of Sorø Station at a higher speed than allowed when driving from the through track to the passing tracks (the limit was 40 km/h (25 mph)). According to the accident group's assessment, the speed was not less than 100 km/h (62 mph), which caused the derailment. The locomotive was not equipped with a tachograph, so that the exact speed of the train at the accident could not be determined.

While the locomotive and the first two coaches remained upright, some of the coaches in the train rolled over, with one in particular (the fifth) ending perpendicular to the tracks and with one end having ridden over the fourth coach. A large boulder was discovered to have made considerable damage to the third and fourth coaches, completely smashing five compartments, where most of the deaths occurred.

== Rescue operation ==
The rescue operation following the accident was described as problematic. The various rescue services each used their own radio system and had difficulties communicating. Furthermore, the equipment of first responders was not suited for sizeable accidents, some carrying only axes, circular saws, ladders.

According to the accident report, 8 people were killed and 72 were injured, of which 11 were serious (at the hearing in February 1989, it was stated that 70 were injured, 8 of whom were serious).

== Conviction ==
The driver was convicted on 28 February 1989 for gross negligence on duty causing a railway accident and for a number of other offences of negligence.

== Consequences ==
According to one source, after this accident, the need for development of automatic train control on Danish railways was more clearly understood. Danish State Railways had been evaluating a modern train protection system since 1978. In 1988 they tasked Siemens to create a system for the Danish railway network. Installation was begun in 1992, and by 1996, the ZUB 123 train protection system by Siemens was in effect. By the 2020s, the European Train Control System is planned to replace the legacy system.
