= Automatic train control =

Class of train protection systems for railways

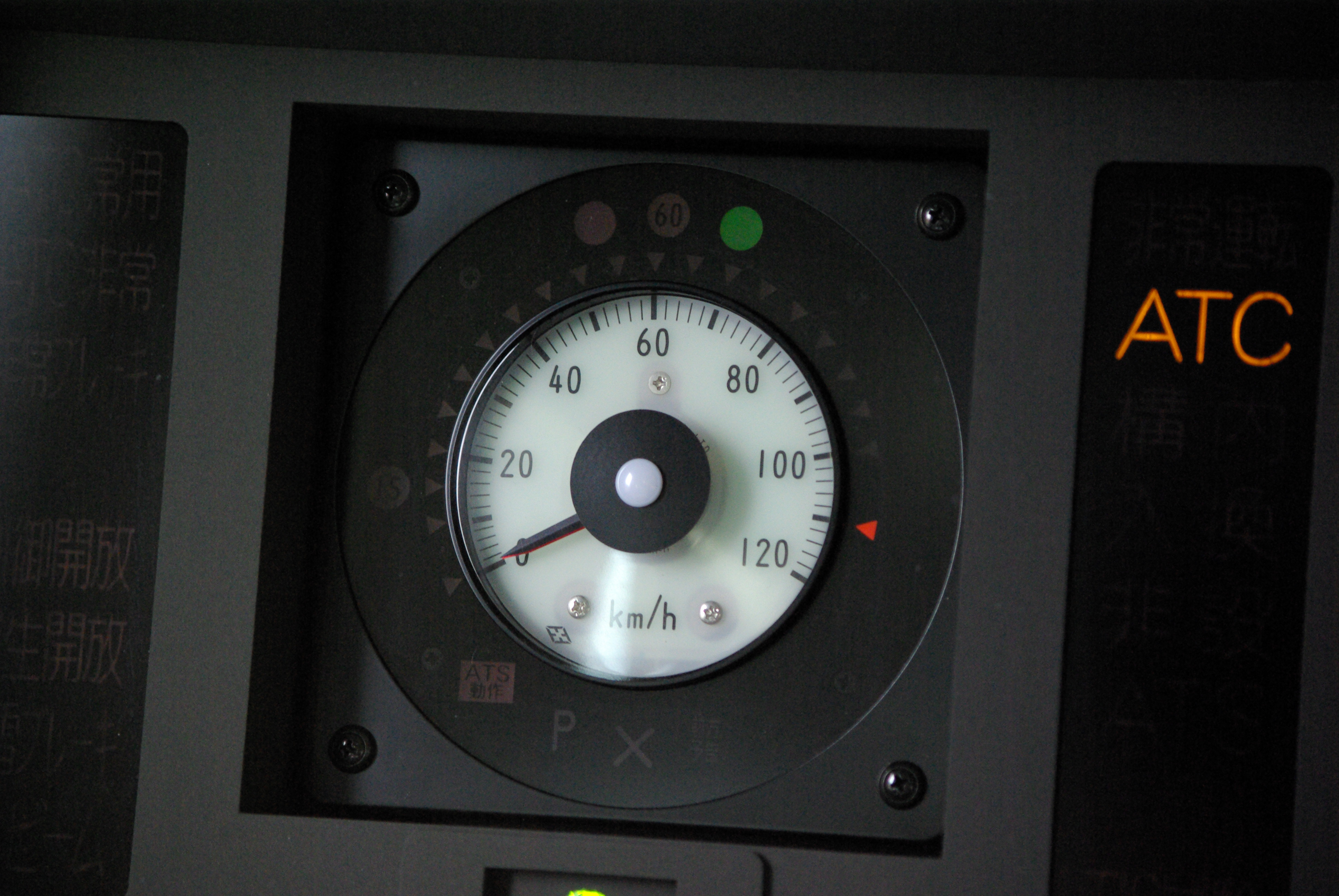
Japanese-style ATC cab signalling indicator

Automatic train control (ATC) is a general class of train protection systems for railways that involves a speed control mechanism in response to external inputs. For example, a system could effect an emergency brake application if the driver does not react to a signal at danger. ATC systems tend to integrate various cab signalling technologies and they use more granular deceleration patterns in lieu of the rigid stops encountered with the older automatic train stop (ATS) technology. ATC can also be used with automatic train operation (ATO) and is usually considered to be the safety-critical part of a railway system.

There have been numerous different safety systems referred to as "automatic train control" over time. The first experimental apparatus was installed on the Henley branch line in January 1906 by the Great Western Railway, although it would now be referred to as an automatic warning system (AWS) because the driver retained full command of braking. The term is especially common in Japan, where ATC is used on all Shinkansen (bullet train) lines, and on some conventional rail and subway lines, as a replacement for ATS.

== Africa ==
=== South Africa ===
In 2017, Huawei was contracted to install GSM-R partly to provide communication services to automatic train protection systems.

== Asia ==
=== Japan ===
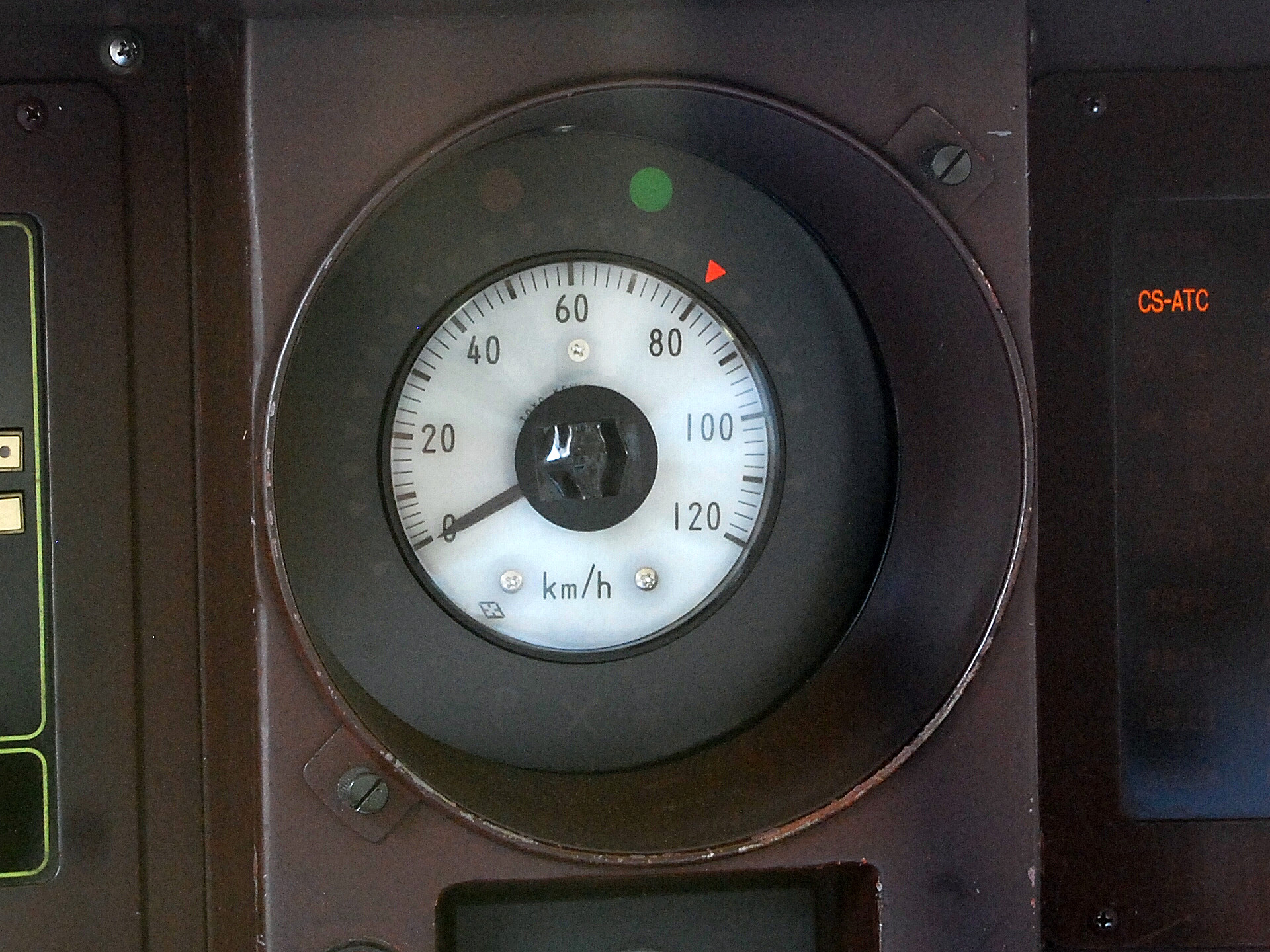
A Tokyu Corporation train with ATC-10 indicator operating under normal conditions

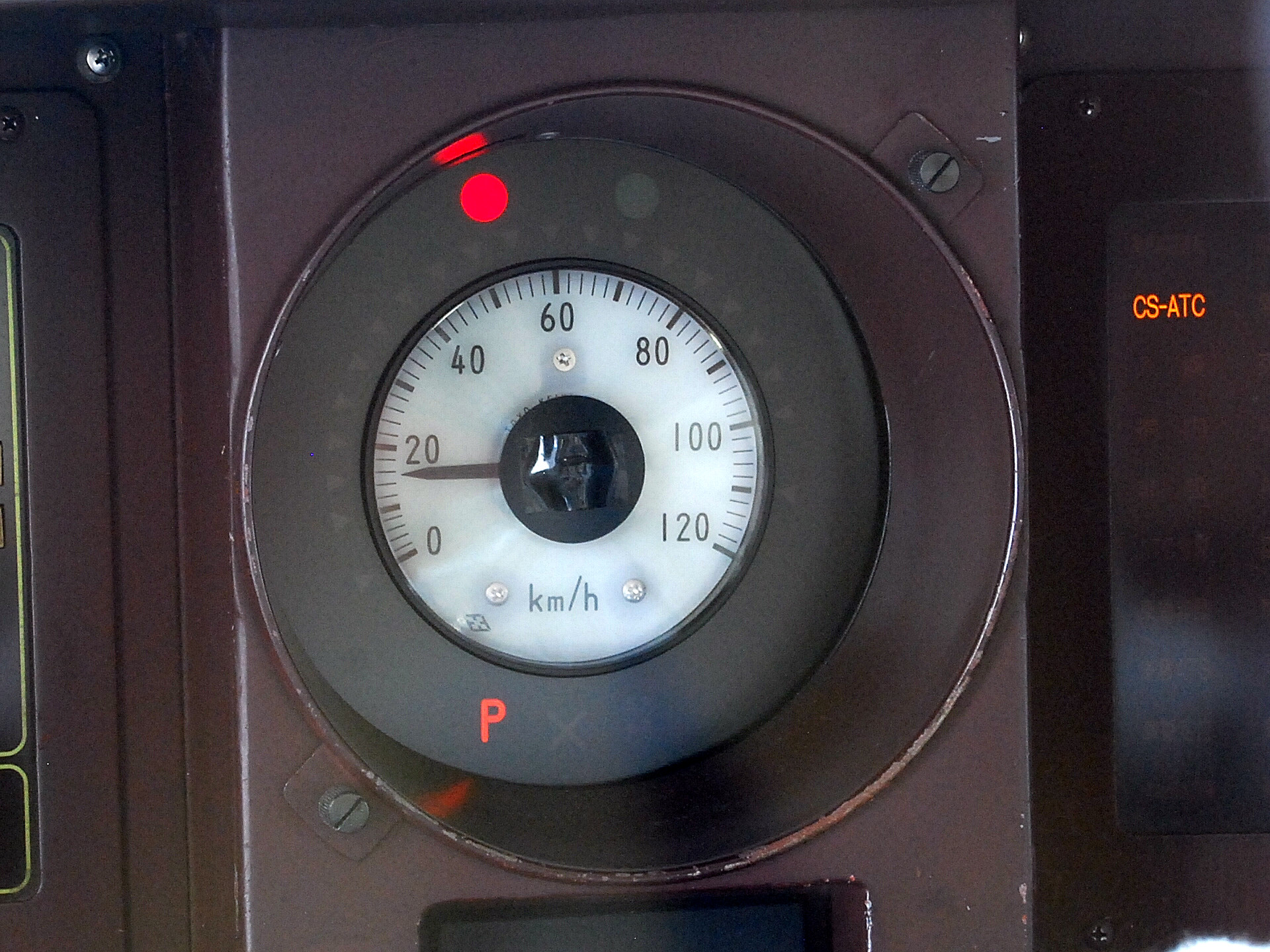
The said ATC-10 indicator with ORP (Over Run Protector) engaged near the end of the ATC coverage area

In Japan, the Automatic Train Control (ATC) system was developed for high-speed trains like the Shinkansen, which travel so fast that the driver has almost no time to acknowledge trackside signals. The ATC system sends AF signals carrying information about the speed limit for the specific track section along the track circuit. When these signals are received on board, the train's current speed is compared with the speed limit and the brakes are applied automatically if the train is travelling too fast. The brakes are released as soon as the train slows below the speed limit. This system offers a higher degree of safety, preventing collisions that might be caused by driver error, so it has also been installed in heavily used lines, such as Tokyo's Yamanote Line and some subway lines.

Although the ATC applies the brakes automatically when the train speed exceeds the speed limit, it cannot control the motor power or train stop position when pulling into stations. However, the automatic train operation (ATO) system can automatically control departure from stations, the speed between stations, and the stop position in stations. It has been installed in some subways.

However, ATC has three disadvantages. First, the headway cannot be increased due to the idle running time between releasing the brakes at one speed limit and applying the brakes at the next slower speed limit. Second, the brakes are applied when the train achieves maximum speed, meaning reduced ride comfort. Third, if the operator wants to run faster trains on the line, all the related relevant wayside and on-board equipment must be changed first.

==== Analogue ATC ====
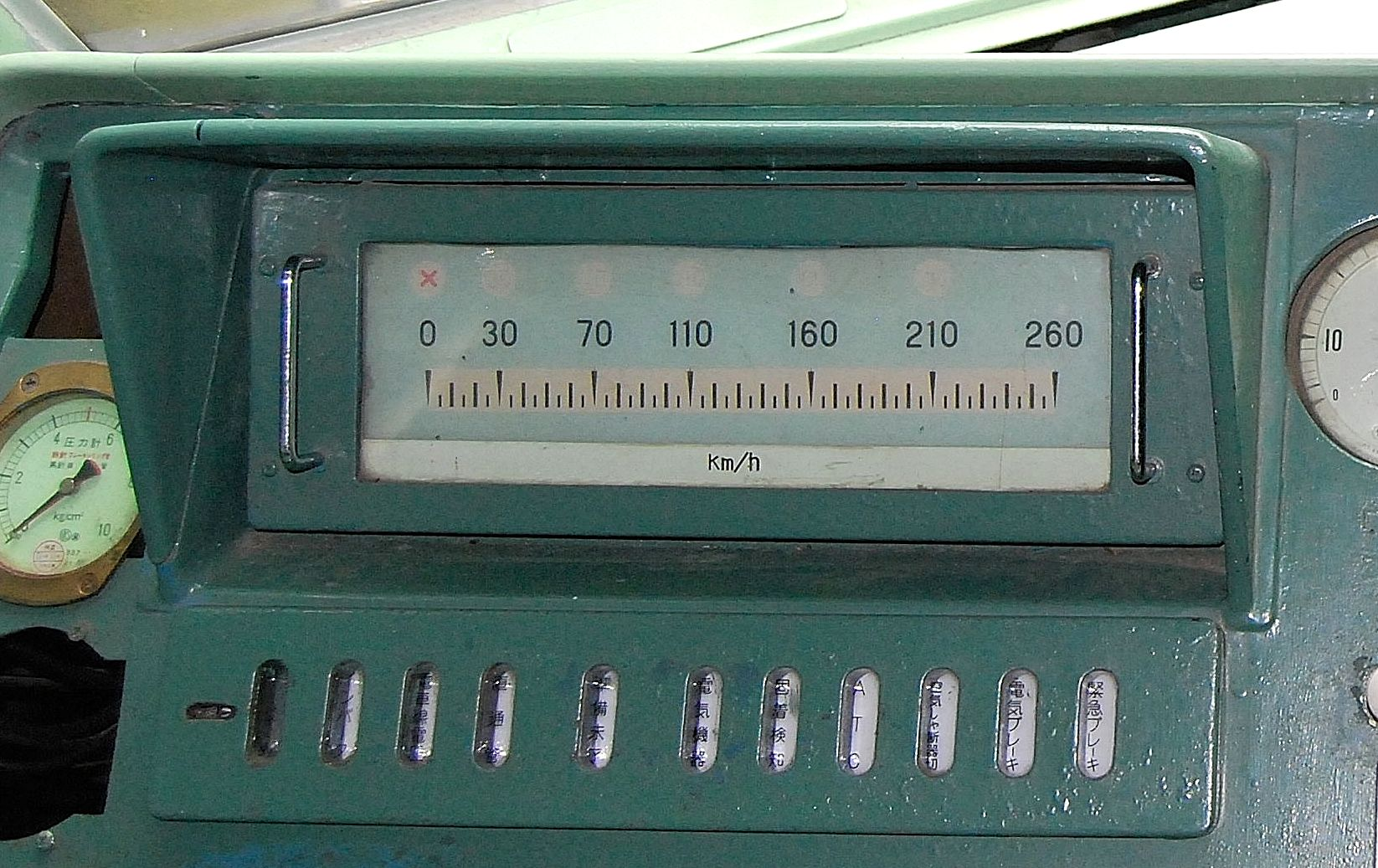
Speedometer in a 0 series driver's cab, showing the ATC cab lights on top of the speed indicators

The following analogue systems have been used:

- ATC-1: ATC-1 is used on the Tōkaidō and Sanyō Shinkansen since 1964. The system used on the Tōkaido Shinkansen is classified as ATC-1A and ATC-1B on the Sanyō Shinkansen. Originally utilizing trackside speed limits of 0, 30, 70, 110, 160 and 210 km/h (0, 19, 43, 68, 99 and 130 mph), it was upgraded to utilize speed limits of 0, 30, 70, 120, 170, 220, 230, 255, 270, 275, 285 and 300 km/h (0, 19, 43, 75, 106, 137, 143, 158, 168, 171, 177 and 186 mph) with the introduction of new rolling stock on both lines. Variants include ATC-1D and ATC-1W, the latter being used exclusively on the Sanyō Shinkansen. Since 2006, the Tōkaidō Shinkansen's ATC-1A system has been superseded by ATC-NS.
- ATC-2: Used on the Tōhoku, Jōetsu and Nagano Shinkansen routes, it utilized 0, 30, 70, 110, 160, 210 and 240 km/h (0, 19, 43, 68, 99, 130 and 149 mph) trackside speed limits. In recent years, ATC-2 has been superseded by the digital DS-ATC. The Japanese ATC-2 system is not to be confused with the Ansaldo L10000 ATC system (also more often known as ATC-2) used in Sweden and Norway, which is similar to the EBICAB 700 and 900 ATC systems used in some other parts of Europe. The analog ATC signal has been proved to be safe, but it only provides the allowable maximum speed on the block section. The speed signal is composed of a primary frequency band between 750 ~ 1000 Hz and a secondary frequency band around 1200 Hz. Speed aspects are encoded using combinations of modulation frequencies ranging from 10.0 to 41.5 Hz and from 12.0 to 38.5 Hz, respectively; the correspondences between these frequencies and the allowed speed are encoded in the truth table below:

ATC-2 FSK signal frequencies and corresponding speed indications
Primary frequency (750Hz - 1000 Hz)	Secondary frequency (1200 Hz)					
Primary frequency (750Hz - 1000 Hz)	12.0 Hz	16.5 Hz	21.0 Hz	27.0 Hz	32.0 Hz	38.5 Hz
10.0 Hz		240 km/h	Switching signal	210 km/h		0 km/h
15.0 Hz		160 km/h	Switching signal			0 km/h
22.0 Hz		110 km/h				0 km/h
29.0 Hz		70 km/h				0 km/h
36.0 Hz		30 km/h				0 km/h
41.5 Hz		0 km/h				0 km/h

A major weak point of ATC-2 is that the system cannot provide different instructions to trains with different brake performances due to the limit of bandwidth and modulation technique. The trains with better brake performances may be asked to decelerate too early, and hence wastes the better efficiency and high performance of new trains while old trains are not retired yet.

- ATC-3 (WS-ATC): Actually the first implementation of ATC in Japan, it was first used on Tokyo Metro Hibiya Line (together with ATO) in 1961 and later on the Tokyo Metro Tōzai Line. Stands for Wayside-ATC. Both lines converted to New CS-ATC (ATC-10) in 2003 and 2007 respectively. WS-ATC is also used on 5 Osaka Metro lines (the Midosuji Line, the Tanimachi Line, the Yotsubashi Line, the Chūō Line and the Sakaisuji Line).
- ATC-4 (CS-ATC): First used on the Tokyo Metro Chiyoda Line (interoperating with JR East Jōban Line) in 1971, CS-ATC (which stands for Cab Signalling-ATC), is an analogue ATC technology using ground-based control, and, like all ATC systems, used cab signalling. CS-ATC uses trackside speed limits of 0, 25, 40, 55, 75 and 90 km/h. Its use has extended to include the Tokyo Metro Ginza Line (CS-ATC introduced in 1993, changed to New CS-ATC), Tokyo Metro Marunouchi Line (CS-ATC introduced in 1998), and most recently, the Tokyo Metro Yurakucho Line (CS-ATC enabled in 2008). It is also used on all Nagoya Municipal Subway lines and 3 Osaka Metro lines (the Sennichimae Line, the Nagahori Tsurumi-ryokuchi Line and the Imazatosuji Line).
- ATC-5: Introduced on the Sōbu Line (Rapid) and the Yokosuka Line from 1972 to 1976, it utilized trackside speed limits of 0, 25, 45, 65, 75 and 90 km/h. ATC-5 was deactivated on both lines in 2004 in favour of ATS-P.
- ATC-6: Introduced in 1972, formerly used on the Saikyō Line, Keihin-Tōhoku Line/Negishi Line (introduced 1984) and Yamanote Line (introduced 1981). Some freight trains were fitted with ATC-6 as well. In 2003 and 2006, the Keihin-Tōhoku and Yamanote Lines replaced their ATC-6 systems with D-ATC. Saikyō Line replaced its ATC-6 system to ATACS in 2017.
- ATC-9: Used on the Chikuhi Line (through service with the Fukuoka City Subway Airport Line) in Kyushu.
- ATC-10 (New CS-ATC): Developed from ATC-4 (CS-ATC), ATC-10 can be partially compatible with D-ATC and completely compatible with the older CS-ATC (ATC-4) technology. ATC-10 can be seen as a hybrid of analogue and digital technology, although ATC-10 is not recommended for use with D-ATC because of poor performance of the full-service brake during trial tests. It is used on all Tokyo Metro lines, the Tōkyū Den-en-toshi Line, Tōkyū Tōyoko Line and Tsukuba Express.
- ATC-L: Used on the Kaikyō Line (inclusive of the Seikan Tunnel section) along with Automatic Train Stop from 1988–2016. Replaced by DS-ATC following opening of the Hokkaido Shinkansen.

==== Digital ATC ====
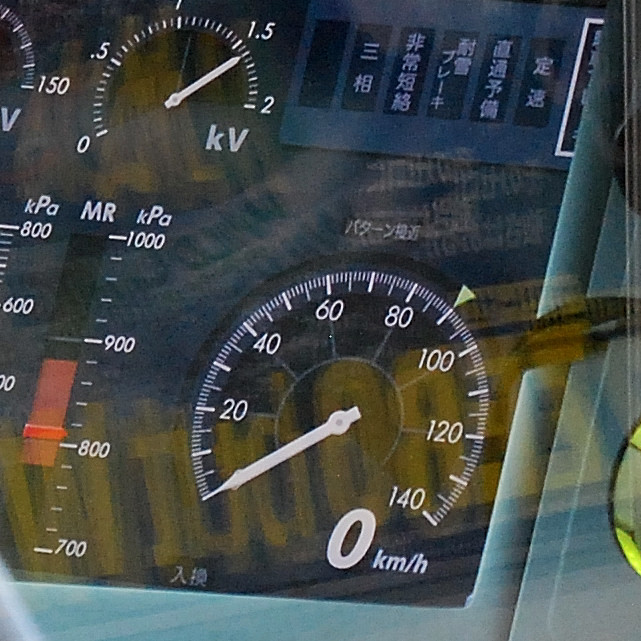
D-ATC indicator used on the E233 series trains

The digital ATC system uses the track circuits to detect the presence of a train in the section and then transmits digital data from wayside equipment to the train on the track circuit numbers, the number of clear sections (track circuits) to the next train ahead, and the platform that the train will arrive at. The received data is compared with data about track circuit numbers saved in the train on-board memory and the distance to the next train ahead is computed. The on-board memory also saves data on track gradients, and speed limits over curves and points. All this data forms the basis for ATC decisions when controlling the service brakes and stopping the train.

In a digital ATC system, the running pattern creates determines the braking curve to stop the train before it enters the next track section ahead occupied by another train. An alarm sounds when the train approaches the braking pattern and the brakes are applied when the braking pattern is exceeded. The brakes are applied lightly first to ensure better ride comfort, and then more strongly until the optimum deceleration is attained. The brakes are applied more lightly when the train speed drops to a set speed below the speed limit. Regulating the braking force in this way permits the train to decelerate in accordance with the braking pattern, while ensuring ride comfort.

There is also an emergency braking pattern outside the normal braking pattern and the ATC system applies the emergency brakes if the train speed exceeds this emergency braking pattern.

The digital ATC system has a number of advantages:

- Use of one-step brake control permits high-density operations because there is no idle running time due to operation delay between brake release at the intermediate speed limit stage.
- Trains can run at the optimum speed with no need to start early deceleration because braking patterns can be created for any type of rolling stock based on data from wayside equipment indicating the distance to the next train ahead. This makes mixed operation of express, local, and freight trains on the same track possible at the optimum speed.
- There is no need to change the wayside ATC equipment when running faster trains in the future.
- Multiple data can be transmitted to the on-broad computers due to its high data transmission rate, which takes advantage of the modern DSP software and hardware technology.

From a bock diagram demonstrating the demodulation system used in TVM430 standard signaling of China national railway, we see the DSP system consists of a band-pass filter, FFT, and searching peak and harmonics in the spectrum. The entire flow starts with sampling the data, adding hamming window, FFT (Fast Fourier Transform), calculating power spectrum, and searching throughout the spectrum to generate the sequence of transmitted signal.

To date, the following digital ATC systems are used:

- D-ATC: Used on non-high speed lines on some East Japan Railway Company (JR East) lines. Stands for Digital ATC. Its main difference from the older analog ATC technology is the shift from ground-based control to train-based control, allowing braking to reflect each train's ability, and improving comfort and safety. The fact that it can also increase speeds and provide for denser timetables is important for Japan's busy railways. The first D-ATC was enabled on the section of track from Tsurumi Station to Minami-Urawa Station on the Keihin-Tohoku Line on 21 December 2003 following the conversion of the 209 series trains there to support D-ATC. The Yamanote Line was also D-ATC enabled in April 2005, following the replacement of all old 205 series rolling stock to the new, D-ATC enabled E231 series trains. There are plans to D-ATC enable the rest of the Keihin-Tohoku line and the Negishi line, pending conversion of onboard and ground-based systems. The ATC system on the Toei Shinjuku Line in use from 14 May 2005 is very similar to D-ATC. Since 18 March 2006, Digital ATC has also been enabled for Tōkaidō Shinkansen, the original Shinkansen owned by Central Japan Railway Company, replacing the old analog ATC system. D-ATC is used with the THSR 700T built for the Taiwan High Speed Rail, which opened in early January 2007.
- DS-ATC: Implemented on Shinkansen lines operated by JR East. Stands for Digital communication & control for Shinkansen-ATC. It is used on the Tōhoku Shinkansen, Hokkaido Shinkansen, Joetsu Shinkansen and the Hokuriku Shinkansen. DS-ATC is proposed to improve the weakness of ATC-2, by sending train messages consisting of the distance to the preceding train, or start point of speed limit, and a block identification number by the through track circuits. The new system for Tohoku, Hokkaido, Joetsu, and Hokkuriku Shinkansen is named DS-ATC. Compared to the old ATC, DS-ATC does not show the speed command directly to the train drivers, the on-board computers evaluate the distance from the preceding train, braking performance, gradient, position, and commands given by the dispatch center.

Two carrier frequencies at 575 Hz and 625 Hz, and MSK modulation are selected for the signal transmission of DS-ATC. For each block section of the tracks, a TDAT (Train Detection and ATC signal Transmitter) is installed to detect whether there is a train in the block and transmit modulated signals to the train. Transmitters are placed at the end of the block towards the direction of the train, and a set of receivers are placed at the other end. The telegram transmitted are modulated by MSK since the MSK signaling is robust for interference and requires little part of the bandwidth. In the meantime, the TDAT detects the position of trains by comparing the demodulated transmitted and received signals at another end of the block section.

As the modulated frequencies are 575±8 Hz and 625±8 Hz, the occupied bandwidth for both primary and secondary frequency channels are 16 Hz, and a maximum data transmission rate of 64bit/s is achieved. The TDAT feeds the signal in the track circuits, and the trains receive the signals by a pair of pick-up coils that generate induction current from the magnetic field of the tracks. There are five types of telegrams transmitted to the trains. Their items and length of each sequence are listed on the table below.

Type	Items	Length (bits)
1	Bit sequence to identify the edge of block sections	24
2	ID number of the block section, speed limit, number of unblocked sections, etc.	64
3	Increased number of unblocked sections	34
4	Decreased number of unblocked sections	34
5	Permissible speed, length, and average gradient in the block	44

Once a train calls 5060B, for example, enters a block, the type 1 telegram is received, and the train identifies the moment as the edge of a block. The time delay between the train enters the block and the on-board computer demodulated the type 1 telegram is a Gaussian distribution based on test runs near Niigata in late 1990s. The mean value and the standard deviation are 514ms and 29.2 respectively, and that means the average edge detection error is 39.26m under a maximum operational speed of 275 km/h. When TDAT senses 5060B entering, it starts to transmit type 2 telegram. Before 5060B leaves the block, the TDAT continues to transmit type 2, unless the number of unblocked sections changes.

A challenge of ATC compared to traditional signal lights is the traction current and thunderstorm. The traction current is supplied to the trains from the overhead cables and returns to the electric substations by the tracks. In other words, there exists a large AC current around 1000A flowing in the tracks. For elevated tracks, the lightning strike near the tracks is a source of EMI, too. Those two may cause a large intermodulation distortion in the track circuits.

The digital encoded ATC is easy to examine with a signal inspection car. With DSP chips, the ATC signal transmission can be collected by an inspection car, the demodulated time domain signals is stored and analyzed on the car by comparing the ideal telegrams in the database and the received telegrams.

- RS-ATC: Used on the Tōhoku, Hokkaido, Hokuriku and Jōetsu Shinkansen at a fallback level from DS-ATC. RS-ATC is similar in principle to GSM-R in that radio signals are used to control the speed limit on trains, as compared to trackside beacons and/or transponders on other types of ATC.
- ATC-NS: First used on the Tōkaidō Shinkansen since 2006, ATC-NS (which stands for ATC-New System), is a digital ATC system based on DS-ATC. Also used on the Taiwan High Speed Railway and the San'yō Shinkansen.
- KS-ATC: Used on the Kyushu Shinkansen since 2004. Stands for Kyushu Shinkansen-ATC.

==== ATACS ====
ATACS is a moving block ATC system similar to CBTC, developed by RTRI and first implemented by JR East on the Senseki Line in 2011, followed by the Saikyō Line in 2017, and the Koumi Line in 2020. It is considered to be Japan's equivalent to ETCS Level 3.

=== South Korea ===
Several subway lines in South Korea use ATC, in some cases enhanced with ATO.

==== Busan ====
All lines use ATC. All lines are enhanced with ATO.

==== Seoul ====
Other than on Lines 1 and 2 (MELCO cars only), all lines use ATC. Line 2 (VVVF cars), Line 5 cars, Line 6 cars, Line 7 cars, and Line 8 cars have their ATC systems enhanced with ATO.

== Europe ==
=== Denmark ===
Denmark's system of ATC (officially designated ZUB 123) is different from that of its neighbours. From 1978 until 1987, the Swedish ATC system was trialled in Denmark, and a new Siemens-designed ATC system was implemented between 1986 and 1988. In consequence of the Sorø railway accident, which occurred in April 1988, the new system was progressively installed on all Danish main lines from the early 1990s onwards. Some trains (such as those employed on the Øresundståg service and some X 2000 trains) have both the Danish and the Swedish systems, while others (e.g. ten of the ICE-TD trains) are fitted with both the Danish and the German systems. The ZUB 123 system is now considered by Banedanmark, the Danish railway infrastructure company, to be obsolete and the entire Danish rail network is expected to be converted to ETCS Level 2 by 2030.

The ZUB 123 system is however not used on the Copenhagen S-train commuter network, where another, incompatible safety system called HKT (da:Hastighedskontrol og togstop) had been in use from 1975–2022, as well as on the Hornbæk Line, which uses a much more simplified ATP system introduced in 2000. All aforementioned systems are gradually being replaced by the modern and worldwide CBTC signalling standard as of 2026.

=== Norway ===
Bane NOR—the Norwegian government's agency for railway infrastructure—uses the Swedish system of ATC. Trains can therefore generally cross the border without being specially modified. However, unlike in Sweden, the ATC system used in Norway differentiates between partial ATC (delvis ATC, DATC), which ensures that a train stops whenever a red signal is passed, and full ATC (FATC), which, in addition to preventing overshooting red signals, also ensures that a train does not exceed its maximum allowed speed limit. A railway line in Norway can have either DATC or FATC installed, but not both at the same time.

ATC was first trialled in Norway in 1979, after the Tretten train disaster, caused by a signal passed at danger (SPAD), occurred four years earlier. DATC was first implemented on the section Oslo S - Dombås - Trondheim - Grong between 1983 and 1994, and FATC was first implemented on the Ofoten Line in 1993. The high-speed Gardermoen Line has had FATC since its opening in 1998. After the Åsta accident occurred in 2000, the implementation of DATC on the Røros Line was accelerated, and it became operational in 2001.

=== Sweden ===
In Sweden the development of ATC started in the 1960s (ATC-1), and was formally introduced in the early-1980s together with high-speed trains (ATC-2/Ansaldo L10000). As of 2008, 9,831 km out of the 11,904 km of track maintained by Swedish Transport Administration—the Swedish agency responsible for railway infrastructure—had ATC-2 installed. However, since ATC-2 is generally incompatible with ERTMS/ETCS (as in the case of the Bothnia Line which is the first railway line in Sweden to exclusively use ERTMS/ETCS), and with the aim of Trafikverket to eventually replace ATC-2 with ERTMS/ETCS over the next few decades, a Special Transmission Module (STM) has been developed to automatically switch between ATC-2 and ERTMS/ETCS.

=== United Kingdom ===
In 1906, the Great Western Railway in the UK developed a system known as "automatic train control". In modern terminology, GWR ATC is classified as an automatic warning system (AWS). This was an intermittent train protection system that relied on an electrically energised (or unenergised) rail between, and higher than, the running rails. This rail sloped at each end and was known as an ATC ramp and would make contact with a shoe on the underside of the passing locomotive.

The ramps were provided at distant signals. A development of the design, intended for use at stop signals, was never implemented.

If the signal associated with the ramp was at caution, the ramp would not be energised. The ramp would lift the shoe on the passing locomotive and start a timer sequence at the same time sounding a horn on the footplate. If the driver failed to acknowledge this warning within a preset time, the brakes of the train would be applied. In testing, the GWR demonstrated the effectiveness of this system by sending an express train at full speed past a distant signal at caution. The train was brought safely to a stand before reaching the home signal.

If the signal associated with the ramp was clear, the ramp was energised. The energized ramp would lift the shoe on the passing locomotive and cause a bell to sound on the footplate.

If the system were to fail then the shoe would remain unenergised, the caution state; it therefore failed safe, a fundamental requirement of all safety equipment.

The system had been implemented on all GWR main lines, including Paddington to Reading, by 1908. The system remained in use until the 1970s, when it was superseded by the British Rail Automatic Warning System (AWS).

== North America ==
=== Canada ===
In 2017, the Toronto Transit Commission began the implementation of ATC on to Line 1 Yonge–University, at a cost of $562.3 million. Awarding the contract to Alstom in 2009, the TTC would be able to reduce the headway between trains on Line 1 during rush hours, and allow an increase in the number of trains operating on Line 1. Work however did not begin until the delivery of Toronto Rockets with ATC compatibility and the retirement of older rolling stock that was not compatible with the new system. ATC was introduced in phases, beginning with a test on 4 November 2017 during regular service between Dupont and Yorkdale stations. It was first introduced in a permanent manner with the opening of the Toronto–York Spadina subway extension on 17 December 2017, between Vaughan and Sheppard West stations. Implementation of the system on to the remainder of the line was carried out during weekend closures and night time work when the subway would close. There were delays on the project, with deadlines for the complete conversion of Line 1 pushed back multiple times until 2022. ATC conversion was completed to Finch station on 24 September 2022. Converting all of Line 1 to ATC required the installation of 2,000 beacons, 256 signals, and more than one million feet of cable. ATC is also used on Line 5 Eglinton, however, Unlike on Line 1, the system on Line 5 is supplied by Bombardier Transportation using its Cityflo 650 technology. The TTC plans to convert Line 2 Bloor-Danforth and Line 4 Sheppard to ATC in the future, subject to funding availability and being able to replace the current non-ATC compatible fleet on Line 2 with trains that are, with an estimated date of completion by 2030.

=== United States ===
ATC systems in the United States are almost always integrated with existing continuous cab signalling systems. The ATC comes from electronics in the locomotive that implement some form of speed control based on the inputs of the cab signalling system. If the train speed exceeds the maximum speed allowed for that portion of track, an overspeed alarm sounds in the cab. If the engineer fails to reduce speed and/or make a brake application to reduce speed a penalty brake application is made automatically. Due to the more sensitive handling and control issues with North American freight trains, ATC is almost exclusively applied to passenger locomotives in both inter-city and commuter service with freight trains making use of cab signals without speed control. Some high-volume passenger railroads such as Amtrak, Metro North and the Long Island Rail Road require the use of speed control on freight trains that run on all or part of their systems.

While cab signalling and speed control technology has existed since the 1920s, adoption of ATC only became an issue after a number of serious accidents several decades later. The Long Island Rail Road implemented its Automatic Speed Control system within its cab signalled territory in the 1950s after a pair of deadly accidents caused by ignored signals. After the Newark Bay Lift Bridge Disaster the state of New Jersey legislated use of speed control on all major passenger train operators within the State. While speed control is used on many passenger lines in the United States, in most cases it has been adopted voluntarily by the railroads that own the lines.

Only three freight railroads, Union Pacific, Florida East Coast and CSX Transportation, have adopted any form of ATC on their own networks. The systems on both FEC and CSX work in conjunction with pulse code cab signals, which in the case of CSX was inherited from the Richmond, Fredericksburg and Potomac railroad on its single main line. Union Pacific's was inherited on portions of the Chicago and Northwestern east–west main line and works in conjunction with an early two aspect cab signaling system designed for use with ATC. On CSX and FEC more restrictive cab signal changes require the engineer to initiate a minimum brake application or face a more severe penalty application that will bring the train to a stop. Neither system requires explicit speed control or adherence to a braking curve. The Union Pacific system requires an immediate brake application that cannot be released until the train's speed has been reduced to 40 mph (64 km/h) (for any train traveling above that speed). Then, the train's speed must be further reduced to no more than 20 mph (32 km/h) within 70 seconds of the initial cab signal drop. Failure to apply the brakes for these speed reductions will result in a penalty application.

All three freight ATC systems provide the engineer with a degree of latitude in applying brakes in a safe and proper manner, since improper braking can result in a derailment or a runaway. None of the systems are in effect in difficult or mountainous terrain.

Automatic Train Control (A.T.C.) for high-speed passenger trains was first implemented in 1972 in the San Francisco Bay Area by the "Bay Area Rapid Transit District" (B.A.R.T.D.). Their system was the first of its kind to utilize complex electronic circuitry and computer control for the daily operation of trains. The primary control system is designed so that normal acceleration and deceleration of vehicles is accomplished in a fully automated manner through transmittal of binary encoded speed commands from "wayside" track transmitters to onboard train receivers. Assuming a high degree of electronic hardware reliability, the most critical technical problem is the allocation of adequate stopping distances between trains. Computation of these stopping margins must adequately take into account measurements of train braking performance under a wide variety of rail conditions.

== Oceania ==
=== Australia ===
ATC is used in Queensland between Caboolture and Bundaberg, in addition to ATP. This line is used by the Tilt Train, as well as other freight and passenger services.

ATC was also used on Sydney's Inner West Light Rail until 2015, when the Variotrams were withdrawn from service. The line no longer has any safeguards to prevent human error.

== See also ==
- Anti Collision Device
- Automatic train stop
- Automatische treinbeïnvloeding
- Cab signalling
- Positive train control
- Train protection system
