= DSB Class ME =

Diesel-electric locomotive class

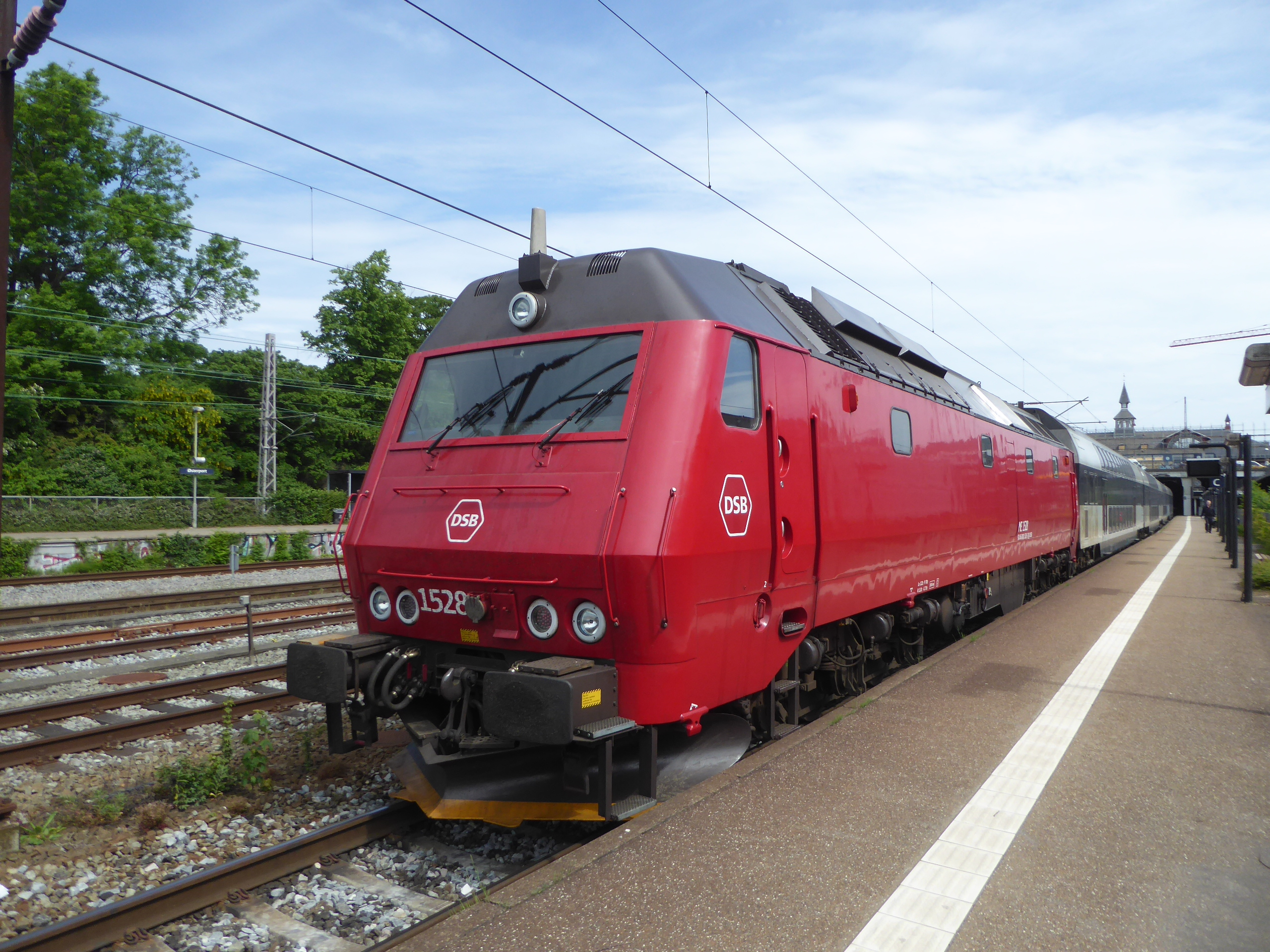
Type and origin
- Power type: Diesel-electric
- Builder: Henschel
- Build date: 1981–1985
- Total produced: 37
Specifications
- Configuration
  - UIC: Co′Co′
- Gauge: 1,435 mm (4 ft 8 1/2 in)
- Wheel diameter: 1,100 mm (43.31 in)
- Length: 21.00 m (68 ft 10 3/4 in)
- Width: 3.15 m (10 ft 4 in)
- Height: 4.35 m (14 ft 3 1/4 in)
- Loco weight: 115.00 t (113.18 long tons; 126.77 short tons)
- Prime mover: EMD 16-645E3B
- Displacement: 10,570 cm^{3} (645 in^{3}) per cylinder
- Cylinders: 16
- Transmission: Electric
- Safety systems: ATC (from 1994)
Performance figures
- Maximum speed: 180 km/h (110 mph) design speed 175 km/h (109 mph) in service
- Power output: 3,300 hp (2,461 kW) @ 900 RPM
- Tractive effort: 360 kN (81,000 lb_{f})
Career
- Operators: DSB; SKPL Cargo
- Number in class: 37
- Numbers: 1501–1537

The DSB class ME are a series of diesel-electric locomotives, introduced in 1981. Henschel built 37 for DSB. They were among the first AC drive locomotives in serial production. As of 2017, 33 units are still in service. The last was withdrawn in December 2021.

== History ==
The locomotives were designed to haul heavier regional services in Sjælland, Denmark, in the early 1980s.

The first unit, 1501 arrived in 1981 after many years of delay. Three years later, in 1983, DSB had received a total of 30 units. Although there had been some serious trouble with the locomotives, DSB found a solution on the problems, and an additional seven units were delivered in 1985.

As of 2017, 33 units were still in service, three had been scrapped and one preserved at the Danish Railway Museum. The ME locomotives was expected to be replaced by IC3 train sets when the IC4 train sets were ready to take over Intercity services. The IC4 train set are very unstable in service and have a variety of problems, however, so they are not going to replace the IC3 train sets in Intercity services. As a result of this DSB have ordered 26 new electric locomotives that are going to replace the ME locomotives by 2020. The units were originally painted in DSB's black/red livery, but in 2006 they were all painted dark blue with red details on the side. In October 2016, DSB began painting the locomotives red to match their new logo.

The exhaust stack is below the air intake of the Bombardier double-decker coaches used in regional services. The air in the coaches was found to have a high concentration of diesel particulate matter, which induces cancer. DSB changed the air filters in 2013, providing a DPM reduction of 40%. But the concentration could still induce cancer for train staff, because they spend a long time in the coaches.

The last was withdrawn on 11 December 2021. Four were sold to Nordic Re-Finance as the TME class.

Polish SKPL Cargo has six locomotives, which have been given the designation SU175.

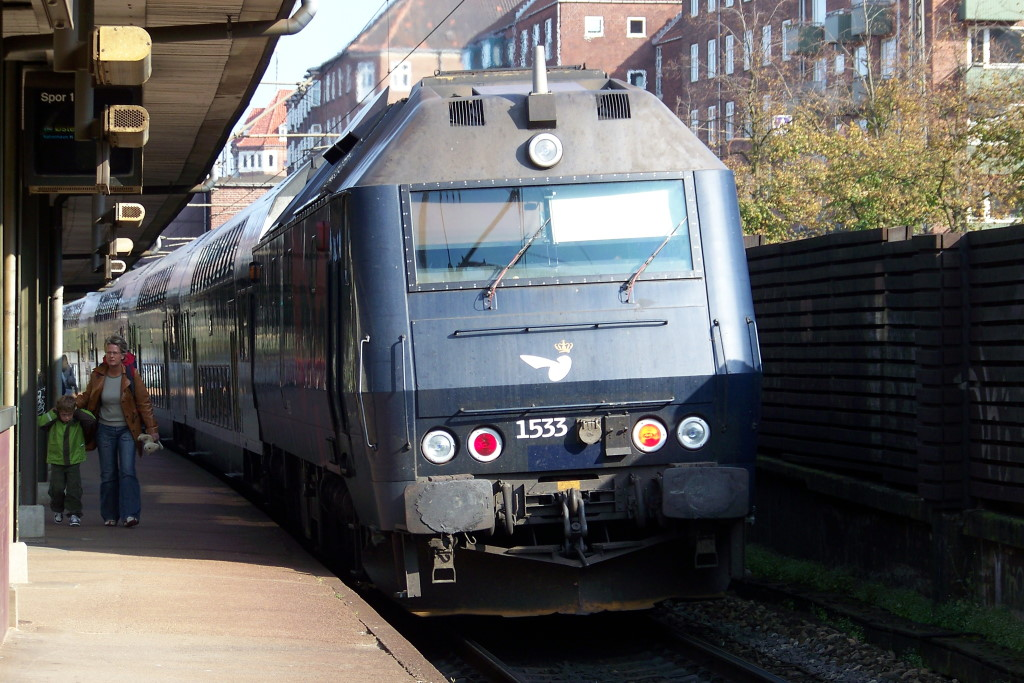
ME unit 1533 in the old livery pushing a set of doubledecker coaches out of Valby station
