= Lindholm railway station =

Railway station in North Jutland, Denmark

Lindholm
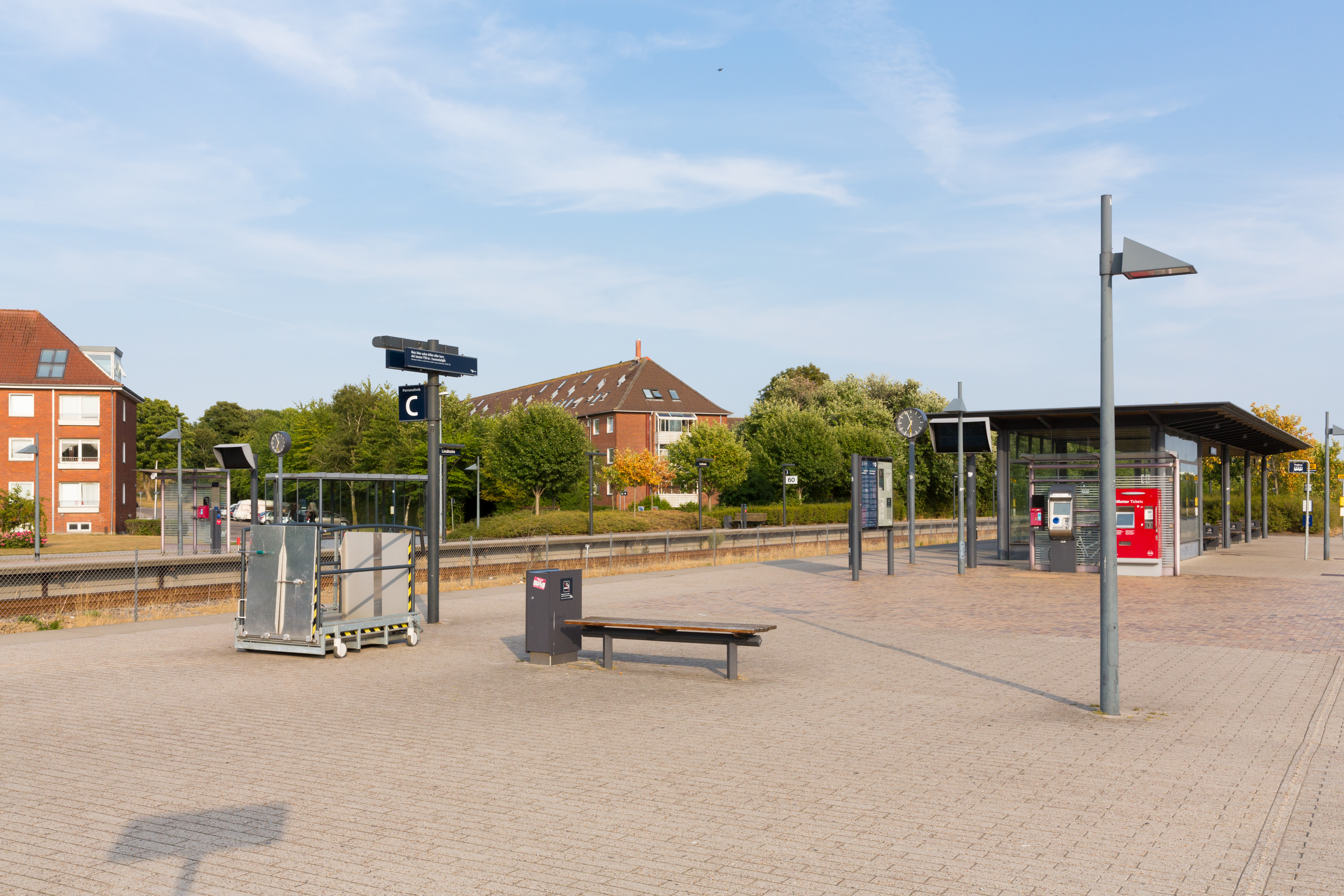
- Lindholm station in 2018

General information
- Location: Lindholm Nærbanevej 1; 9400 Nørresundby; Aalborg Municipality; Denmark
- Coordinates: 57°4′0″N 9°54′19″E
- Elevation: 3.0 metres (9.8 ft)
- Owner: DSB (station infrastructure); Banedanmark (rail infrastructure)
- Lines: Vendsyssel Line; Aalborg Airport railway line (since 2020)
- Platforms: 2 side platforms
- Tracks: 2
- Train operators: DSB; Nordjyske Jernbaner

Other information
- Website: Official website

History
- Opened: 14 December 2002

Services
| Preceding station | DSB | Following station |
|---|---|---|
| Aalborg Vestby towards Copenhagen Airport | Copenhagen-Aalborg InterCityLyn | Aalborg Airport Terminus |
| Aalborg Vestby towards Copenhagen Central | Copenhagen-Aalborg InterCity | Aalborg Airport Terminus |
| Preceding station | Nordjyske Jernbaner | Following station |
| Aalborg Vestby towards Hobro | Hobro – Skagen Regional train | Brønderslev towards Skagen |
| Aalborg Vestby towards Skørping | Skørping – Hirtshals Regional train Peak hours | Brønderslev towards Hirtshals |
Location

Lindholm railway station is a railway station serving the district of Lindholm in the city of Nørresundby in Vendsyssel, Denmark.

The station is located on the Vendsyssel railway line from Aalborg to Frederikshavn and is part of the Aalborg Commuter Rail service. North of Lindholm station the Aalborg Airport railway line branches west to Aalborg Airport. The station opened in 2002. The train services are operated by the railway companies DSB and Nordjyske Jernbaner.

== History ==
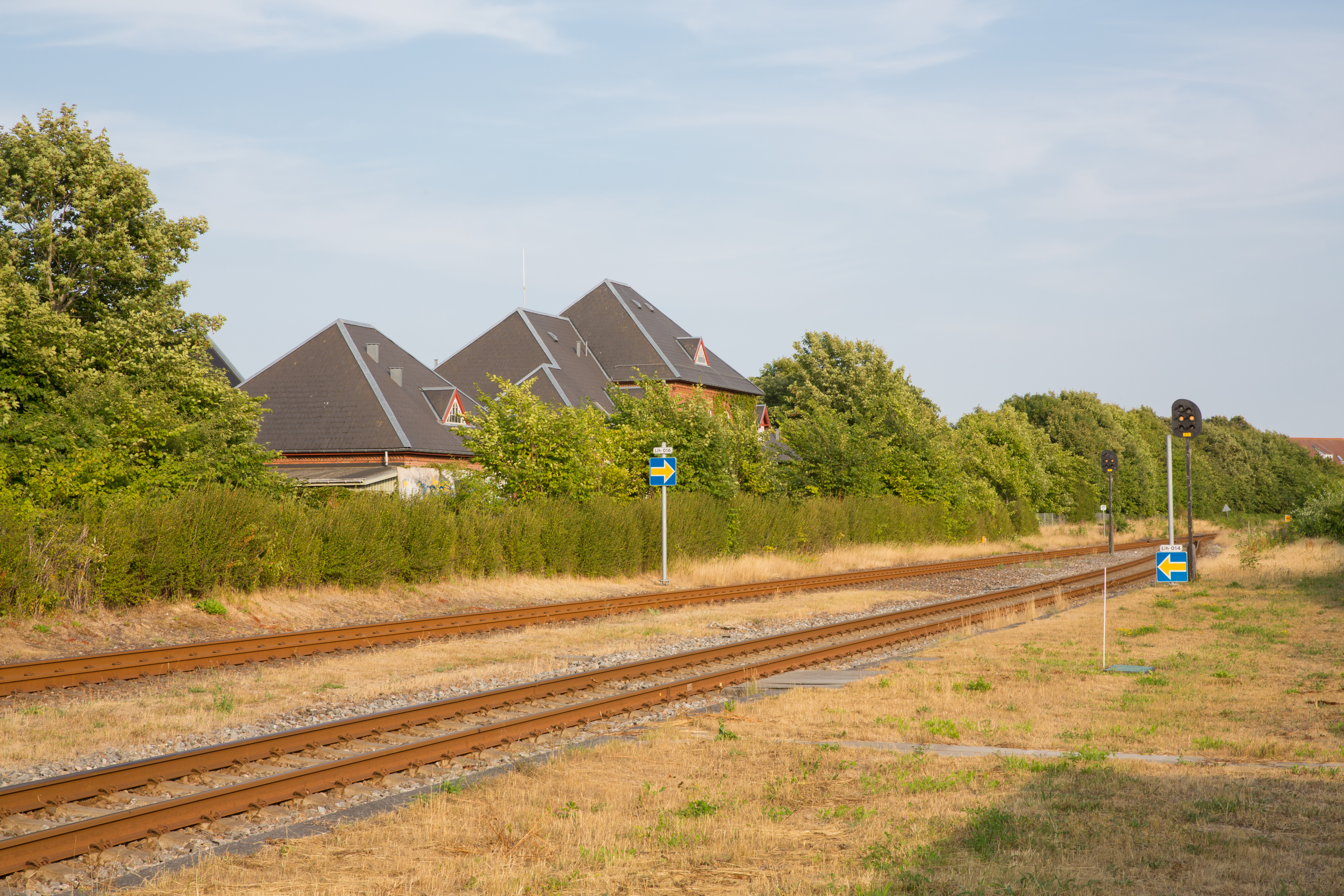
Tracks at Lindholm station with the station building of the old Nørresundby railway station in the background

Lindholm station opened in 2002 as a part of the new Aalborg Commuter Rail service. The station is located about 300 metres (980 ft) north of the old Nørresundby railway station which was closed in 1972. For a year 2012–2013, there was no train service, only bus service, since the Limfjord Railway Bridge across the Limfjord between Nørresundby and Aalborg was damaged and unusable for trains due to a ship collision. In 2020 the Aalborg Airport railway line opened which branches west north of Lindholm station to Aalborg Airport and links Aalborg with its airport.

== Operations ==
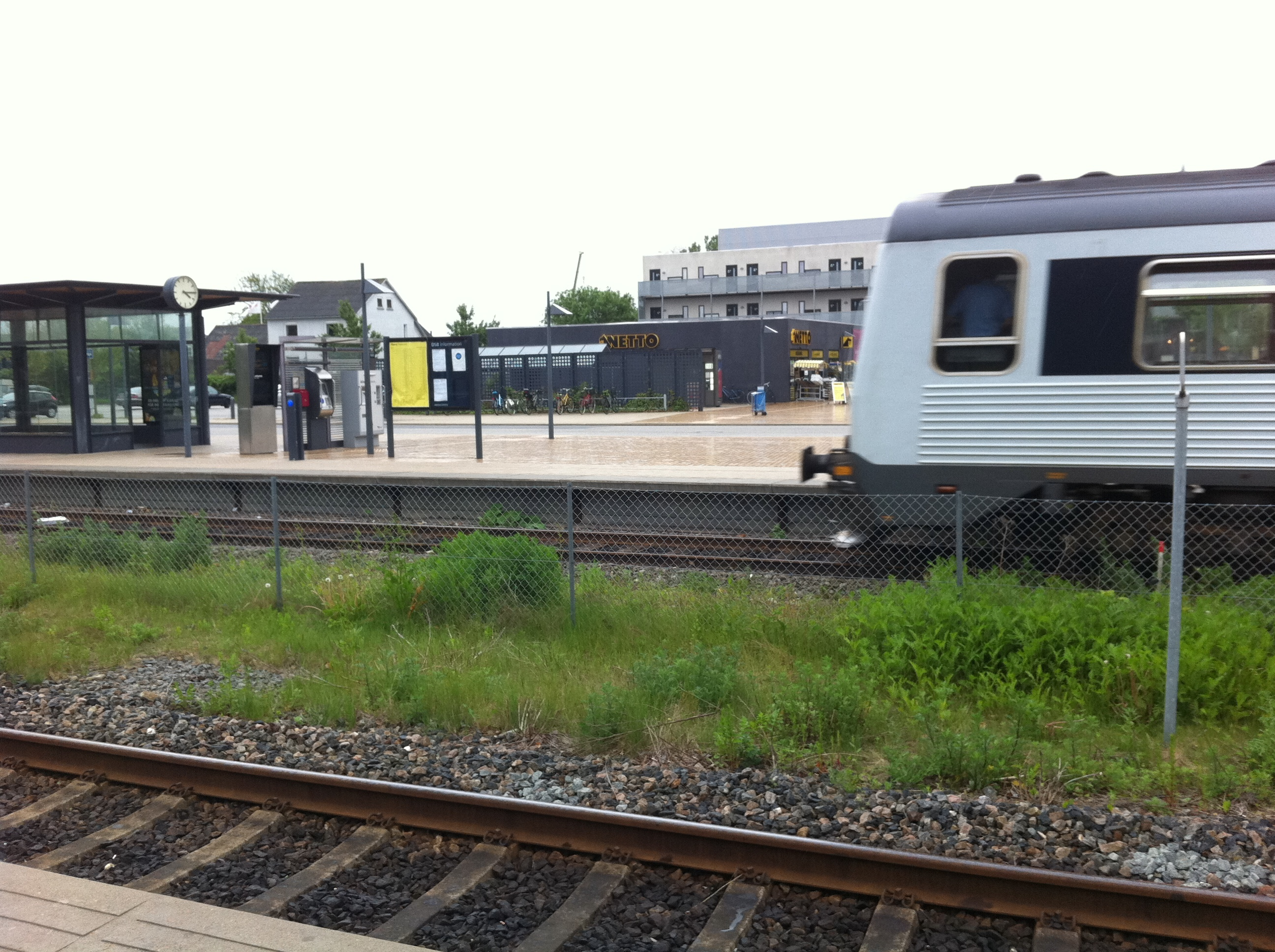
Train at Lindholm station in 2011

The train services at the station are operated by the national railway company DSB which offers direct InterCityLyn and InterCity connections to Copenhagen and Aalborg Airport (using the Aalborg Airport railway line to Aalborg Airport station), and the regional railway company Nordjyske Jernbaner which offers direct regional train services to Aalborg, Skørping, Hobro, Hjørring, Hirtshals and Frederikshavn.

== See also ==
- List of railway stations in Denmark
- Rail transport in Denmark
- History of rail transport in Denmark
