= Aalborg Vestby railway station =

Railway station in Aalborg, Denmark

Aalborg Vestby
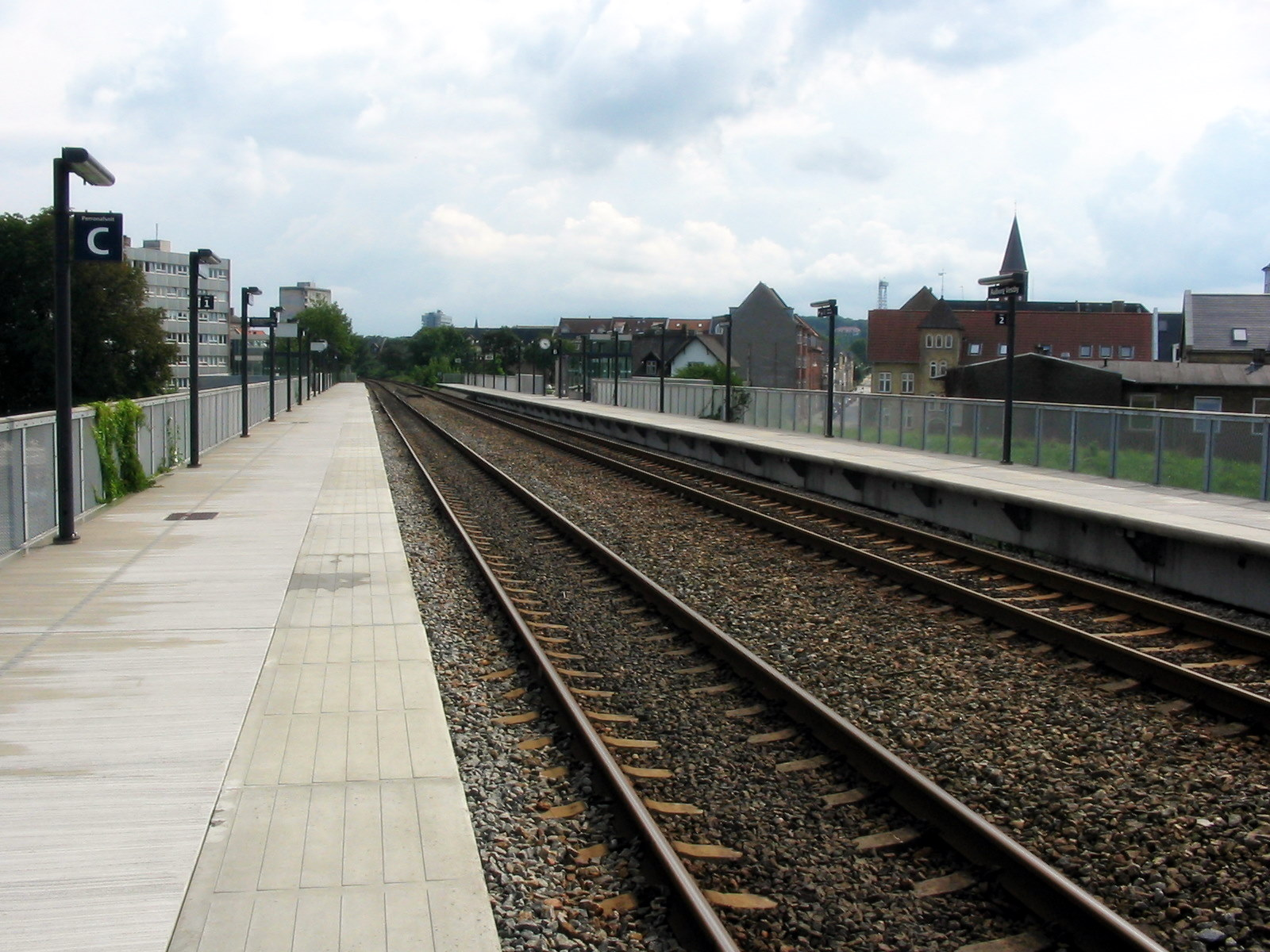
- Aalborg Vestby station in 2006

General information
- Location: Kastetvej/Strandvejen; 9000 Aalborg; Aalborg Municipality; Denmark
- Coordinates: 57°3′12″N 9°54′30″E
- Elevation: 4.6 metres (15 ft)
- Owner: Banedanmark
- Line: Vendsyssel Line
- Platforms: 2 side platforms
- Tracks: 2
- Train operators: DSB; Nordjyske Jernbaner

History
- Opened: 2003

Services
Preceding station	DSB	Following station
Aalborg towards Copenhagen Airport	Copenhagen-Aalborg InterCityLyn	Lindholm towards Aalborg Airport
Aalborg towards Copenhagen Central	Copenhagen-Aalborg InterCity	Lindholm towards Aalborg Airport
Preceding station	Nordjyske Jernbaner	Following station
Aalborg towards Hobro	Hobro – Skagen Regional train	Lindholm towards Skagen
Aalborg towards Skørping	Skørping – Hirtshals Regional train Peak hours	Lindholm towards Hirtshals
Location

Aalborg Vestby railway station is a railway station serving the district of Vestbyen in the city of Aalborg, Denmark.

The station is located on the Vendsyssel Line from Aalborg to Frederikshavn. It opened in 2003 as part of the new Aalborg Commuter Rail service. The train services are operated by the railway companies DSB and Nordjyske Jernbaner.

== History ==
The station opened in 2003 as a part of the new Aalborg Commuter Rail service.

== Operations ==
The train services are operated by the national railway company DSB and the regional railway company Nordjyske Jernbaner. The station offers direct InterCityLyn services to Copenhagen and Aalborg Airport operated by DSB as well as regional train services to Hobro, Skagen and Hirtshals operated by Nordjyske Jernbaner.

== See also ==
- List of railway stations in Denmark
- Rail transport in Denmark
- Transport in Denmark
