= Nørresundby railway station =

Former railway station in Nørresundby, Denmark

Coordinates: 57.0647°N 9.9086°E

Nørresundby Station Nørresundby Banegård
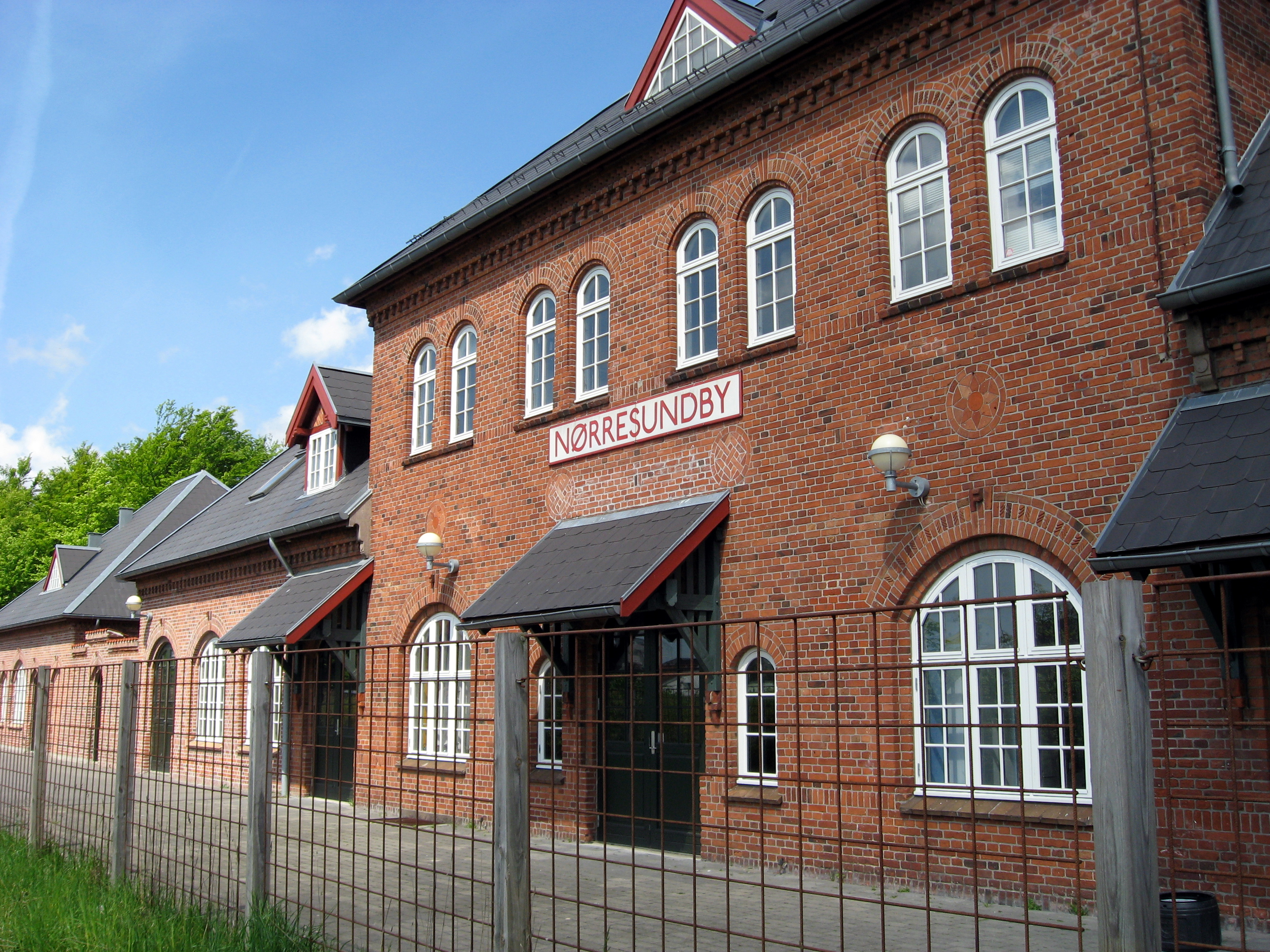
- Nørresundby station in 2010

General information
- Location: Denmark
- System: railway junction
- Lines: Vendsyssel Line; Fjerritslev–Frederikshavn

Construction
- Architect: Heinrich Wenck (1907)

History
- Opened: 1871
- Closed: 1972
Location
- Location within Denmark Location within Europe

Nørresundby railway station is a former railway station serving the town of Nørresundby in North Jutland, Denmark. It was located on the Vendsyssel Line between Aalborg and Frederikshavn via Hjørring, and until 1968 on the Fjerritslev–Frederikshavn railway line.

The station's still existing station building from 1907 was built to designs by the Danish architect Heinrich Wenck.

== History ==
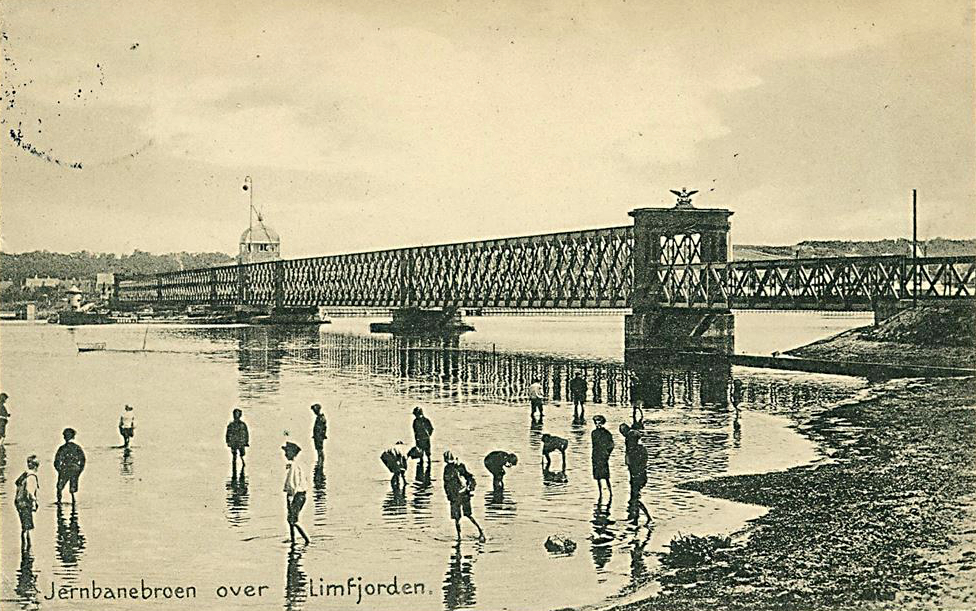
The first railway bridge spanning the Limfjord from 1879.

The station opened in 1871 as the section from Nørresundby to Frederikshavn of the new Vendsyssel Line opened on 16 August 1871. Passengers crossing the Limfjord, a shallow sound separating the North Jutlandic Island from the rest of the Jutland Peninsula, between Nørresundby station and Aalborg station had two opportunities: a ferry or crossing the pontoon bridge located further east on foot. On 7 January 1879, at the opening of the Limfjord Railway Bridge, Nørresundby station was connected with Aalborg station, the Randers-Aalborg railway line and the rest of the Danish rail network.

In 1972, several stations on the Vendsyssel Line (including Nørresundby, Sulsted and Tylstrup) were closed. In 2003, however, a new station called Lindholm (about 300 metres (980 ft) north of the old station) was opened as part of the Aalborg Commuter Rail service.

== Architecture ==
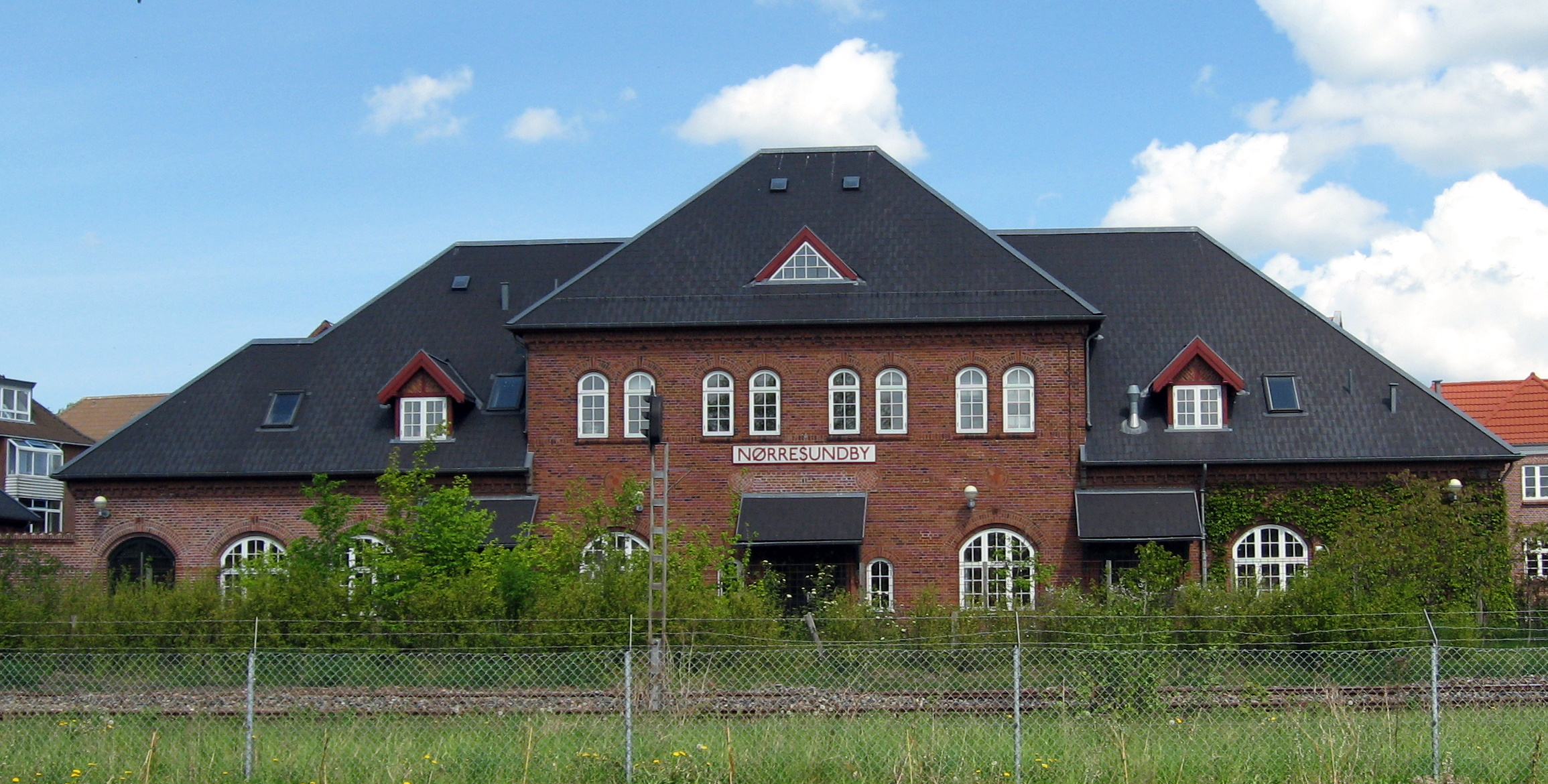
Nørresundby railway station

Nørresundby station's still-existing station building was built in 1907 to designs by the Danish architect Heinrich Wenck (1851–1936), known for the numerous railway stations he designed across Denmark in his capacity of head architect of the Danish State Railways.

== See also ==
- List of railway stations in Denmark
- Rail transport in Denmark
- History of rail transport in Denmark
