= Vendsyssel Line =

Railway line in North Jutland, Denmark

Coordinates: 57.4325°N 9.9702°E

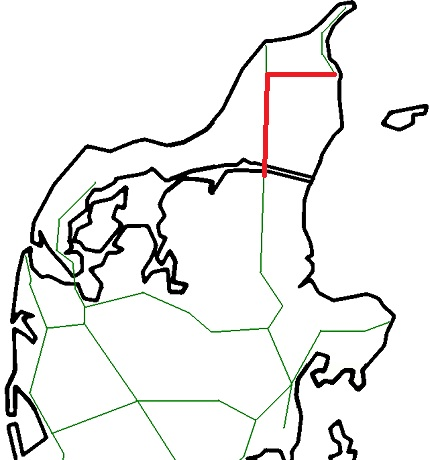

Overview
- Other name: Aalborg–Frederikshavn railway line
- Native name: Vendsysselbanen
- Owner: Banedanmark
- Termini: Aalborg; Frederikshavn
- Stations: 10
- Website: https://bane.dk

Service
- Type: Railway
- System: Danish railway
- Operator(s): Danish State Railways; Nordjyske Jernbaner

History
- Opened: 15 August 1871

Technical
- Line length: 80.7 kilometres (50.1 mi)
- Number of tracks: Single
- Character: Passenger trains Freight trains
- Track gauge: 1,435 mm (4 ft 8 1/2 in)
- Operating speed: 120 km/h
Route map
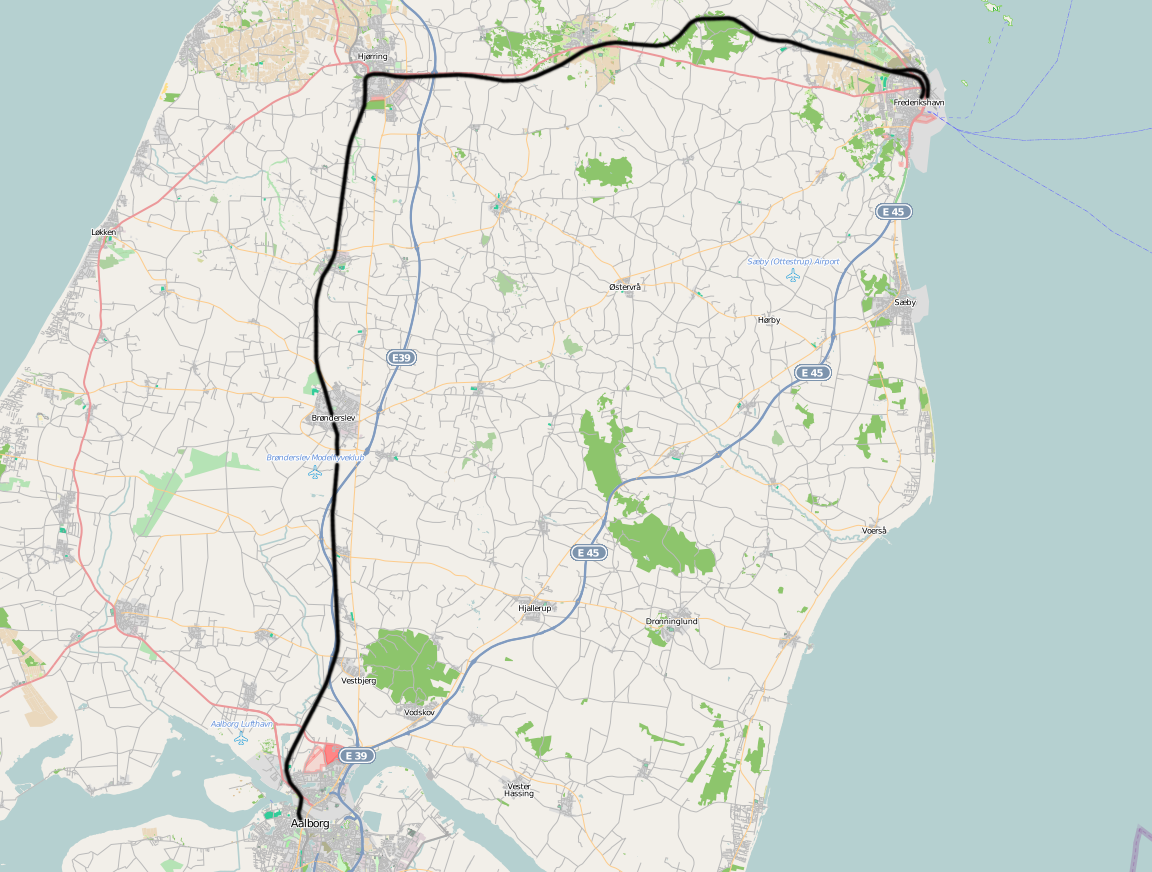
Map of the Vendsyssel Line between Aalborg and Frederikshavn

The Vendsyssel railway line (Danish: Vendsysselbanen) is an 80.7 km (50.1 mi) long standard gauge single track railway line in Denmark which runs through the historical region of Vendsyssel between Aalborg and Frederikshavn in North Jutland. It constitutes the northernmost part of the East Jutland longitudinal railway line (Danish: Den Østjyske Længdebane), the through route along the east coast of the Jutland Peninsula from the German border at Padborg to Frederikshavn.

The section from Nørresundby to Frederikshavn opened in 1871. In 1879 the route was continued from Nørresundby to Aalborg across the Limfjord as the Limfjord Railway Bridge was inaugurated, thus connecting the Vendsyssel railway line with the Randers–Aalborg railway line as well as the rest of the Danish railway network.

The Vendsyssel railway line runs north from Aalborg to Hjørring and turns east from there to Frederikshavn, making the rail distance about 80 km, where the road distance is about 60 km (37 mi). The line is owned and maintained by the railway infrastructure manager Rail Net Denmark and served with passenger trains by the national railway company Danish State Railways (DSB) and local and freight trains by the regional railway company Nordjyske Jernbaner. The southernmost section from Aalborg to Lindholm is also served by the commuter rail service Aalborg Commuter Rail.

The line has three remaining branch lines: from Nørresundby the Aalborg Airport railway line branches west to Aalborg Airport, from Hjørring the Hirtshals railway line branches north to the town and ferry port of Hirtshals, and from Frederikshavn the Skagen railway line branches north to the town and fishing port of Skagen.

== History ==
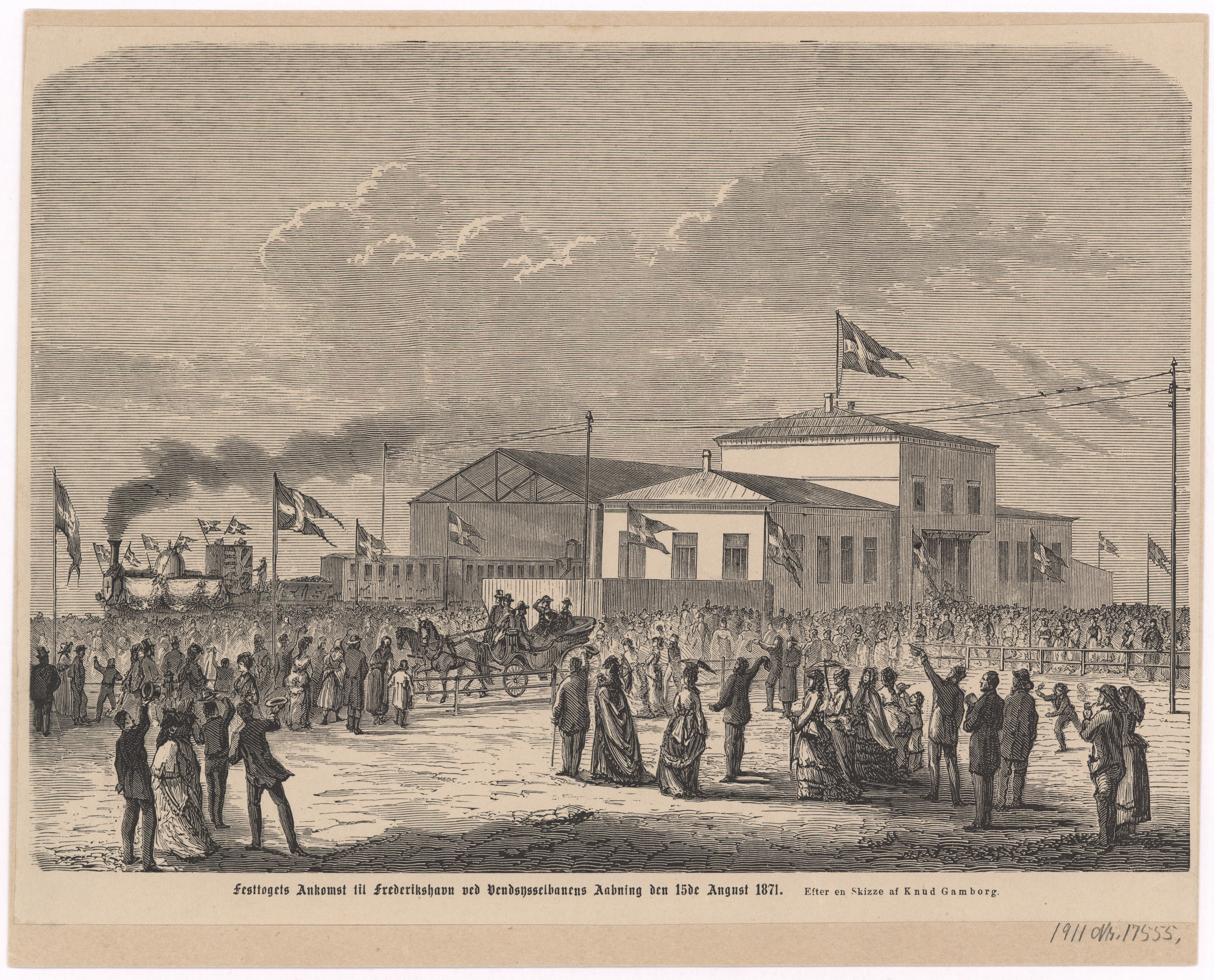
The opening train arrives to Frederikshavn at the opening of the Vendsyssel Line on 15 August.

Work on the section from Nørresundby to Frederikshavn started in May 1869. It was opened on 16 August 1871 in the presence of King Christian IX. Passengers crossing the Limfjord, a shallow sound separating the North Jutlandic Island from the rest of the Jutland Peninsula, between Nørresundby station and Aalborg station had two opportunities: a ferry or crossing the pontoon bridge located further east on foot.

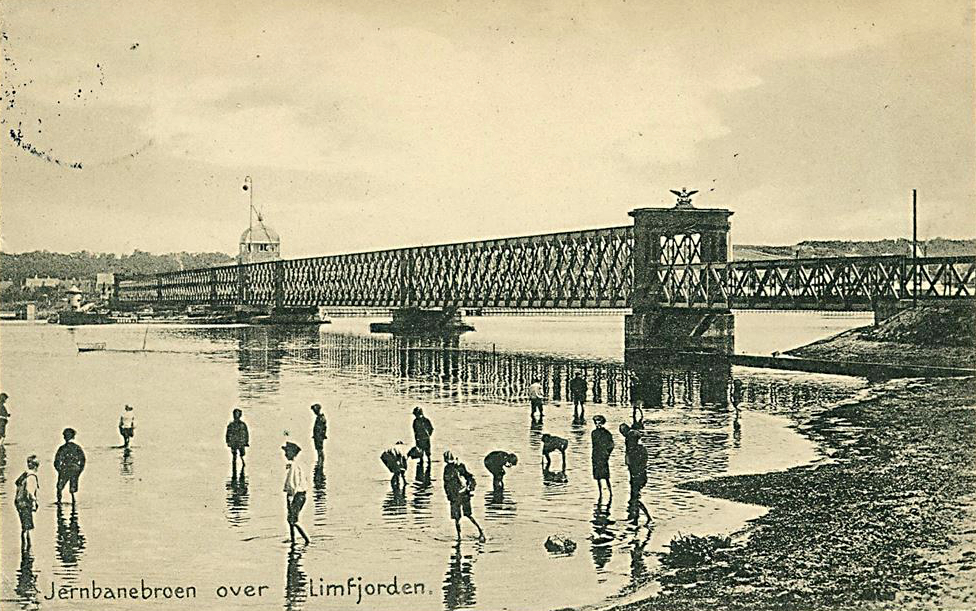
The first railway bridge spanning the Limfjord from 1879.

On 7 January 1879 the route was continued from Nørresundby to Aalborg as the Limfjord Railway Bridge spanning the Limfjord was inaugurated, and the Vendsyssel railway line was connected with the Randers–Aalborg railway line as well as the rest of the Danish railway network. In 1938, the original railway bridge was replaced by the current Limfjord Railway Bridge which was inaugurated on 23 April 1938.

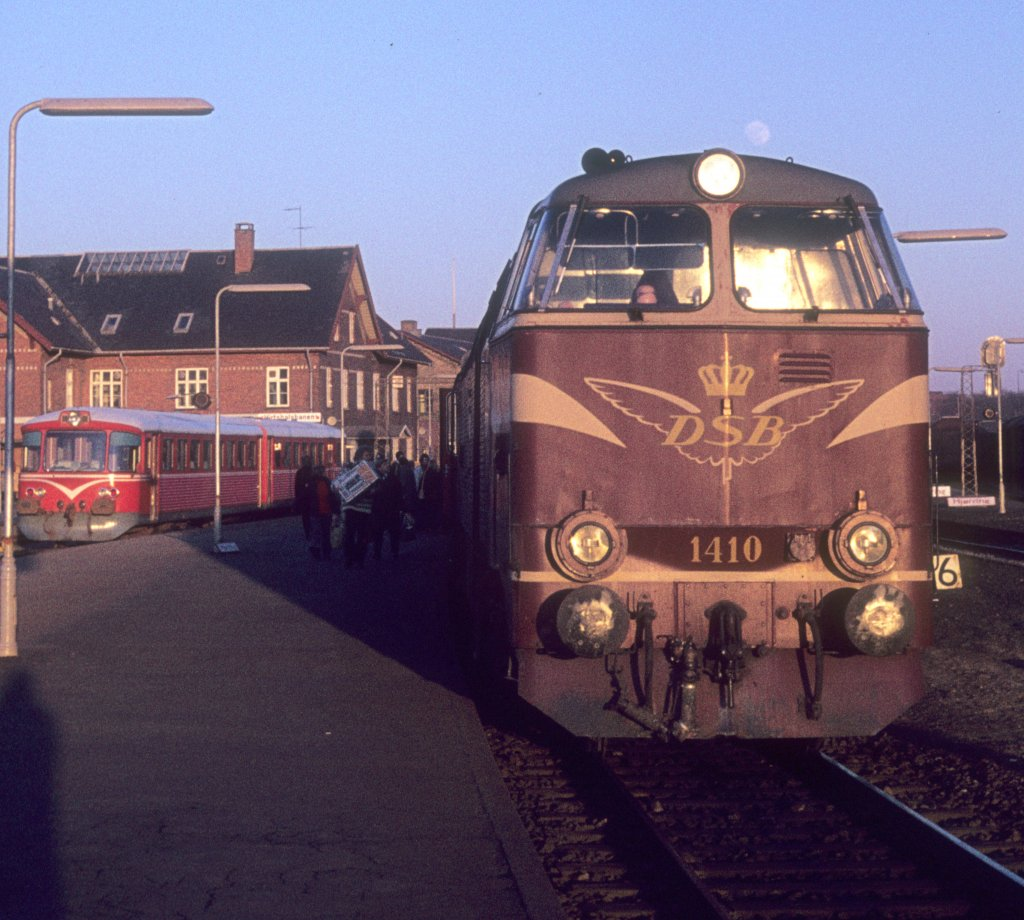
DSB train on the Vendsyssel Line calling at Hjørring in 1975. To the left a local train ready to depart for Hirtshals.

In 1972, several stations (including Nørresundby, Sulsted and Tylstrup) were closed. In 2003, however, two new stations Aalborg Vestby (in Aalborg, south of the Limfjord) and Lindholm (in Nørresundby, about 300 metres (980 ft) north of the old station) were opened as part of Aalborg Commuter Rail. In 2021, a new station Hjørring East was opened in the eastern part of Hjørring.

On 28 March 2012 the Limfjord railway bridge was hit by a ship and severely damaged so it was unusable for trains. For more than a year, there was no train service, only bus service, between Nørresundby and Aalborg until the bridge had been repaired and opened again for traffic on 29 April 2013. In 2017, the regional rail services on the Vendsyssel railway line were transferred from the national railway company DSB to the regional railway company Nordjyske Jernbaner.

== Route ==
The Vendsyssel line runs north from Aalborg, crossing the Limfjord on a 403 metres (1,322 ft) long bascule bridge, the Limfjord Railway Bridge, to Nørresundby. From Nørresundby, the Aalborg Airport railway line branches west to Aalborg Airport. The main line passes west of Lindholm Høje and Hammer hills and continues north to Brønderslev and Hjørring. From Hjørring, the Hirtshals Line branches north to the town and ferry port of Hirtshals. The main line continues east, passing through Tolne hills to its terminus at Frederikshavn, located on the east coast of Vendsyssel. From Frederikshavn, the Skagen Line branches north to the town and fishing port of Skagen.

== Operations ==
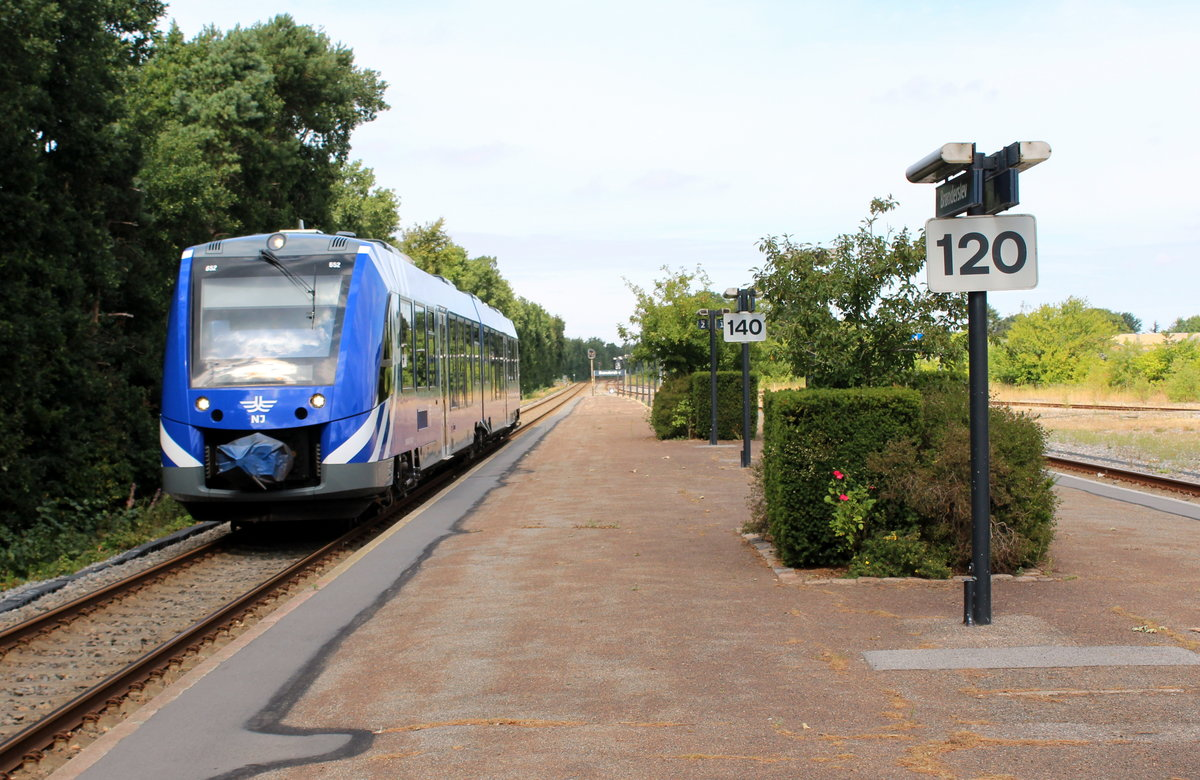
NJ train calling at Brønderslev in 2018.

The line is owned and maintained by the railway infrastructure manager Rail Net Denmark, a government agency under the Danish Ministry of Transport. It is served with InterCity and regional trains by the national railway company Danish State Railways (DSB) and local and freight trains by the regional railway company Nordjyske Jernbaner (NJ). Since 2003, the commuter rail service Aalborg Commuter Rail, operated by DSB, has also served the southernmost section from Aalborg to Lindholm.

== Stations ==
Station	Distance from Aalborg (km)	Distance from Frederikshavn (km)	Remarks
Aalborg	0	84.9	
Aalborg Vestby	1.2	83.7	
Lindholm	3.0	81.9	
Brønderslev	26.4	54.1	
Vrå	36.3	48.6	
Hjørring	48.2	36.7	
Sindal	61.8	23.1	
Tolne	69.0	15.9	
Kvissel	75.4	9.5	
Frederikshavn	84.9	0	
