= Arden railway station, Denmark =

Railway station in North Jutland, Denmark

Arden
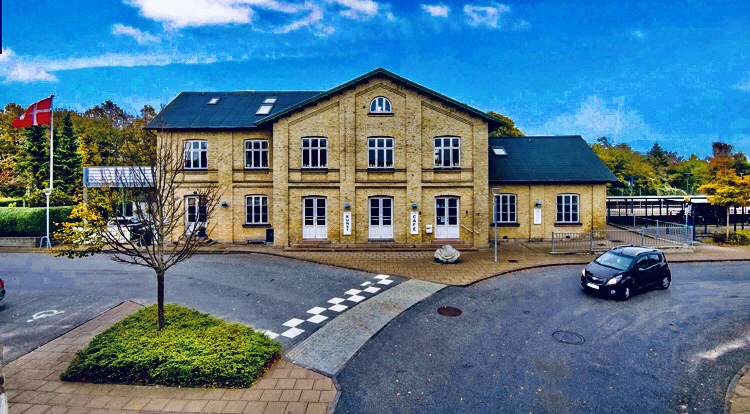
- Arden station in 2021

General information
- Location: Jernbanegade 6; 9510 Arden; Mariagerfjord Municipality; Denmark
- Coordinates: 56°46′11.03″N 9°51′35.9″E
- Elevation: 73.1 metres (240 ft)
- System: railway station
- Owner: DSB (station infrastructure); Banedanmark (rail infrastructure)
- Line: Randers–Aalborg
- Platforms: 2
- Tracks: 2
- Train operators: Nordjyske Jernbaner

Other information
- Website: Official website

History
- Opened: 1869

Services
| Preceding station | Nordjyske Jernbaner | Following station |
|---|---|---|
| Hobro Terminus | Hobro – Skagen Regional train | Skørping towards Skagen |
Location

Arden railway station (previously Store-Arden railway station) is a railway station serving the railway town of Arden in Himmerland, Denmark. The station is located in the centre of the town on the southern edge of the Rold Forest.

Opened in 1869, the station is located on the Randers-Aalborg railway line between Randers and Aalborg. The train services at the station are currently operated by the regional railway company Nordjyske Jernbaner.

== History ==
The station opened in 1869 with the opening of the Randers-Aalborg railway line from Randers to Aalborg. The original villages in the area were Hesselholt a little west of the station, Store Arden a little east of the station and Lille Arden further east. After the opening of the railway line, a railway town quickly developed around the station. The name Arden for the railway town only arose later, and on maps of the town Arden was not used, Store Arden or Hesselholt being used instead.

The station survived a series of station closures in the 1970s.

== Operations ==
The train services are operated by the regional railway company Nordjyske Jernbaner. The station offers direct regional train services to Hobro and Aalborg.

== See also ==
- List of railway stations in Denmark
- Rail transport in Denmark
