= Skørping railway station =

Railway station in North Jutland, Denmark

Skørping
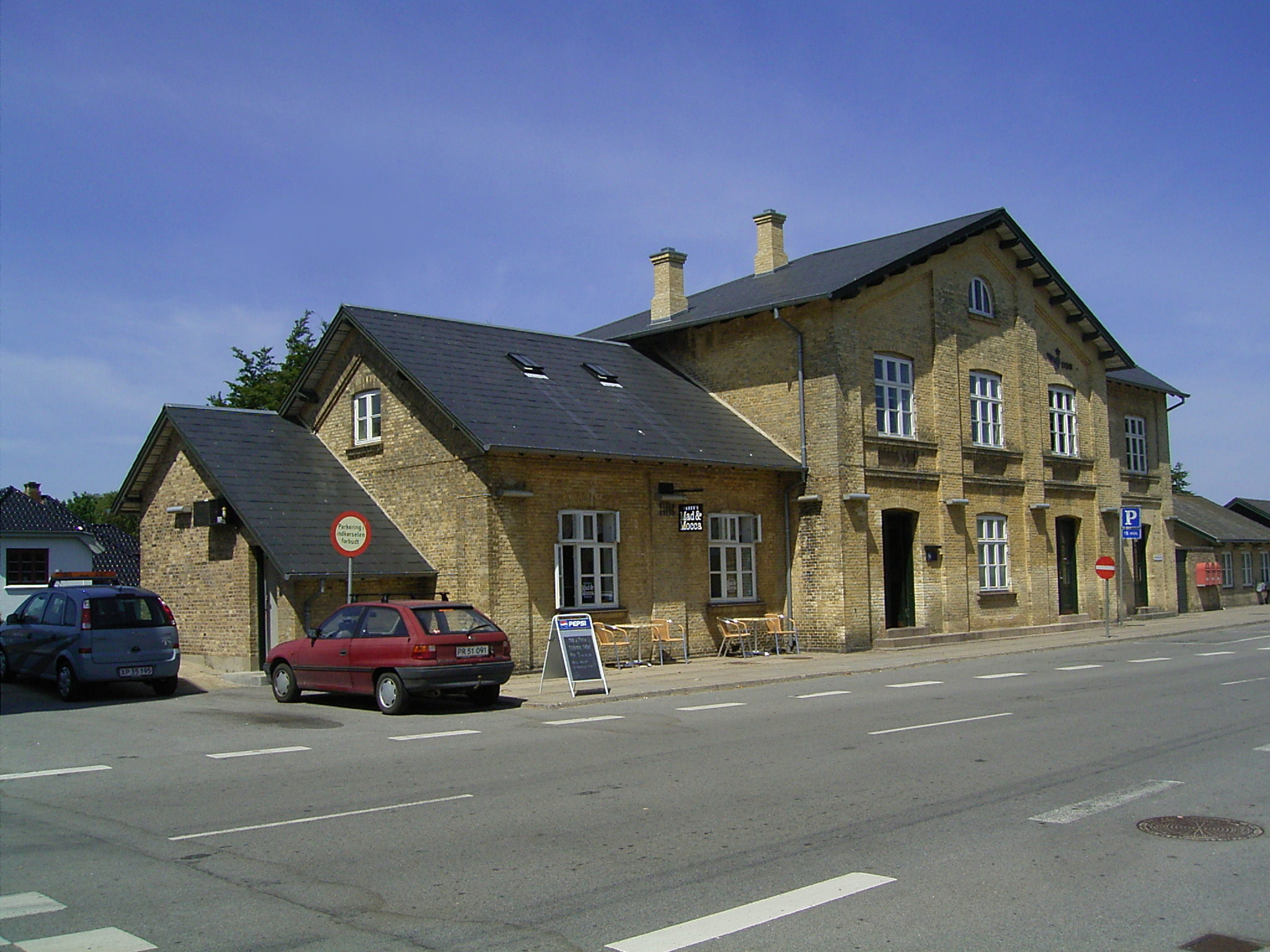
- Front facade of Skørping station

General information
- Location: Sverriggårdsvej 4; 9520 Skørping; Rebild Municipality; Denmark
- Coordinates: 56°50′09″N 9°53′14″E
- Elevation: 55.5 metres (182 ft)
- Owner: DSB (station infrastructure); Banedanmark (rail infrastructure)
- Line: Randers–Aalborg
- Platforms: 2
- Tracks: 3
- Train operators: DSB; Nordjyske Jernbaner

History
- Opened: 18 September 1869; 156 years ago

Services
| Preceding station | DSB | Following station |
|---|---|---|
| Hobro towards Copenhagen Central | Copenhagen-Aalborg InterCity | Aalborg towards Aalborg Airport |
| Preceding station | Nordjyske Jernbaner | Following station |
| Arden towards Hobro | Hobro – Skagen Regional train | Støvring towards Skagen |
| Terminus | Skørping – Hirtshals Regional train Peak hours | Støvring towards Hirtshals |
Location
- Location within Denmark

Skørping station is a railway station serving the railway town of Skørping in the Himmerland peninsula south of Aalborg, Denmark. The station is located in the centre of the town on the northern edge of the Rold Forest.

Opened in 1869, the station is located on the Randers–Aalborg railway line between Randers and Aalborg. The train services are currently operated by the railway companies DSB and Nordjyske Jernbaner.

== History ==
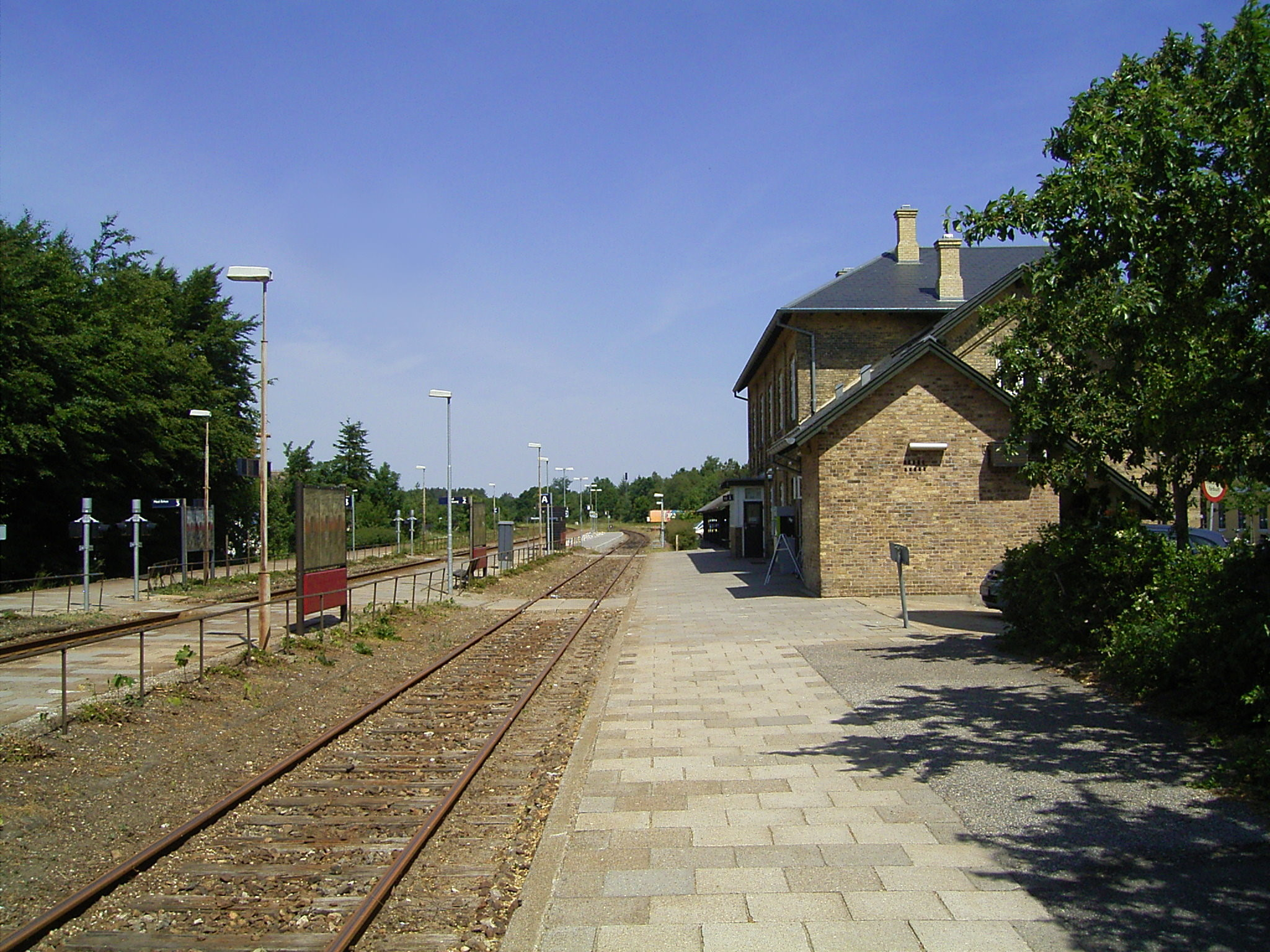
Platforms of Skørping station

The station opened as one of the original intermediate stations of the Randers–Aalborg railway line from Randers to Aalborg which opened on 18 September 1869; 156 years ago.

Skørping station survived a series of station closures in the 1970s. In 2003 ,it became the southern terminus of the new Aalborg Commuter Rail service. In 2017, operation of the commuter rail services between Aalborg and Skørping were transferred from DSB to the regional railway company Nordjyske Jernbaner.

== Operations ==
Skørping station offers direct InterCity services to Copenhagen and Aalborg operated by the national train operating company DSB, and regional train services to Hobro and Aalborg operated by the regional railway company Nordjyske Jernbaner.

== Architecture ==
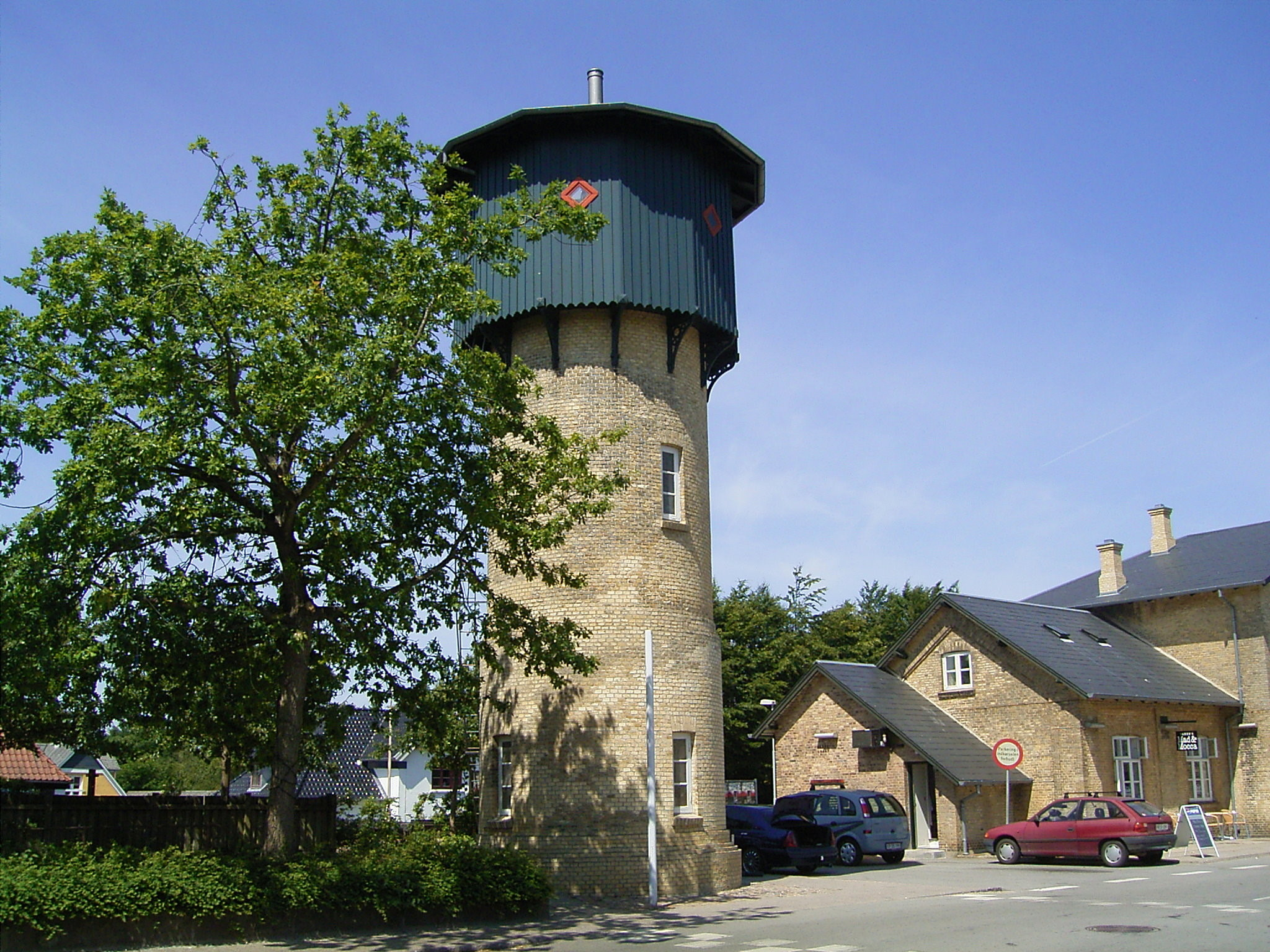
The water tower of Skørping station.

The original station building from 1869 was designed by the Danish railway architect N.P.C. Holsøe (1826–1895), known for the numerous railway stations he designed across Denmark in his capacity of head architect of the Danish State Railways. It was rebuilt in 1878 and 1898.

The station building was listed in the Danish registry of protected buildings and places in 1992 along with the station's water tower.

== In literature ==
Danish writer Herman Bang's novel Ved Vejen was inspired by an incident in 1883 when he was passing through Skørping Station. He noticed a young woman at the window who, her pale face couched in her hands, stared after his departing train. In the introduction to Stille Eksistenser he explains: "For the rest of the journey, I could see the woman's face between the flowers. Her look was not quite one of longing — longing would have perhaps fluttered to death by breaking its wings in such tight confines — just a quite resignation, a waning sorrow. And when the train had slid by, she would be peering out with the same look over Egnens Lyng — over the dreary plain."

Bang started writing the novel in 1885 in Vienna, after remembering Skørping Station: "It was in one of those windows behind the flowers that I saw her face, a face which I had not been able to erase from my memory for two years and which, as if a painter, I felt like drawing in soft, melancholic, almost blurry lines and using it as a kind of cover illustration for this book."

== See also ==
- List of railway stations in Denmark
- Rail transport in Denmark
