= Limfjordsbroen =

Road bridge in Denmark

Coordinates: 57.054722°N 9.920278°E

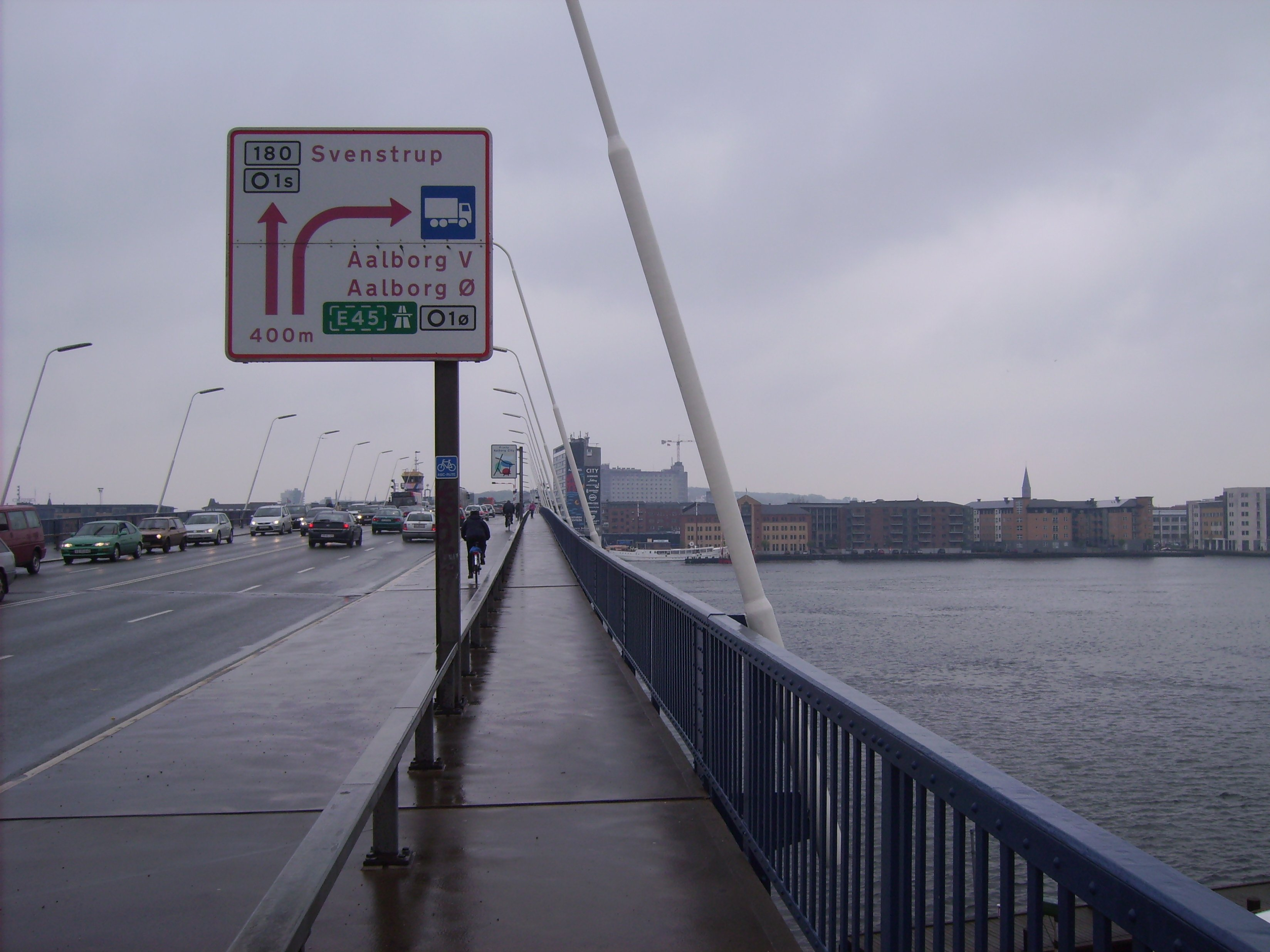
Entering Aalborg from the Limfjordsbroen

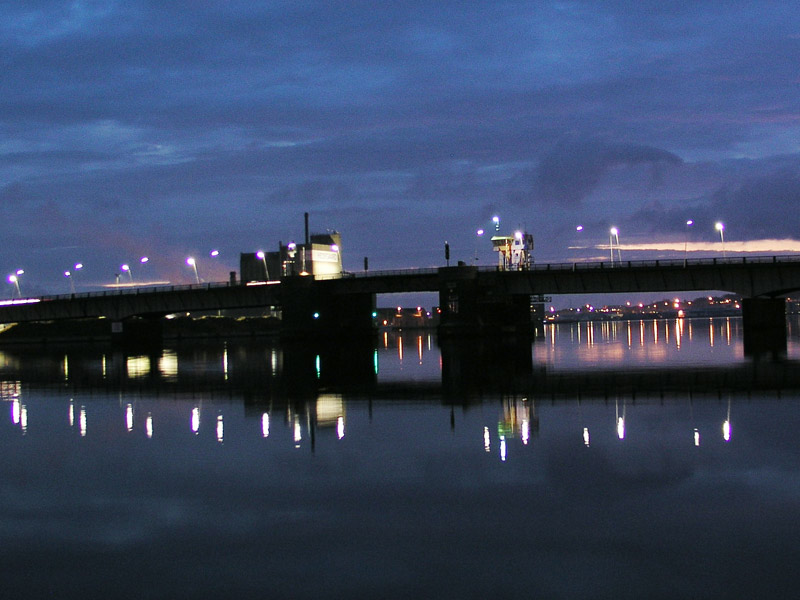
Night view of the Limfjordsbroen

Limfjordsbroen is a Danish bridge which connects Nørresundby and Aalborg over Limfjord, a shallow sound. It was inaugurated 30 March 1933 in the presence of approximately 30,000 spectators and attended by Thorvald Stauning. It was a toll bridge until 1935. The first fixed link between the two cities was established in 1865 in the form of a pontoon bridge, which was in use until the present bridge was established; the original bridge was slow to open and close when ship traffic passed. The bridge was built, without any fatalities, between 1930 and 1933 with 100–200 workers on the construction site. Large sections were built on Aalborg's waterfront west of the bridge's current location. A week before the inauguration, a load test occurred with 48 fully laden trucks placed on the bridge's leaf. A 1960 extension lane increased the bridge's width from 8.5 metres (28 ft) to 12.5 metres (41 ft). A bike path and walking area were added as well. The horizontal clearance measures 98 feet (30 m). Route 180 crosses the bridge.
