= Aalborg railway station =

Main railway station in Aalborg, Denmark

Aalborg
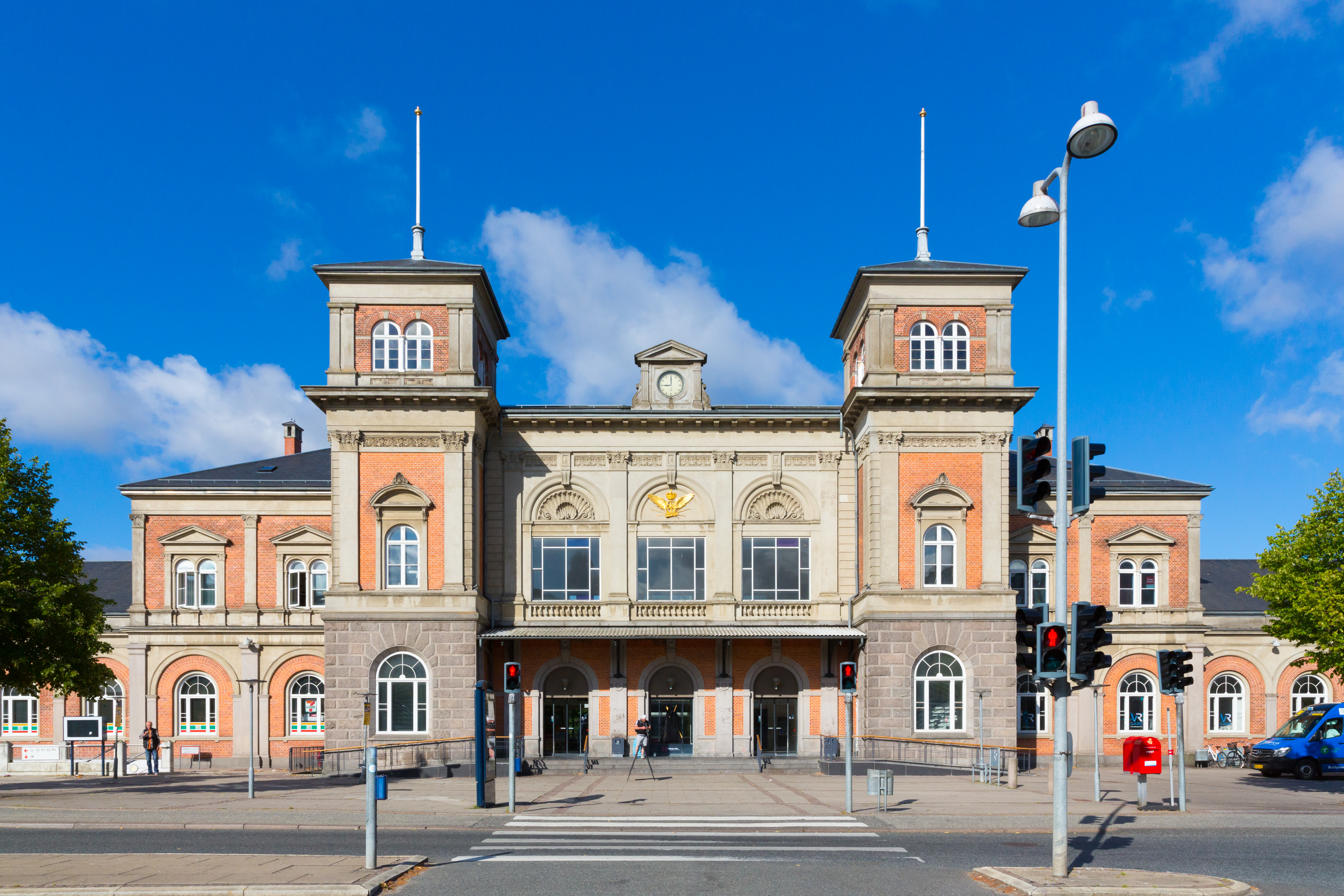
- Front facade of Aalborg station viewed from J. F. Kennedy Square

General information
- Location: John F. Kennedys Plads 3; 9000 Aalborg; Aalborg Municipality; Denmark
- Coordinates: 57°02′35″N 9°55′01″E
- Elevation: 4.4 metres (14 ft)
- Owner: DSB (station infrastructure); Banedanmark (rail infrastructure)
- Lines: Randers–Aalborg; Vendsyssel line
- Platforms: 2
- Tracks: 4
- Train operators: DSB; Nordjyske Jernbaner

Construction
- Architect: Niels Peder Christian Holsøe (1869); Thomas Arboe (1902)

Other information
- Website: Official website

History
- Opened: 1869
- Rebuilt: 1902

Services
Preceding station	DSB	Following station
Hobro towards Copenhagen Airport	Copenhagen-Aalborg InterCityLyn	Aalborg Vestby towards Aalborg Airport
Skørping towards Copenhagen Central	Copenhagen-Aalborg InterCity	Aalborg Vestby towards Aalborg Airport
Preceding station	Nordjyske Jernbaner	Following station
Skalborg towards Hobro	Hobro – Skagen Regional train	Aalborg Vestby towards Skagen
Skalborg towards Skørping	Skørping – Hirtshals Regional train Peak hours	Aalborg Vestby towards Hirtshals
Location

Aalborg railway station (Danish: Aalborg Station or Aalborg Banegård) is the main railway station serving the city of Aalborg, Denmark. It is located in central Aalborg, on the southwestern edge of the city center, with entrances from John F. Kennedys Plads and access to platforms from Kildeparken.

Aalborg railway station is serving as a connecting hub for rail traffic between North Jutland and the rest of Denmark. It offers direct InterCityLyn and InterCity services to Copenhagen operated by DSB, and regional rail services to Hobro, Skagen and Hirtshals operated by Nordjyske Jernbaner. The station is located immediately adjacent to the Aalborg bus station.

== History ==
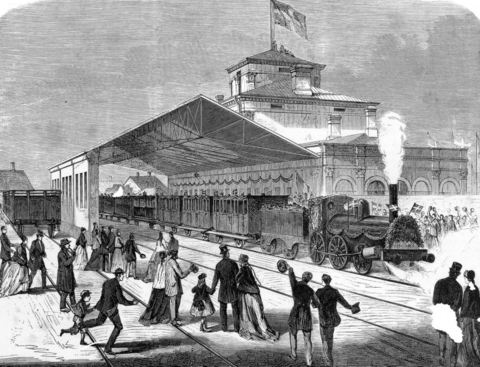
A Xylography from 1869 showing the first train departing from Aalborg Station on 18 September 1869

Aalborg railway station was inaugurated by King Christian IX of Denmark on 18 September 1869, with the opening of the new Randers–Aalborg railway line between Aalborg and Randers. Daily operations began the next day with three trains daily in each direction. In 1879, at the opening of the Limfjord Railway Bridge, Aalborg station was connected with the Vendsyssel Line from Nørresundby to Hjørring and Frederikshavn.

In 1897 the railway line from Nørresundby to Fjerritslev and in 1899 the railway line from Nørresundby via Sæby to Frederikshavn opened. Although both railway lines were located north of the Limfjord, almost all trains departed from Aalborg station. In 1899 the Aalborg-Hvalpsund railway line opened, which ran from Aalborg through the western part of the peninsula of Himmerland via Nibe to Aars (extended to Hvalpsund in 1910). Initially, the railway line's train departed from Svenstrup station, but the trains ran all the way through to and from Aalborg from 8 December 1902, when Aalborg's new railway station was opened. In 1900, the station also became the starting point for the Aalborg-Hadsund railway line, which ran from Aalborg through the eastern part of Himmerland to Hadsund.

The Sæby line was closed in 1968, while the Fjerritslev, Hvalpsund and Hadsund lines were closed in 1969.

In 2003 Aalborg station became one of the stations served by the new Aalborg Commuter Rail service, which serves seven railway stations in the Greater Aalborg area between Nørresundby in the north and Skørping in the south. In 2017, the regional rail services from Aalborg station to Skørping and Frederikshavn were transferred from DSB to the railway company Nordjyske Jernbaner.

== Architecture ==
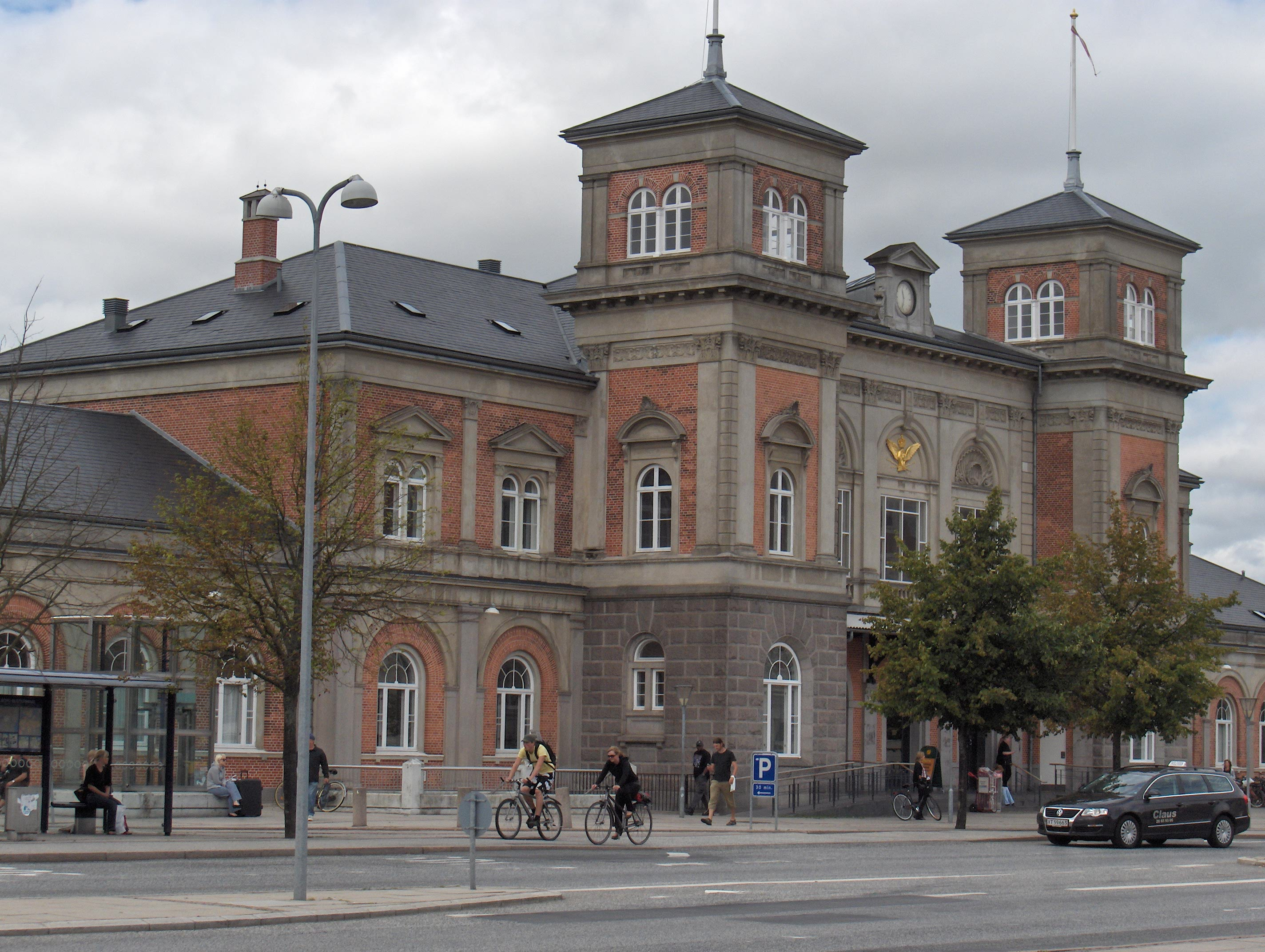
The station building in 2007

The original station building from 1869 was designed by the Danish architect N.P.C. Holsøe. It was built in a mostly Neo-Renaissance style and was located approximately 300 meters north of the current station building.

In 1902 the first station building was torn down and the present station building opened. It was designed by the Danish architect Thomas Arboe. The station building was listed in 1992.

== Facilities ==
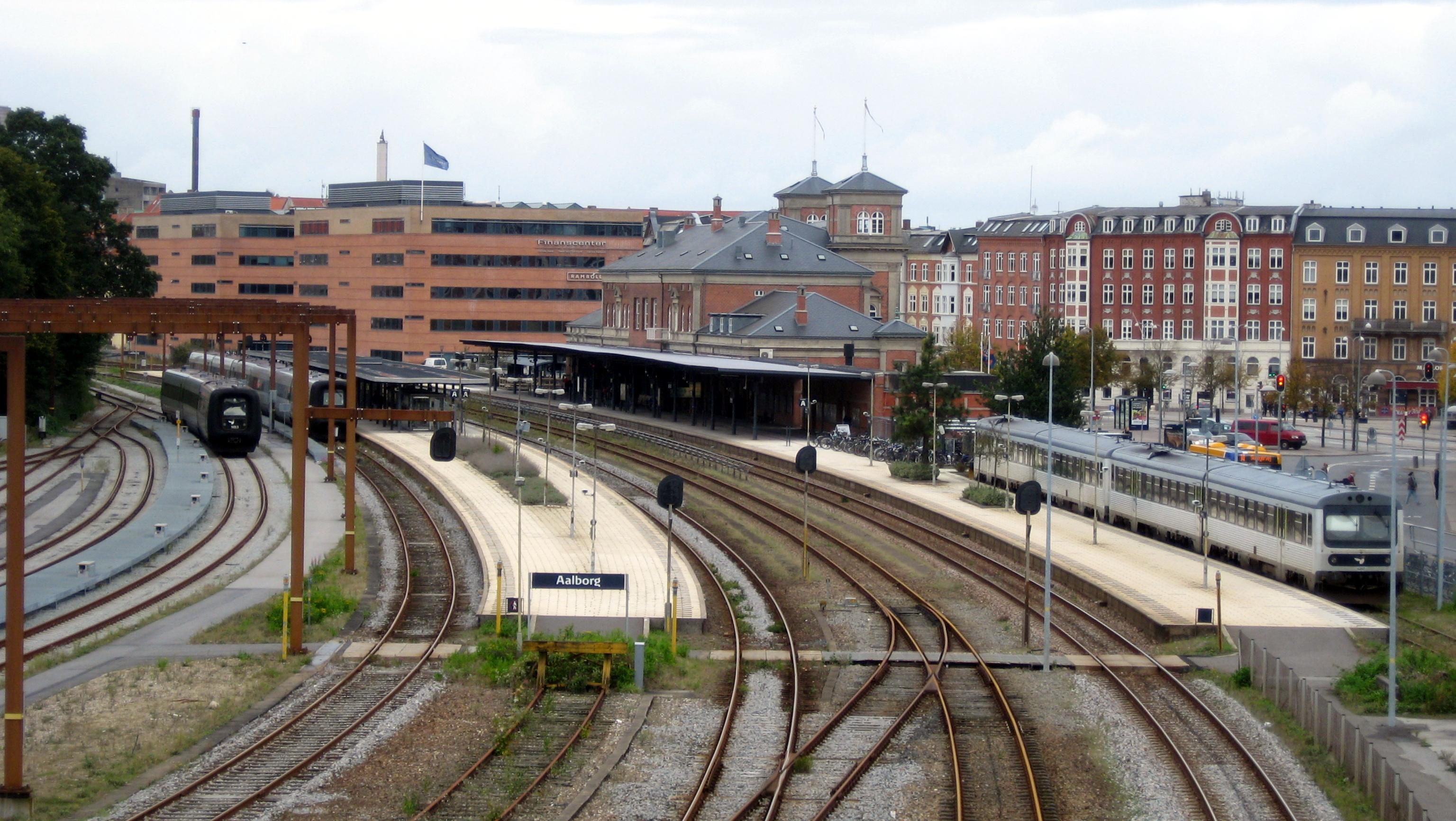
View of the tracks and platforms

The station has a ticket office which sells tickets for both domestic and international travel, a shop which sells food, drinks, newspapers and more. The railway station also includes a pay phone, a waiting room, luggage boxes, a photo booth, toilets and an accessible toilet. There is also an opportunity for both bicycle and car parking near the main entrance to the railway station. It is also possible to rent a car at the station or take a taxi. Aalborg Bus Terminal is also only across the street from the railway station.

== Services ==
Aalborg station is serving as a connecting hub for rail traffic, connecting North Jutland with the rest of Denmark.

It offers direct InterCityLyn and InterCity connections to Copenhagen operated by the national railway company DSB, as well as regional rail services to Hobro, Skørping, Skagen and Hirtshals operated by the regional railway company Nordjyske Jernbaner.

== Cultural references ==
Aalborg station is seen at 0:37:00 and 0:52:19 in the 1977 Olsen-banden film The Olsen Gang Outta Sight.

== See also ==
- List of railway stations in Denmark
- Rail transport in Denmark
- History of rail transport in Denmark
- Transport in Denmark
