= Kildeparken =

Public park in Aalborg, Denmark

Coordinates: 57.041944°N 9.913889°E

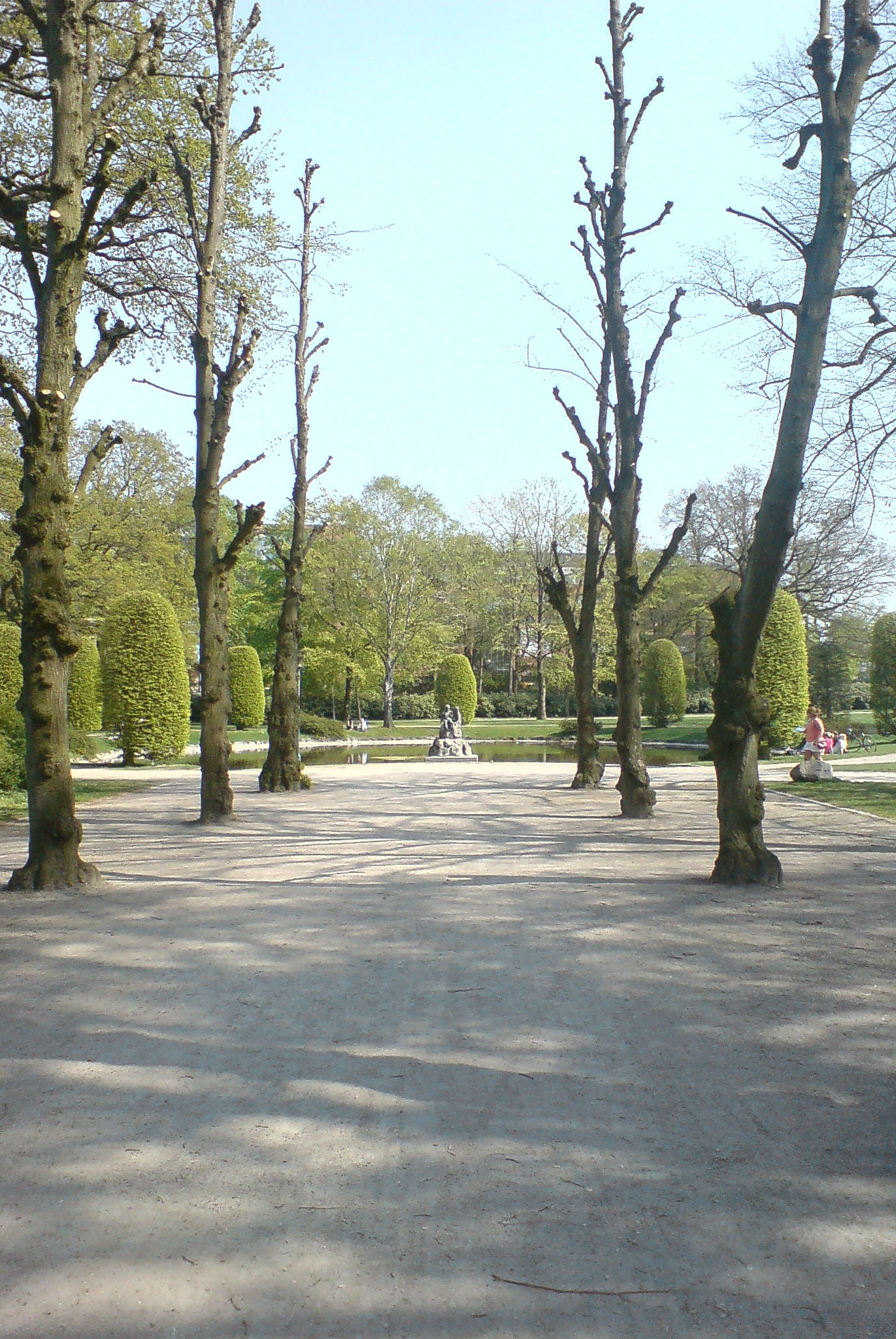
Kildeparken

Kildeparken (locally, "Kilden") is a large public park in Aalborg, Denmark. It is bounded by the streets Europahallen, Vesterbro, Old Kærvej, and the railway. It is possible to reach it from John F. Kennedys Plads through a tunnel. The park features a small lake with a fountain, sculptures, an open-air stage, and ”the Singing Trees” which were planted by notable artists. Said to be the oldest park of Aalborg, the park boasts traditional statues like the Three Graces by Bertel Thorvaldsen (1770–1844) and the Bacchus Child by Anne Marie Carl-Nielsen. The park hosts concerts and is the center of Aalborg Carnival, an annual event.
