= Arden, Denmark =

Arden
- Town
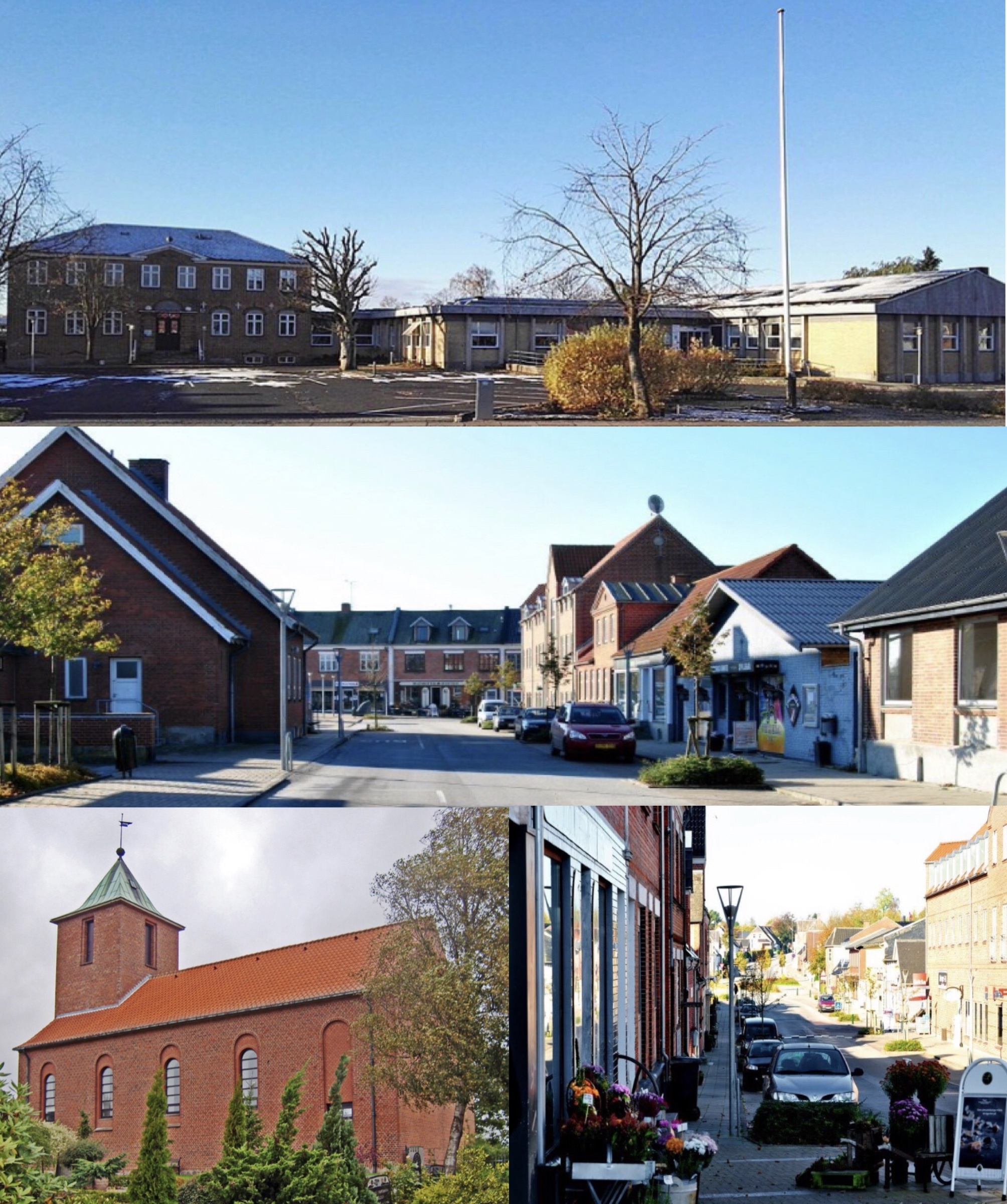

- Location in Denmark Arden (North Jutland Region)
- Coordinates: 56°46′07″N 9°51′26″E
- Country: Denmark
- Region: North Jutland (Nordjylland)
- Municipality: Mariagerfjord

Area
  - Urban: 2 km^{2} (0.77 sq mi)

Population (2026)
  - Urban: 2,595
  - Urban density: 1,300/km^{2} (3,400/sq mi)
- Time zone: UTC+1 (CET)
  - Summer (DST): UTC+2 (CEST)
- Postal code: DK-9510 Arden

Arden is a railway town situated in the Himmerland peninsula south of the city of Aalborg in Jutland, Denmark.

Arden was originally named Hesselholt but changed its name when the East Jutland railroad reached the city in the 1870s. Today the town has a population of 2,595 (2026). The town is situated on the southern outskirt of Denmark's largest forest, Rold Skov (Rold Forest). Arden is served by Arden railway station, located on the Randers–Aalborg railway line.
