= Aalborg Commuter Rail =

Danish commuter rail service

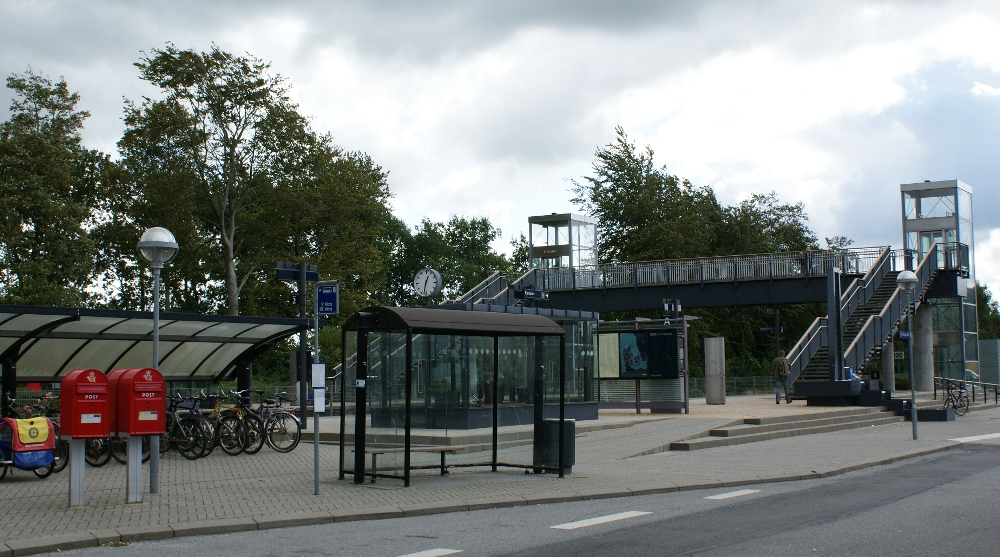

Overview
- Owner: Rail Net Danmark
- Locale: Region Nordjylland, Denmark
- Transit type: Commuter rail
- Number of lines: 1
- Number of stations: 7

Operation
- Began operation: 2003
- Operator: Danish State Railways

Technical
- System length: 29 km
- Track gauge: 1,435 mm (4 ft 8 1/2 in)

Aalborg Commuter Rail (Danish: Aalborg Nærbane) is a commuter rail service in and near Aalborg, Denmark. The service started in 2003 and is operated by the Danish State Railways. There is one line, from Lindholm station in Nørresundby to Skørping, which runs on the mainline Randers-Aalborg Line and Vendsyssel Line.

The stops are: Lindholm, Aalborg Vestby, Aalborg, Skalborg, Svenstrup, Støvring, Skørping. Trains depart twice per hour during daytime, once per hour weekends. Some trains are regional trains which go Frederikshavn-Aarhus. A link to Aalborg Airport was opened in 2020.

Diesel trainsets are used, for example DSB class MR or IC3.

== See also ==
- List of commuter rail systems
