= Listed buildings in Rebild Municipality =

This is a list of listed buildings in Rebild Municipality, Denmark.

== The list ==
Listing name	Image	Location	Coordinates	Description
Albæk		Hjortholmvej 41, 9541 Suldrup	1800	Ref
Buderupholm		Buderupholmvej 44, 9530 Støvring	1731	840-5277-1
Gerding Rectory		Sct Jørgensvej 1, 9520 Skørping	1911	Ref
Lindenborg		Aalborgvej 63, 9260 Gistrup	1583	840-3767-1
Nørlund		Roldvej 144, 9610 Nørager	1590	840-12031-1
Randrup		Randrupvej 9, 9293 Kongerslev	1900	840-1953-1
Skørping station		Sverriggårdsvej 3, 9520 Skørping	1869	
Skørping Water Tower		Sverriggårdsvej 3, 9520 Skørping	1898	Ref
Vorgaard		Svanfolkvej 1, 9574 Bælum	1722	840-3187-1
