= Nørresundby =

- City
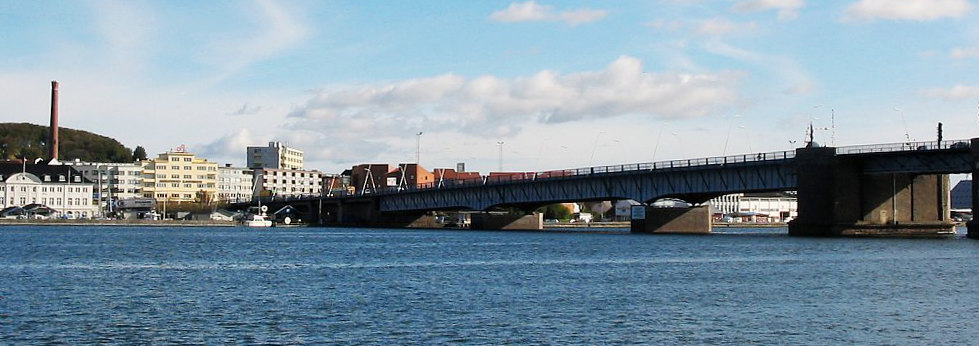
- Limfjordsbroen, the bridge linking Nørresundby with Aalborg over the Limfjord

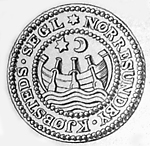
- Seal Coat of arms
- Nicknames: Nørrenutten, Nørrenitten, Solsiden ("The Sunny Side")
- Location within Denmark
- Coordinates: 57°04′N 9°55′E
- Country: Denmark
- Region: North Denmark
- Municipality: Aalborg Municipality

Population (2026)
  - Total: 24,831
- Time zone: UTC+1 (Central Europe Time)
  - Summer (DST): UTC+2
- Postal code: 9400

Nørresundby (Danish pronunciation: [nɶɐ̯ɐˈsɔnˌpyˀ]) is a city in Aalborg Municipality, north of Limfjorden, in Vendsyssel, in Denmark. The urban area has a population of 24,831 (1 January 2026). It is located just north of Aalborg, which lies south of Limfjorden. Since 2006, it has been a statistically independent urban area, but it is often still considered part of Aalborg; sometimes the name Greater Aalborg (Stor-Aalborg) is used to describe the concept.

The city is connected to Aalborg by the Limfjordsbroen road bridge, and an iron railway bridge, as well as a motorway (E45) passing it to the east and running under the Limfjord.

Nørresundby is the site of the Lindholm Høje settlement and burial ground from the Germanic Iron Age and Viking times. There is also a museum on the site.

Nørresundby has many sports clubs, including football club Nørresundby FB.

== History ==
Historical population
Year	Pop.	±%
1787	496	—
1801	606	+22.2%
1834	874	+44.2%
1845	895	+2.4%
1860	1,376	+53.7%
1870	1,609	+16.9%
1880	1,757	+9.2%
1890	1,825	+3.9%
1901	3,544	+94.2%
1911	5,362	+51.3%
1921	9,497	+77.1%
1930	13,789	+45.2%
1940	15,582	+13.0%
1950	17,288	+10.9%
1960	22,625	+30.9%
1970	23,150	+2.3%
1976*	22,339	−3.5%
2006	20,923	−6.3%
2009	20,964	+0.2%
2021	23,718	+13.1%
Source: Historical population from 1787–2009

During the Torstenson War, the city was captured by Swedish forces following a battle in January 1644.

In 1865 a pontoon bridge by the name of Christian IX's pontoon bridge was built. Fourteen years later in 1879 a railroad bridge was built, which, although it was replaced in 1938, still stands today. In 1933, the pontoon bridge was removed and a new bridge, called the Limfjords bridge (Limfjordsbroen), was built in its place. Five years later, on 29 May 1938, Aalborg Airport opened.

Through 1958–1960 the Limfjords bridge was expanded and in 1969 the Limfjords tunnel (Limfjordstunnelen) east of Nørresundby was opened. As a supplement to these bridges and the railway bridge, adding a fourth connection over the Limfjord has been spoken about for several years, although no direct action has been taken.

== Transportation ==
=== Airport ===
Aalborg Airport is located west of Nørresundby. North Flying has its head office in the North Flying Terminal at Aalborg Airport in Nørresundby.

=== Rail ===
Nørresundby is served by Lindholm railway station, located in the district of Lindholm in the western part of the city. Lindholm station is located on the Vendsyssel railway line between Aalborg and Frederikshavn. North of the station the Aalborg Airport railway line branches west to Aalborg Airport. The station offers direct InterCity services to Copenhagen, regional train services to Aalborg and Frederikshavn, and commuter rail services to Aalborg Airport and Skørping as part of the Aalborg Commuter Rail service.

=== Road ===
The city is connected to Aalborg by a road bridge Limfjordsbroen, as well as a motorway (E45) passing it to the east and running under the Limfjord.

== Notable people ==
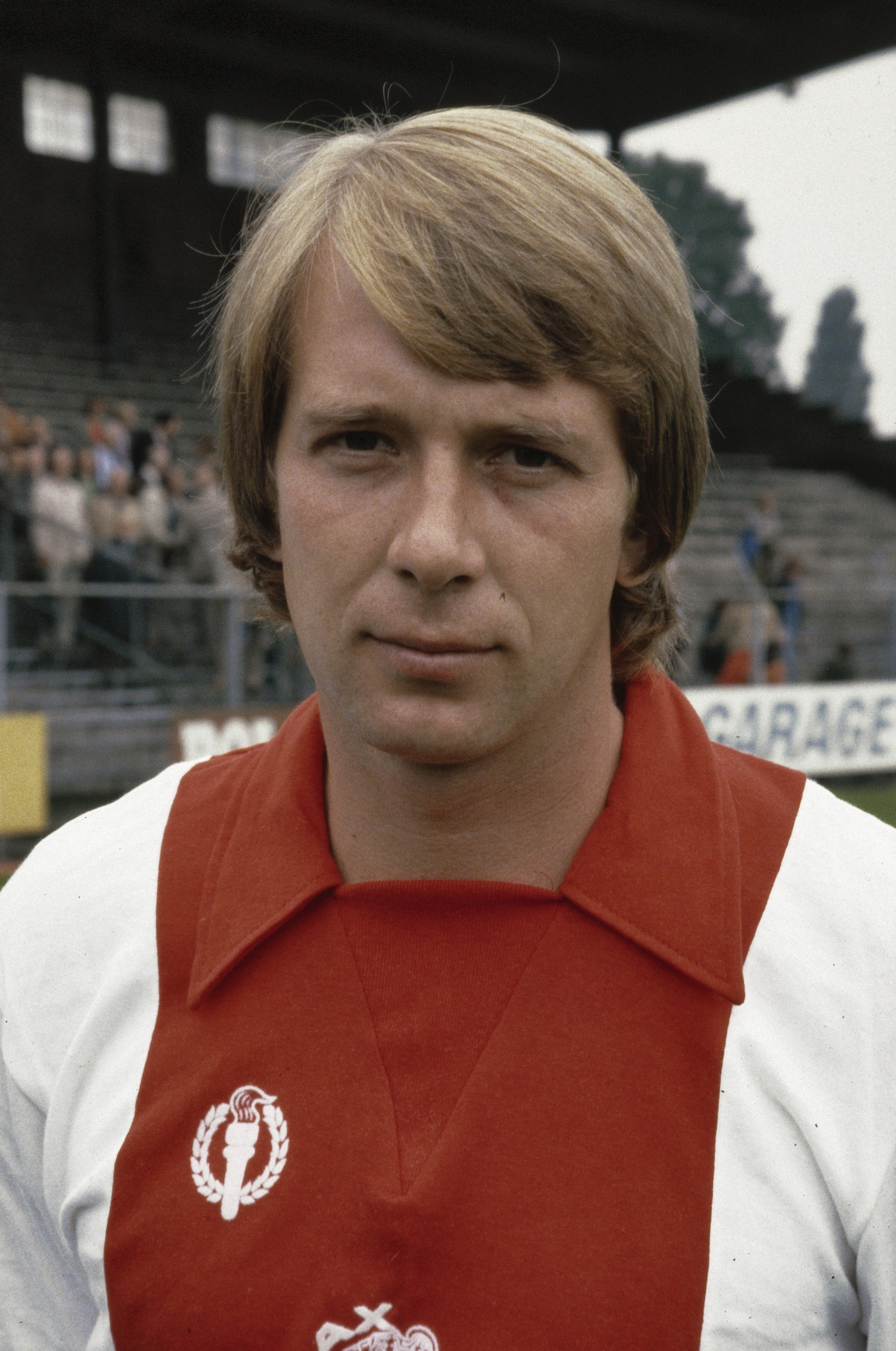
Henning Jensen, 1979

- Just Høg (1584 at Vang, Nørresundby - 1646) a Danish statesman and landowner
- Søren Jessen-Petersen (born 1945 in Nørresundby) a Danish lawyer and UN civil servant
- Frank Aaen (born 1951 in Nørresundby) a Danish economist and politician
- Orla Hav (born 1952 in Nørresundby) politician, Mayor of North Jutland County and member of the Danish Parliament
- Preben Bang Henriksen (born 1954 in Nørresundby) a Danish barrister and politician
- Tine Lindhardt (born 1957 in Nørresundby) theologist, Lutheran bishop of Diocese of Funen
- Ole Bornedal (born 1959 in Nørresundby) a Danish film director, actor and producer
- Mohamed Ali (born 1993 in Nørresundby) a Danish singer of mixed Egyptian and Iraqi origin

=== Sport ===
- Henry Nielsen (1910 in Nørresundby – 1969) a Danish middle- and long-distance runner, 3000 m world record holder 1934-1936
- Verner Nielsen (born 1931 in Nørresundby) a former footballer, played 26 games for Denmark
- Henning Jensen (1949–2017) a Danish football player, 125 club caps with Borussia Mönchengladbach and scored 9 goals in 21 games for Denmark

== Nørresundby Gymnasium & HF ==
Nørresundby Gymnasium & HF is an upper secondary school in the city of Nørresundby, in North Jutland in Denmark. The school offers the traditional three-year program but also the so-called Higher Preparatory Examination (HF), which takes two years to complete. Nørresundby Gymnasium & HF is a certified Cambridge & Science school and it is furthermore open for exchange students. The school offers 12 different streams of studies. It is one of the only ones offering Greek as a subject.

== Works cited ==
- Ørnbjerg, Jakob (2010). Slaget om Aalborg 1644 [Batte of Aalborg 1644]. Fra Himmerland og Kjær Herred (in Danish). Historisk samfund for Himmerland og Kjær Herred. ISSN 0107-9301.
