= John F. Kennedys Plads =

Square in Aalborg, Denmark

Coordinates: 57.043056°N 9.918056°E

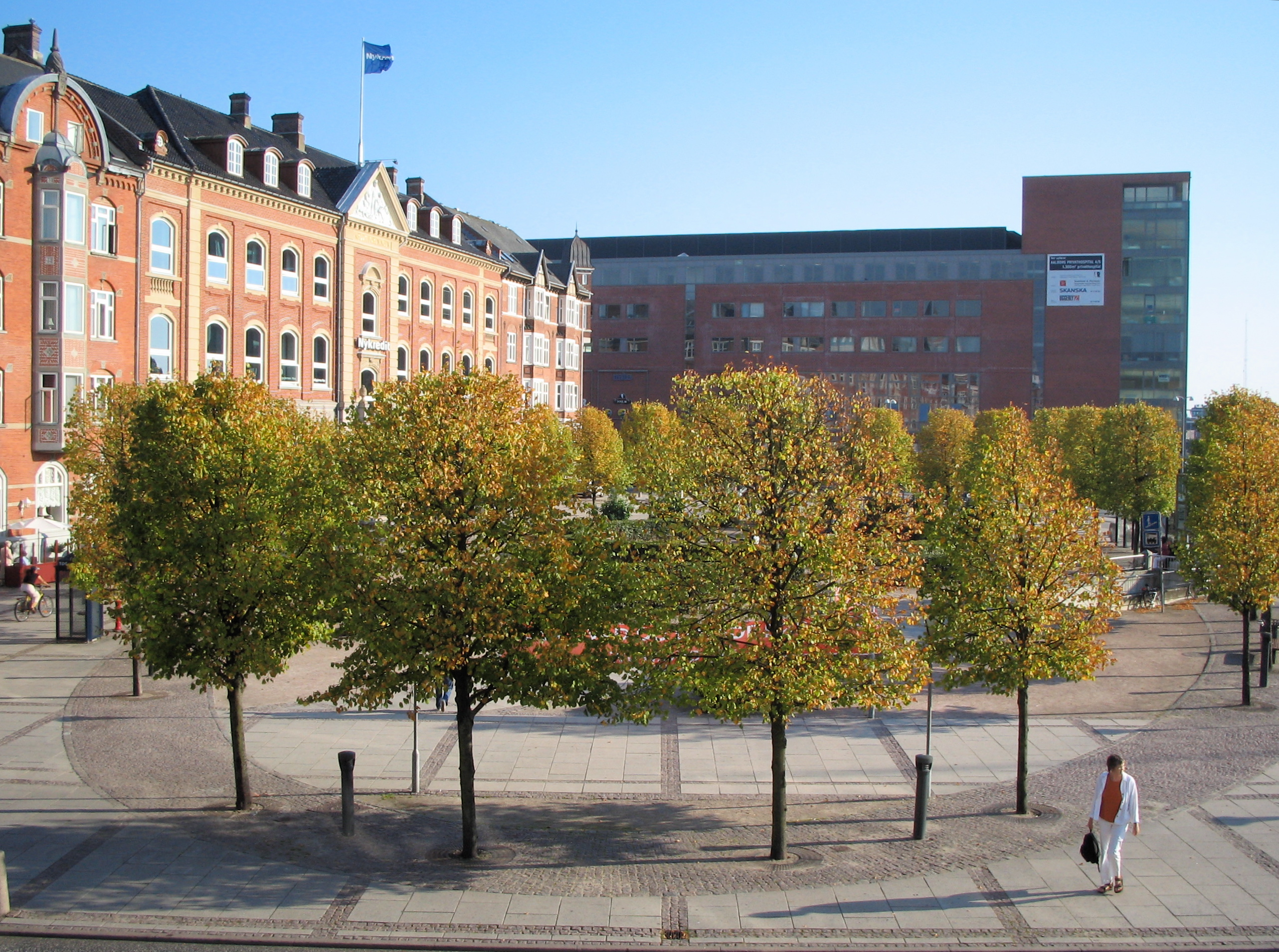
John F. Kennedy's Square

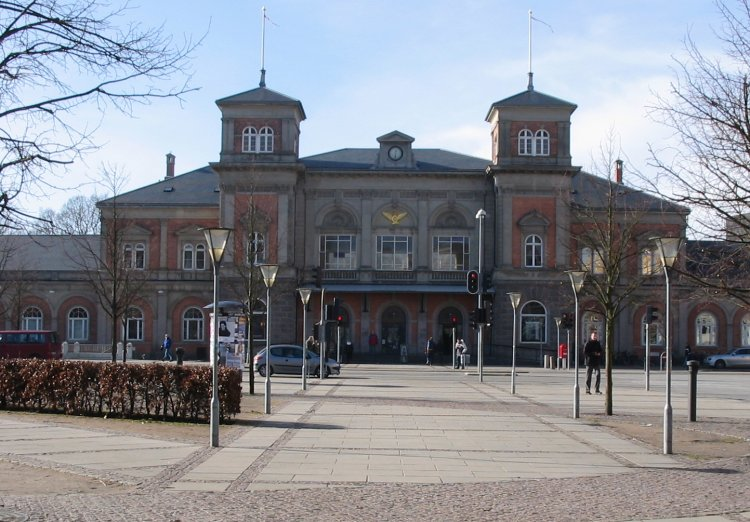
Aalborg railway station is fronted by John F. Kennedy's Square

John F. Kennedys Plads ("John F. Kennedy's Square") is located in central Aalborg, Denmark. Dedicated to the 35th President of the United States, it contains a horse and rider statue of Christian IX of Denmark. Reserved for pedestrians, the site is constructed of granite and concrete tiles. Aalborg railway station, Aalborg Bus Terminal, Kennedy Arcade, and Park Hotel Aalborg are adjacent to the square.
