= Hobro railway station =

Railway station in Hobro, Denmark

Hobro
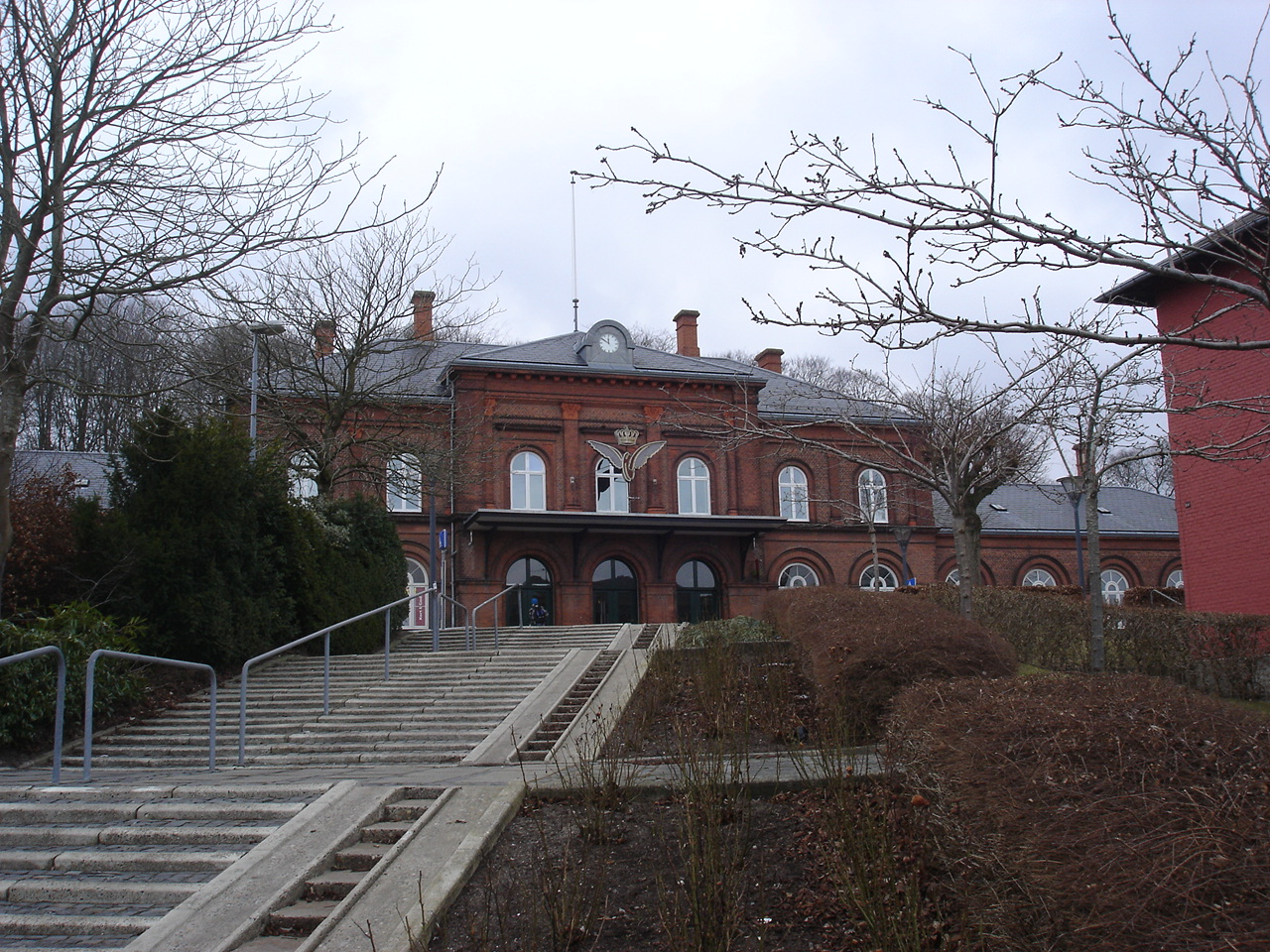
- Front facade of Hobro station

General information
- Location: Stationsvej 12; 9500 Hobro; Mariagerfjord Municipality; Denmark
- Coordinates: 56°38′36″N 9°46′57″E
- Elevation: 22.8 metres (75 ft)
- Owner: DSB (station infrastructure); Banedanmark (rail infrastructure)
- Lines: Randers–Aalborg (since 1869); Hobro–Aalestrup–Løgstør (1893–1966)
- Platforms: 2 (1 side platform and 1 island platform)
- Tracks: 3
- Train operators: DSB; Nordjyske Jernbaner

History
- Opened: 1869
- Rebuilt: 1893

Services
Preceding station	DSB	Following station
Randers towards Copenhagen Airport	Copenhagen-Aalborg InterCityLyn	Aalborg towards Aalborg Airport
Randers towards Copenhagen Central	Copenhagen-Aalborg InterCity	Skørping towards Aalborg Airport
Preceding station	Nordjyske Jernbaner	Following station
Terminus	Hobro – Skagen Regional train	Arden towards Skagen
Location

Hobro railway station (Danish: Hobro Station or Hobro Banegård) is a railway station serving the town of Hobro, Denmark. Due to the hilly terrain around Hobro, the station is located approximately 1 km (0.62 mi) west of the town centre in the hills above the town.

The station is located on the Randers–Aalborg railway line from Randers to Aalborg. It opened in 1869. Hobro station offers direct InterCity services to Copenhagen and Aalborg and regional train services to Aalborg. The train services at the station are operated by the railway companies DSB and Nordjyske Jernbaner.

== History ==
The station opened in 1869 with the opening of the Randers-Aalborg railway line from Randers to Aalborg. In 1893, Hobro Station also became the southern terminus of the new Hobro–Aalestrup–Løgstør railway line, until the section between Hobro and Aalestrup was closed in 1966.

== Architecture ==
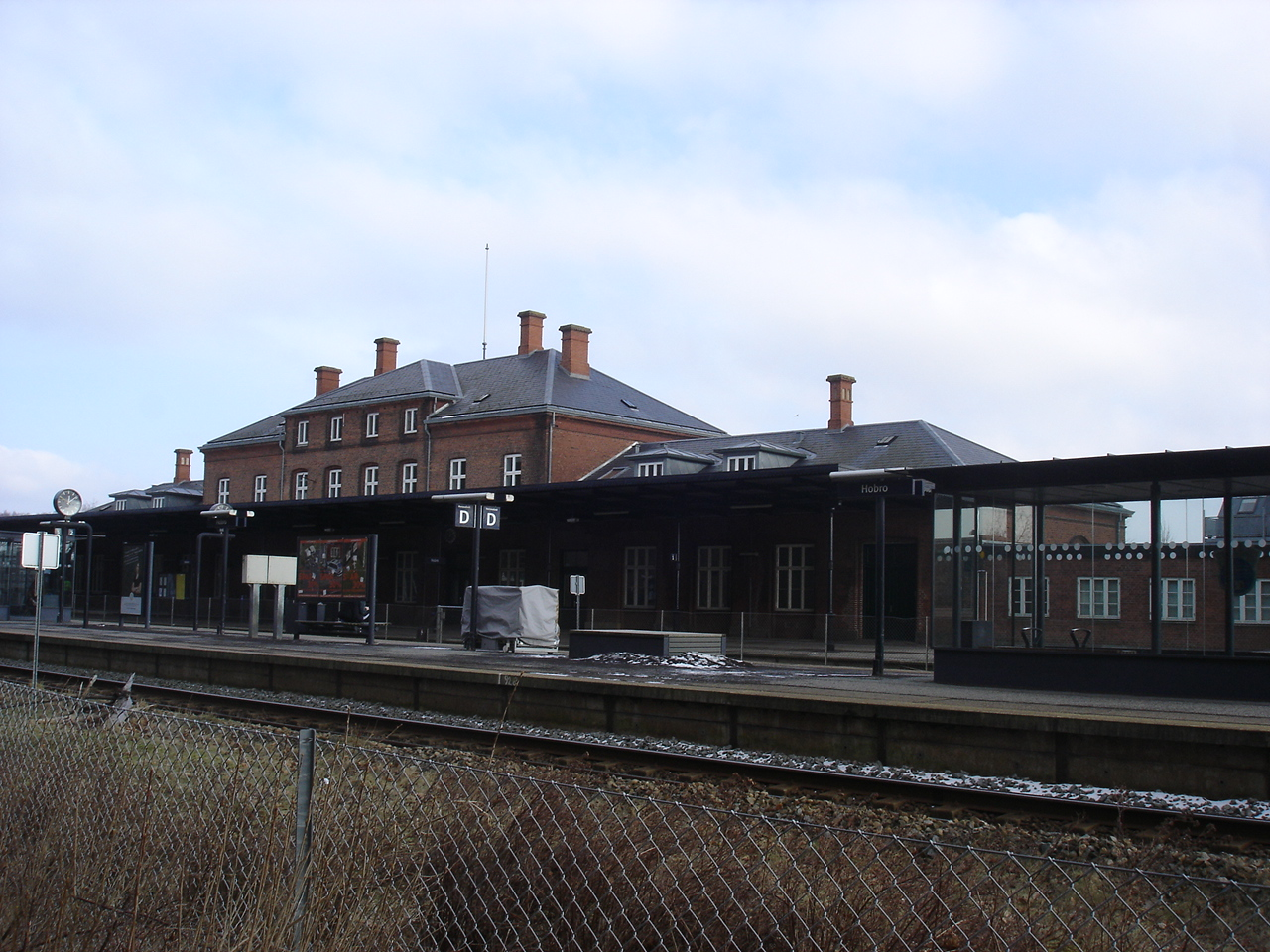
Platform facade of Hobro station

The original station building was designed by the Danish architect N.P.C. Holsøe. In 1893, the present station building opened. It was designed by the Danish architect Thomas Arboe. The station building was listed in 1992.

== Operations ==
The station offers direct InterCityLyn and InterCity services to Copenhagen and Aalborg operated by the national railway company DSB and regional train services to Aalborg operated by the regional railway company Nordjyske Jernbaner.

== See also ==
- List of railway stations in Denmark
- Rail transport in Denmark
