= Aalborg Airport railway line =

Railway line in Denmark

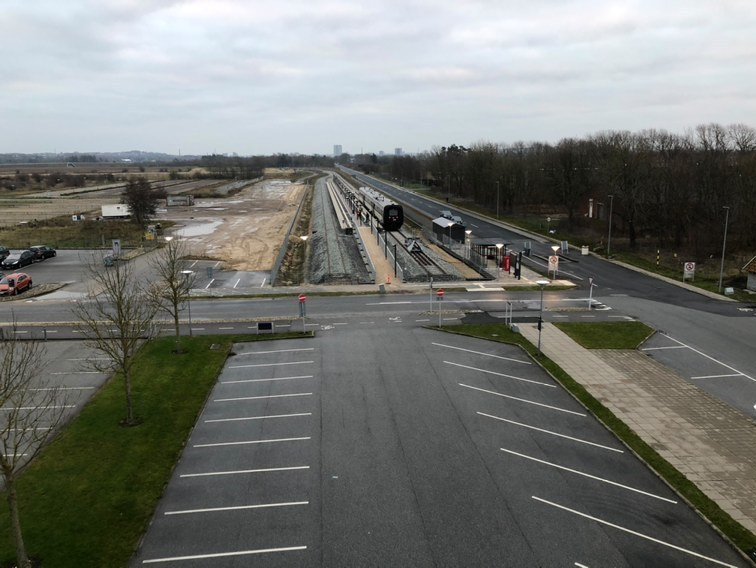
- Aalborg Airport railway station

Overview
- Locale: Aalborg, Denmark
- Termini: Lindholm station; Aalborg Airport station
- Stations: 1
- Website: www.bane.dk

Service
- Type: Commuter rail
- System: Aalborg Commuter Rail

History
- Opened: December 13, 2020; 5 years ago

Technical
- Line length: 2.8 km (1.7 mi)
- Track gauge: 1,435 mm (4 ft 8 1/2 in) standard gauge

The Aalborg Airport railway line is a branch line railway in North Jutland, Denmark that links the city of Aalborg with its airport. The 2.8 km (1.7 mi) long standard gauge single track railway line opened in 2020.

== History ==
The railway line was constructed as part of an initiative to improve transport between the city and the airport. The feasibility studies started in 2017 and were followed by detailed design and expropriation in 2018. The actual construction was in 2019 and 2020. Construction officially started in February 2019. It opened on 13 December 2020 at a cost of 276 million DKK.

== Route ==
The line starts as a branch line north of Lindholm Station. A new station was built at the airport, with a bridge built over Lindholm Å.

== See also ==
- List of airport rail link systems
- List of railway lines in Denmark
- Rail transport in Denmark
- History of rail transport in Denmark
