= Aalborg Airport =

Airport in Nørresundby, Denmark

Aalborg Airport Aalborg Lufthavn

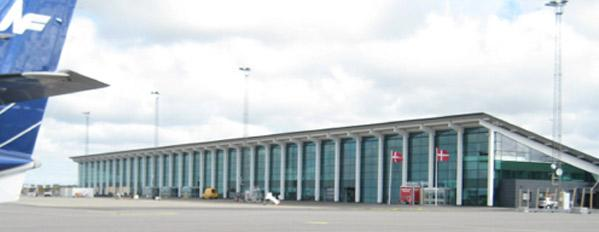
- IATA: AAL; ICAO: EKYT

Summary
- Airport type: Public / military
- Operator: Aalborg Lufthavn a.m.b.a.
- Serves: Aalborg, Denmark
- Location: Nørresundby
- Elevation AMSL: 10 ft (3.0 m)
- Coordinates: 57°05′34″N 009°50′57″E
- Website: aal.dk

Map
- Location of airport in Denmark

Runways
Direction	Length		Surface
Direction	m	ft	Surface
08L/26R	2,654	8,707	Concrete / asphalt / bitumen
08R/26L	2,549	8,363	Asphalt

Statistics (2015)
- Passengers: 1,456,496
- Domestic: 882.234
- International incl. charter: 527,633
- Source: Danish AIP

Aalborg Airport (Danish: Aalborg Lufthavn) (IATA: AAL, ICAO: EKYT) is a dual-use (civilian/military) airport located in Nørresundby, Aalborg Municipality, Denmark, which is 3.5 NM (6.5 km; 4.0 mi) northwest of Aalborg.

== History ==
Aalborg Airport was opened in 1938 as the second national airport. During World War II, Aalborg was occupied and used by the German Air Force. The 3rd and 5th squadrons of Bordfliegergruppe 196 (Embarked Air Group 196) as well as the group's staff unit, used Aalborg as a base for maritime reconnaissance flights and detachments serving aboard German Navy surface combatants.

The present terminal building is from 2001. The airport was enlarged during 2007 and 2013, increasing the terminal size and number of gates.

Aalborg Airport has experienced substantial turnover in its international route network, with a number of routes launched by major carriers subsequently being reduced or discontinued after relatively short periods of operation. In 2017, CHECK-IN.dk described international scheduled traffic as a particular challenge for the airport following the withdrawal of Lufthansa and Turkish Airlines, while several other international routes had also been discontinued in the preceding years.

Norwegian Air Shuttle previously operated flights to Paris–Charles de Gaulle, Berlin, and Oslo. The Oslo service was discontinued in January 2014 due to insufficient profitability. Norwegian had also previously withdrawn leisure routes including Alicante and Gran Canaria, although these destinations were later reintroduced.

Turkish Airlines operated flights to Istanbul Atatürk from 2012 to 2016. The route was discontinued following declining passenger numbers and insufficient profitability.

Lufthansa operated services to Frankfurt from March 2015 until September 2016. The route was initially operated with multiple weekly frequencies but was substantially reduced before being discontinued. Lufthansa cited insufficient profitability as well as the lack of suitably sized aircraft within its fleet.

DAT previously operated international flights to Stavanger, but withdrew from the route in 2014. The airline also operated domestic services between Aalborg and Copenhagen, which were discontinued in March 2024.

Other carriers have also withdrawn services from Aalborg over the years. Both Norwegian and SAS operated routes to Oslo at different times, while Sun-Air also discontinued its Aalborg–Oslo service in December 2018 after citing excess capacity and competitive pressure. Ryanair previously operated services to Kaunas and Stockholm Arlanda, with the Kaunas route ending in October 2023.

More recently, Aalborg has continued to experience notable changes in its international scheduled network. SAS discontinued its transatlantic service to Newark after the final flight on 26 October 2023, and the route was not resumed for the 2024 summer season.

In March 2025, Ryanair withdrew completely from Aalborg Airport, ending its remaining services to London Stansted and Girona. Ryanair nevertheless continued operating from nearby Aarhus Airport, where the airline maintained and subsequently expanded its presence..

These withdrawals added to a series of international route closures at Aalborg Airport over the preceding years and illustrate the considerable turnover that has characterised parts of the airport's international scheduled network.

== Facilities ==
The airport is at an elevation of 10 feet (3 m) above mean sea level. It has two runways: 08L/26R is 2,654 by 45 metres (8,707 ft × 148 ft) and 08R/26L is 2,549 by 23 metres (8,363 ft × 75 ft).

== Airlines and destinations ==
The following airlines operate regular scheduled and charter flights at the airport:

Airlines	Destinations
Atlantic Airways	Seasonal: Vágar
Air Greenland	Seasonal: Nuuk
Corendon Airlines	Seasonal: Gazipaşa
DAT	Seasonal: Bornholm
KLM	Amsterdam
Norwegian Air Shuttle	Copenhagen, London–Gatwick, Málaga; Seasonal: Alicante, Funchal, Nice, Palma de Mallorca, Tenerife–South
Pegasus Airlines	Seasonal: Antalya
Scandinavian Airlines	Copenhagen, Oslo; Seasonal: Sälen-Trysil
Sunclass Airlines	Seasonal charter: Gran Canaria, Palma de Mallorca, Tenerife–South
Volotea	Seasonal: Naples, Verona

== Other facilities ==
North Flying has its head office in the North Flying Terminal at Aalborg Airport. Greenland Express had its headquarters at the airport as well.

== Ground transport ==
=== Train ===
The airport is served by Aalborg Airport railway station on the Aalborg Airport railway line. The trains go to Copenhagen Central Station, calling at three stops in Aalborg and then several cities along the route. The station started operation on 13 December 2020.

=== Bus ===
City buses also go from the airport.

== See also ==
- List of the largest airports in the Nordic countries
