= Aalborg Airport railway station =

Airport railway station in North Jutland, Denmark

Aalborg Lufthavn
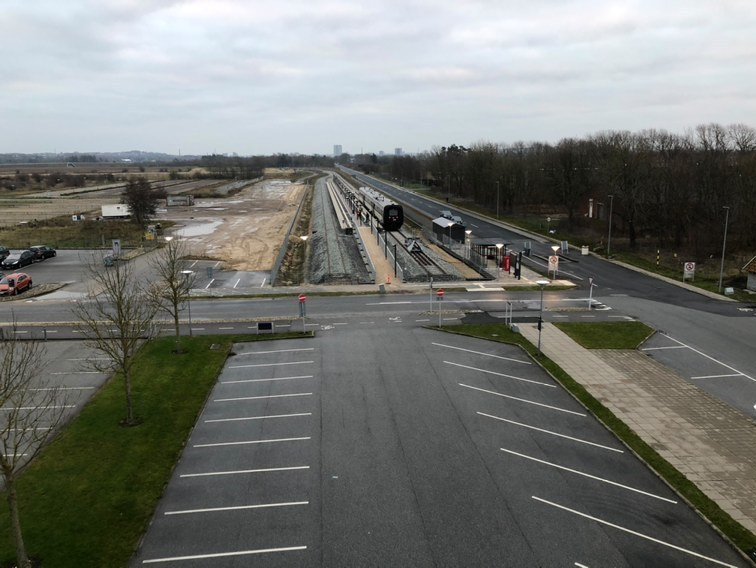
- Aalborg Airport railway station on the opening day in December 2020

General information
- Location: Ny Lufthavnsvej 100; 9400 Nørresundby; Aalborg Municipality; Denmark
- Coordinates: 57°05′03″N 9°52′33″E
- Elevation: 2.5 metres (8 ft 2 in)
- Owner: Banedanmark
- Line: Aalborg Airport railway line
- Platforms: 1 island platform
- Tracks: 2
- Train operators: DSB

Other information
- Website: Official website

History
- Opened: December 13, 2020; 5 years ago

Services
Preceding station	DSB	Following station
Lindholm towards Copenhagen Airport	Copenhagen-Aalborg InterCityLyn	Terminus
Lindholm towards Copenhagen Central	Copenhagen-Aalborg InterCity	Terminus
Location

Aalborg Airport railway station (Danish: Aalborg Lufthavn Station) is a railway station serving Aalborg Airport near the city of Aalborg in North Jutland, Denmark.

The station is the terminus of the Aalborg Airport railway line which links Aalborg Airport with the city of Aalborg. The station opened on 13 December 2020 with the opening of the railway line. The train services are operated by the railway company DSB which runs frequent train services from Aalborg Airport to Nørresundby and Aalborg with onwards connections to the rest of Denmark.

== See also ==
- Aalborg Airport
- List of railway stations in Denmark
- Rail transport in Denmark
- Transport in Denmark
