= Tolne railway station =

Railway station in North Jutland, Denmark

Tolne
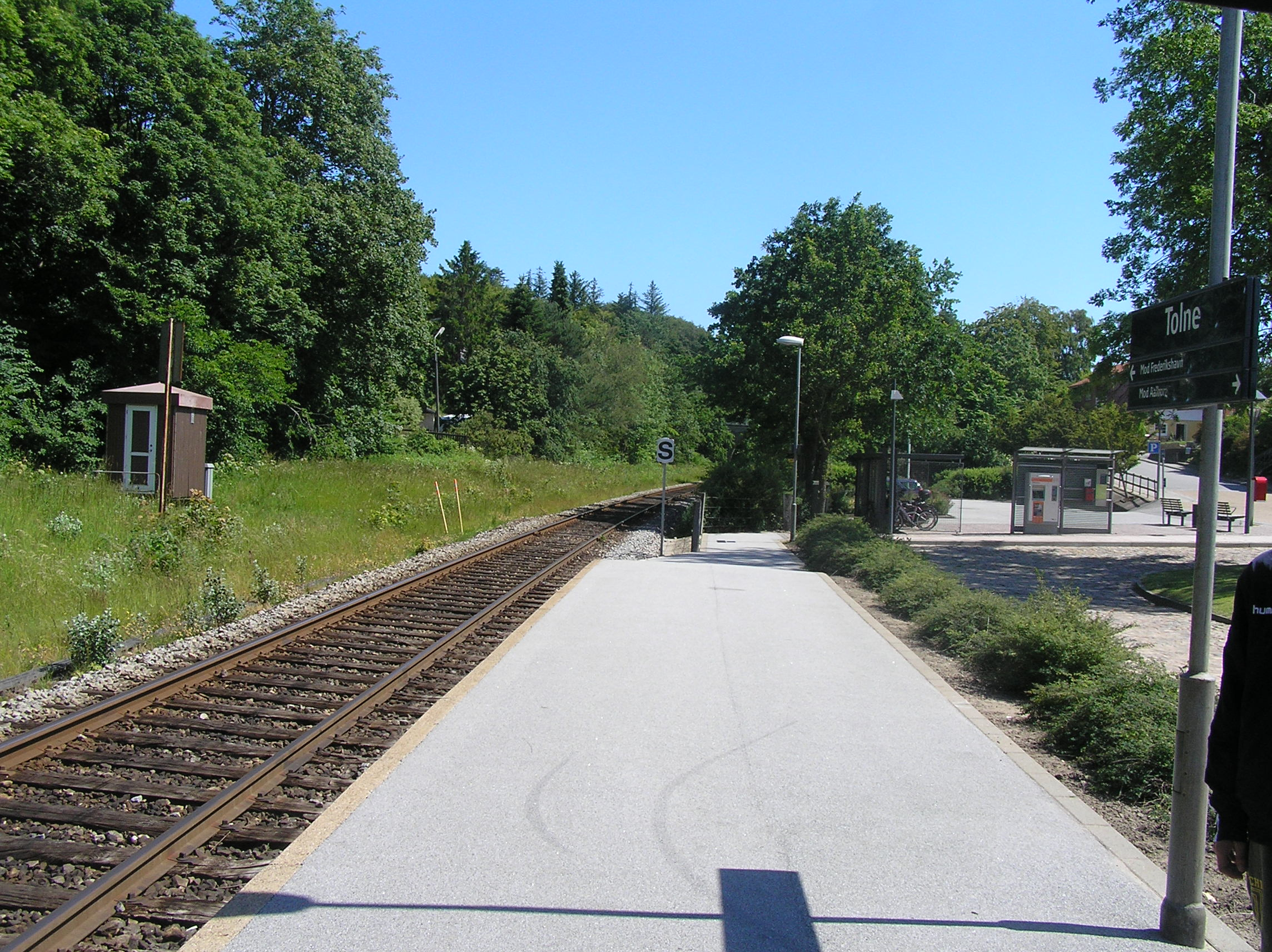
- Tolne station in 2009

General information
- Location: Kirkevej 293; Tolne, 9870 Sindal; Hjørring Municipality; Denmark
- Coordinates: 57°29′9.05″N 10°18′48.72″E
- Elevation: 53.6 metres (176 ft)
- Owner: Banedanmark
- Line: Vendsyssel Line
- Platforms: 1 side platform
- Tracks: 1
- Train operators: Nordjyske Jernbaner

History
- Opened: 1873

Services
Preceding station	Nordjyske Jernbaner	Following station
Sindal towards Hobro	Hobro – Skagen Regional train	Kvissel towards Skagen
Sindal towards Hjørring	Hjørring – Skagen Local train Peak hours	Kvissel towards Skagen
Location
- Location within Denmark

Tolne railway station is a railway station serving the village of Tolne in Tolne hills in Vendsyssel, Denmark.

The station is located on the Vendsyssel Line from Aalborg to Frederikshavn, between Sindal station and Kvissel station. The train services are operated by the Nordjyske Jernbaner railway company that runs frequent regional train services to Aalborg and Frederikshavn.

== History ==
The station opened in 1873 as a halt on the new Nørresundby-Frederikshavn railway line as the branch from Nørresundby to Frederikshavn opened on 16 August 1871. It was promoted to a station in 1879 when the station building designed by N.P.C. Holsøe was completed.

On 7 January 1879, at the opening of the Limfjord Railway Bridge, the Vendsyssel line was connected with Aalborg station, the Randers-Aalborg railway line and the rest of the Danish rail network.

On 12 June 1942, the station was the site of the Tolne railway crash, where a stopping passenger train from Aalborg was hit head-on by a freight train from Frederikshavn right in front of the station building. Two people were killed and five people were seriously injured in the accident.

The station was closed in 1972 but continued as a halt. The station building was demolished in 1985. In 2017, operation of the regional rail services on the Vendsyssel Line to Aalborg and Frederikshavn were transferred from the national railway company DSB to the regional railway company Nordjyske Jernbaner.

== See also ==
- List of railway stations in Denmark
- Rail transport in Denmark
- History of rail transport in Denmark
