= Sindal railway station =

Railway station in Vendsyssel, Denmark

Sindal
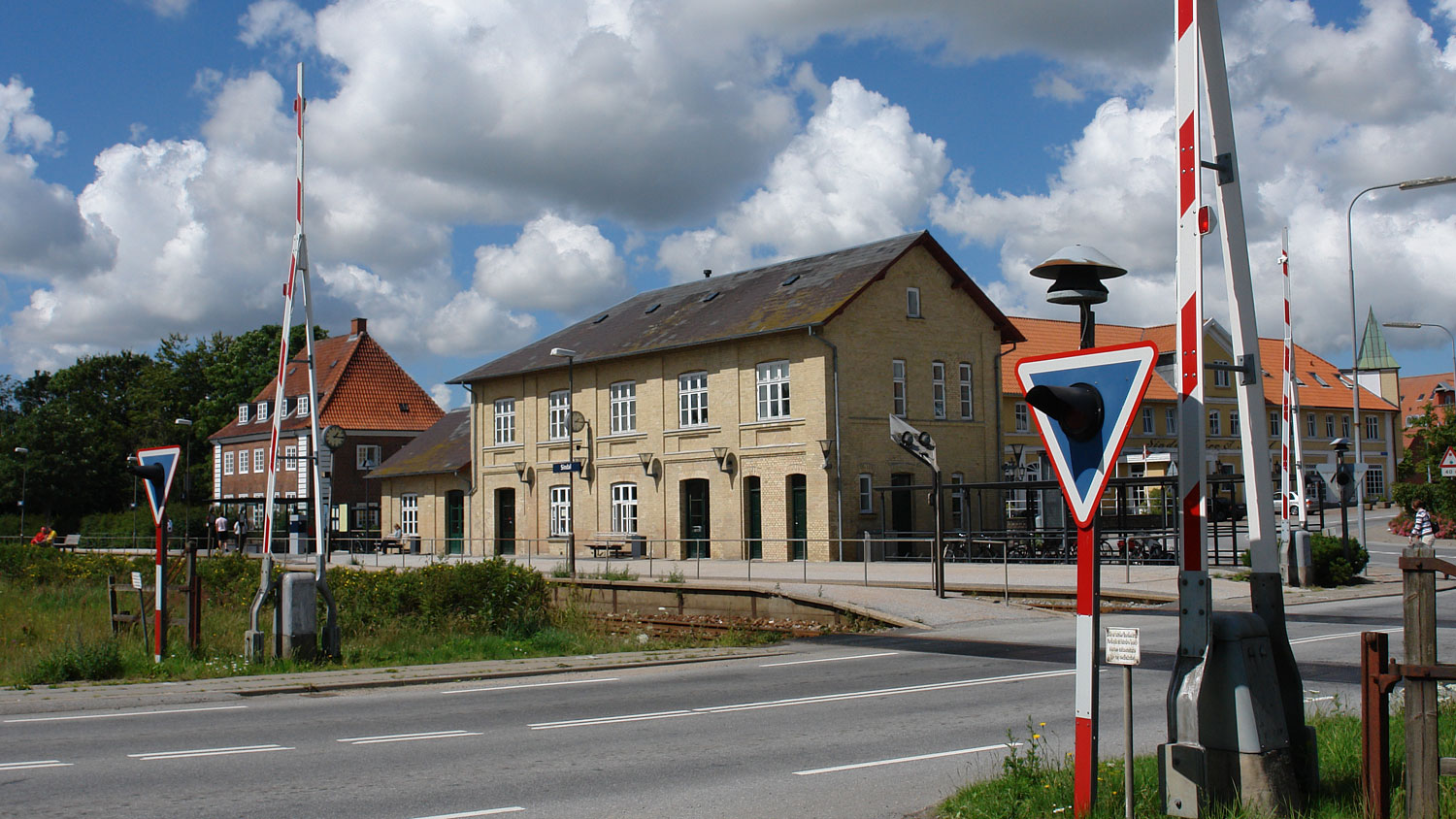
- Sindal station in 2008

General information
- Location: Jernbanegade 8; 9870 Sindal; Hjørring Municipality; Denmark
- Coordinates: 57°28′12.63″N 10°12′07.03″E
- Elevation: 22.0 metres (72.2 ft)
- Owner: DSB (station infrastructure); Banedanmark (rail infrastructure)
- Line: Vendsyssel Line
- Platforms: 2 side platforms
- Tracks: 2
- Train operators: Nordjyske Jernbaner

History
- Opened: 1871

Services
Preceding station	Nordjyske Jernbaner	Following station
Hjørring East towards Hobro	Hobro – Skagen Regional train	Tolne towards Skagen
Hjørring East towards Hjørring	Hjørring – Skagen Local train Peak hours	Tolne towards Skagen
Location
- Location within Denmark

Sindal railway station is a railway station serving the railway town of Sindal in Vendsyssel, Denmark.

The station is located on the Vendsyssel railway line from Aalborg to Frederikshavn, between Hjørring and Tolne stations. It opened in 1871. The train services are currently operated by the railway company Nordjyske Jernbaner which runs frequent regional train services from the station to Aalborg and Frederikshavn.

== History ==
The station opened in 1871 as the initial section from Nørresundby to Frederikshavn of the new Nørresundby-Frederikshavn railway line opened on 16 August 1871.

On 7 January 1879, at the opening of the Limfjord Railway Bridge, the Vendsyssel line was connected with Aalborg station, the Randers-Aalborg railway line and the rest of the Danish rail network.

Today, the station is closed but continues as a halt.

In 2017, operation of the regional rail services on the Vendsyssel Line to Aalborg and Frederikshavn were transferred from the national railway company DSB to the regional railway company Nordjyske Jernbaner (NJ).

== Architecture ==
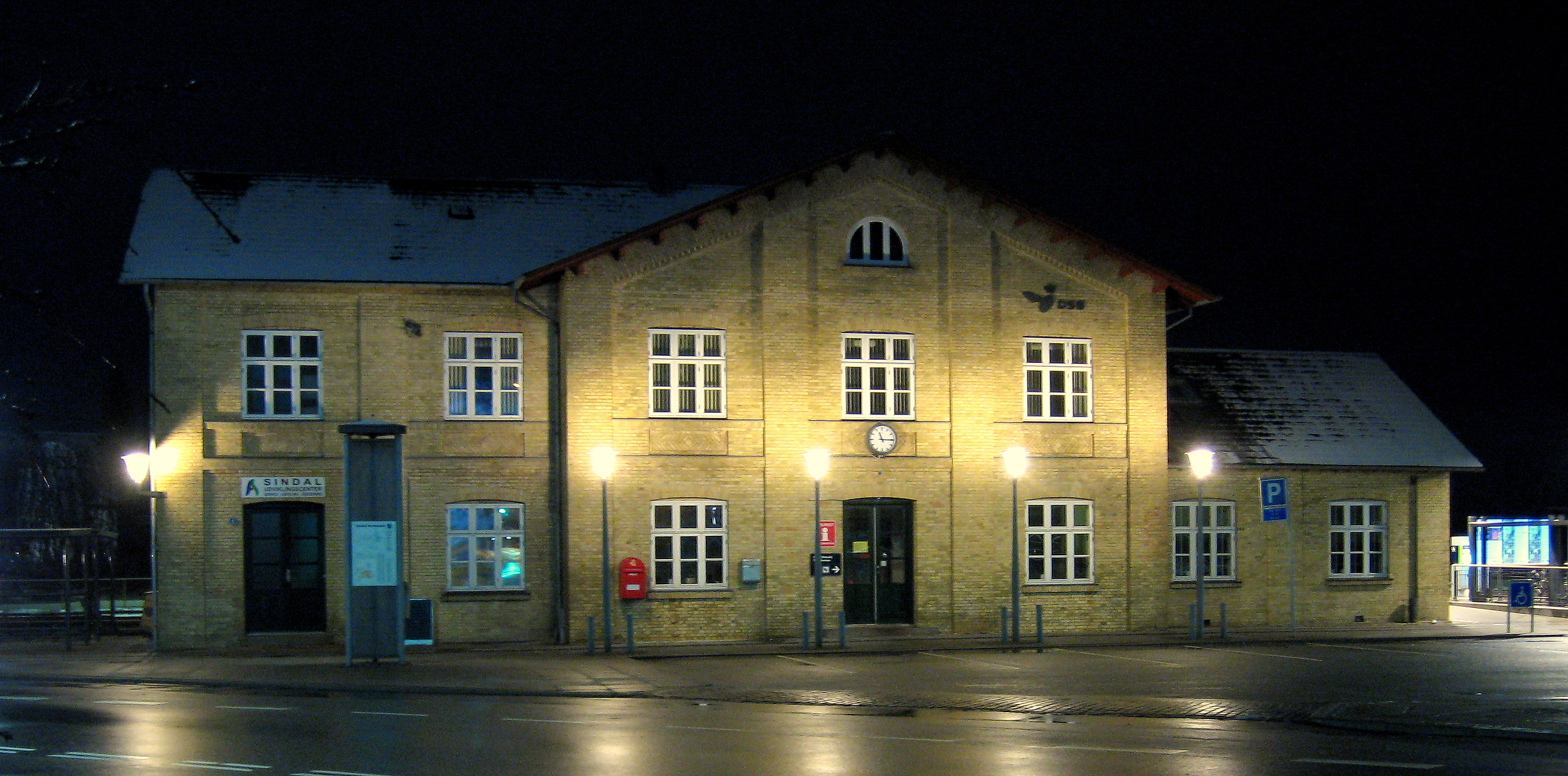
Street facade of the station building by night.

The station building from 1871 was built to designs by the Danish architect Niels Peder Christian Holsøe (1826–1895), known for the numerous railway stations he designed across Denmark in his capacity of head architect of the Danish State Railways.

== Train services ==
The train services are currently operated by the railway company Nordjyske Jernbaner which runs frequent regional train services from the station to Aalborg and Frederikshavn.

The direct InterCity service from the station to Copenhagen operated by the national railway company DSB ceased in 2019.

== Gallery ==
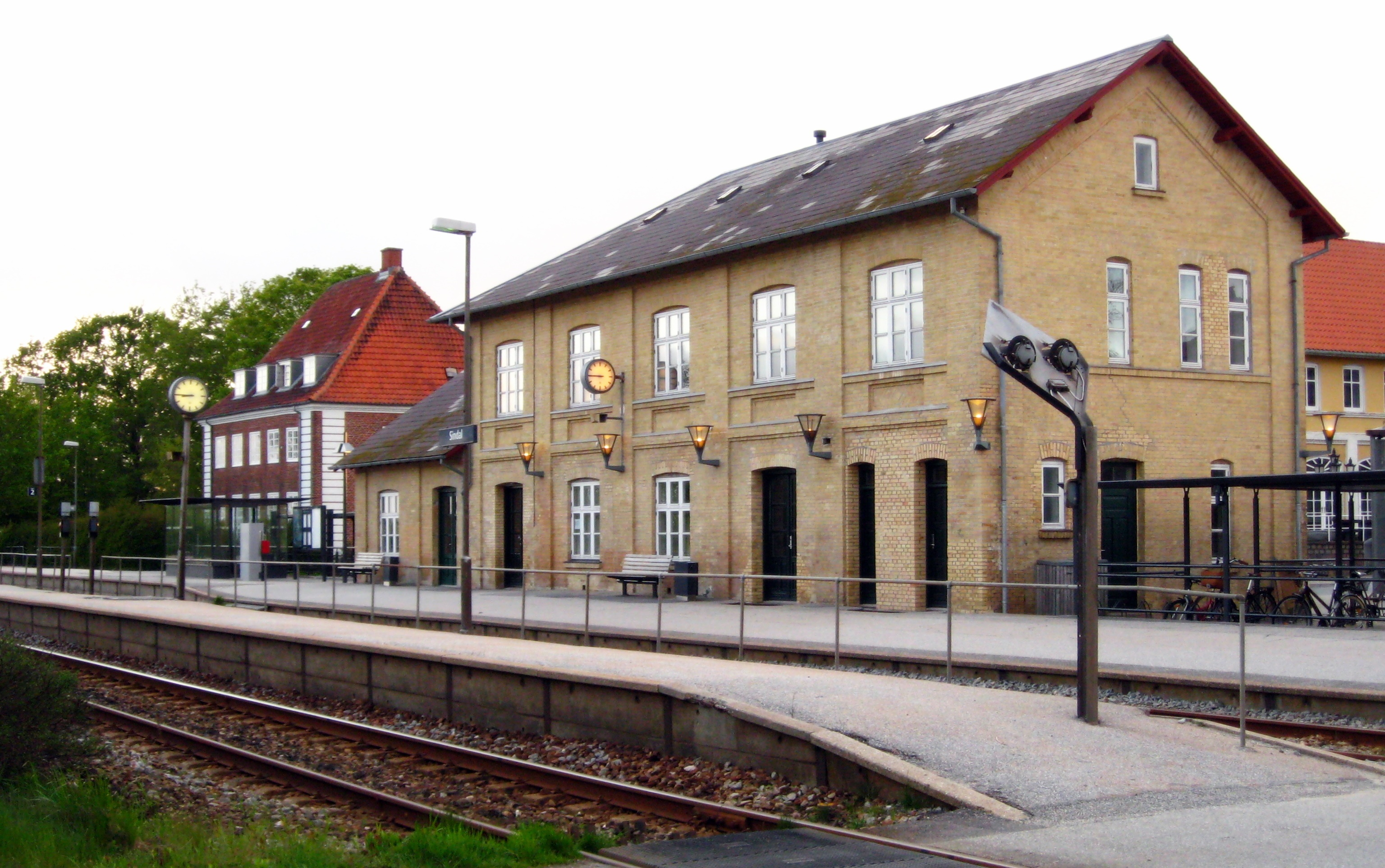
Sindal railway station in May 2009

== See also ==
- List of railway stations in Denmark
- Rail transport in Denmark
- History of rail transport in Denmark
