= Kvissel railway station =

Railway station in North Jutland, Denmark

Kvissel
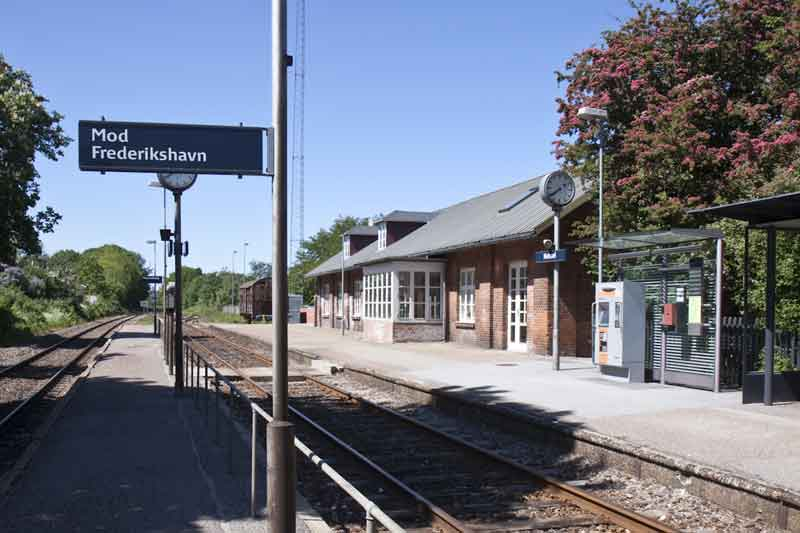
- Kvissel station in May 2009

General information
- Location: Tolnevej 1 Kvissel, 9990 Frederikshavn; Frederikshavn Municipality; Denmark
- Coordinates: 57°28′19.79″N 10°24′45.72″E
- Elevation: 14.6 metres (48 ft)
- Owner: DSB (station infrastructure); Banedanmark (rail infrastructure)
- Line: Vendsyssel railway line
- Platforms: 2 side platforms
- Tracks: 2
- Train operators: Nordjyske Jernbaner

Construction
- Architect: Niels Peder Christian Holsøe

Other information
- Station code: Kv

History
- Opened: 15 August 1871; 155 years ago

Services
Preceding station	Nordjyske Jernbaner	Following station
Tolne towards Hobro	Hobro – Skagen Regional train	Frederikshavn towards Skagen
Tolne towards Hjørring	Hjørring – Skagen Local train Peak hours	Frederikshavn towards Skagen
Location
- Location within Denmark

Kvissel railway station is a railway station serving the village of Kvissel about 10 km northwest of the town of Frederikshavn in Vendsyssel, Denmark. The station is situated in the centre of the village, a short distance from Kvissel Church.

Kvissel station is located on the Vendsyssel railway line between Aalborg and Frederikshavn, between Tolne station and Frederikshavn station. It opened in 1871. The train services are operated by the railway company Nordjyske Jernbaner which runs frequent regional train services from the station to Aalborg and Frederikshavn.

== History ==
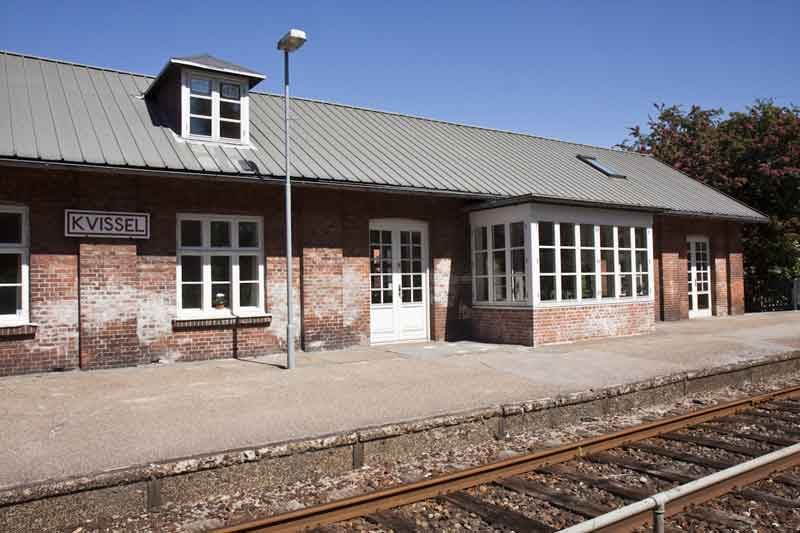
The station building in 2009.

The station opened in 1871 as a railway halt on the new Vendsyssel railway line as the section from Nørresundby to Frederikshavn opened on 15 August 1871. It was promoted to a station in 1877, and the station building was constructed. On 7 January 1879, at the opening of the Limfjord Railway Bridge, the Vendsyssel line was connected with Aalborg station, the Randers-Aalborg railway line and the rest of the Danish rail network.

When the station on the line was built in 1877, it brought economic growth to the village, and the railway line would become the major growth factor for Kvissel in the following years.

The station was closed in 1982 but continued as a railway halt. In 2017, operation of the regional rail services on the Vendsyssel railway line to Aalborg and Frederikshavn were transferred from DSB to the local railway company Nordjyske Jernbaner.

From June to November 2026, the station is being renovated with the passenger platforms being raised from 26 cm (10 in) to 55 cm (22 in) and the accessibility at the station being improved.

== Architecture ==
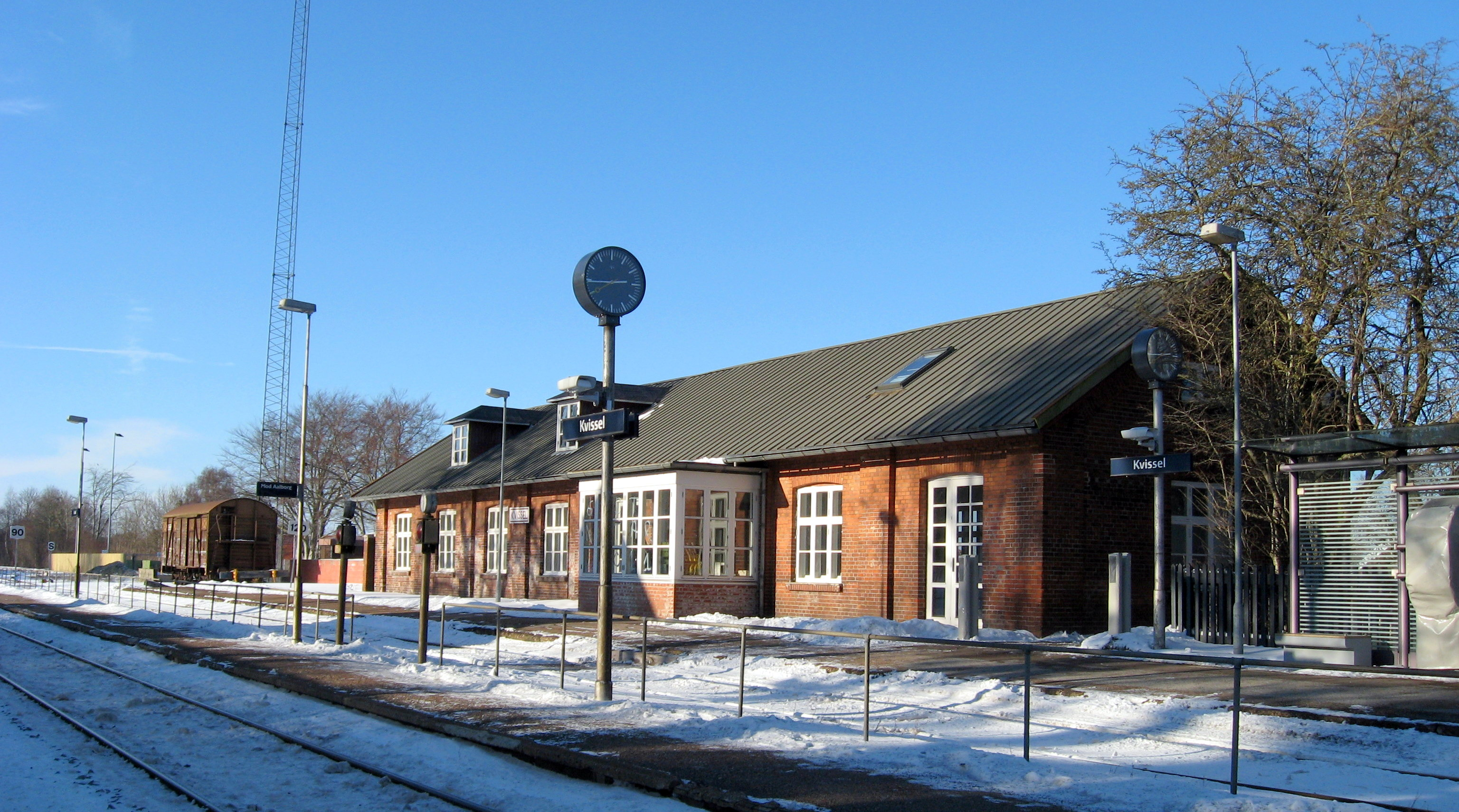
The station building in February 2009.

The station building from 1876 was built to a design by the Danish railway architect Niels Peder Christian Holsøe (1826–1895), known for the numerous railway stations he designed across Denmark in his capacity of head architect of the Danish State Railways.

Today, the historic and renovated station building functions as a civic and cultural centre of the village of Kvissel and hosts events throughout the year, such as art exhibitions and musical performances.

== Train services ==
The train services are currently operated by the regional railway company Nordjyske Jernbaner (NJ) which operates in the North Jutland Region. NJ runs frequent regional train services from the station to Aalborg and Frederikshavn.

== Gallery ==
DSB train arriving to Kvissel station in 2011 (video)

== See also ==
- List of railway stations in Denmark
- Rail transport in Denmark
- History of rail transport in Denmark
- Transport in Denmark
