= Martin Mortensen =

Martin Mortensen may refer to:

- Martin Mortensen (cyclist) (born 1984), Danish racing cyclist
- Martin Mortensen (academic) (1872–1953), American professor and head of the Department of Dairy Industry at Iowa State College
