= Svenstrup, Aalborg Municipality =

Svenstrup
- Town
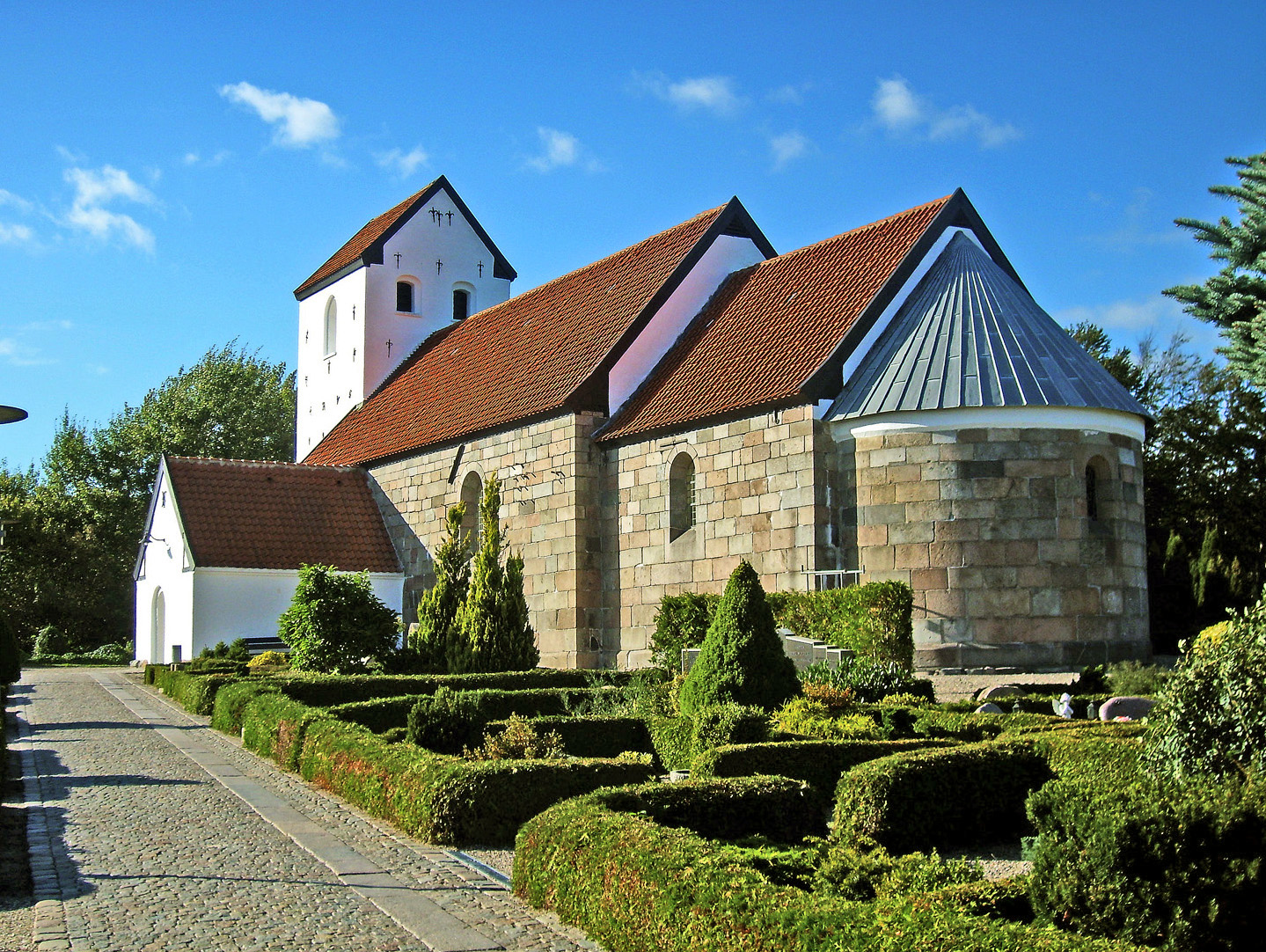
- Svenstrup Church

- Location in Denmark Svenstrup (North Jutland Region)
- Coordinates: 56°58′36″N 09°50′31″E
- Country: Denmark
- Region: North Denmark (Nordjylland)
- Municipality: Aalborg
- Established: 18th century

Area
  - Urban: 5.2 km^{2} (2.0 sq mi)
- Elevation: 23 m (75 ft)

Population (2026)
  - Urban: 8,002
  - Urban density: 1,500/km^{2} (4,000/sq mi)
  - Gender: 3,951 males and 4,051 females
- Time zone: UTC+1 (CET)
  - Summer (DST): UTC+2 (CEST)
- Postal code: DK-9230 Svenstrup J

Svenstrup is a town in Aalborg Municipality with a population of 8,002 (2026), Region Nordjylland in Denmark. It is located 10 km south of Aalborg's city centre and 3 km south of the southern outskirts of the city.

Svenstrup is served by Svenstrup railway station on the Randers–Aalborg railway line. The station re-opened in 2003.

The Battle of Svenstrup was fought during the Count's Feud in 1534 on the fields just outside Svenstrup.

== Notable people ==
- Jan Ø. Jørgensen (born 1987 in Svenstrup), badminton player
- Nicklas Helenius (born 1991), footballer
