= Skalborg =

Neighbourhood of Aalborg, Denmark

Coordinates: 57°01′N 9°54′E

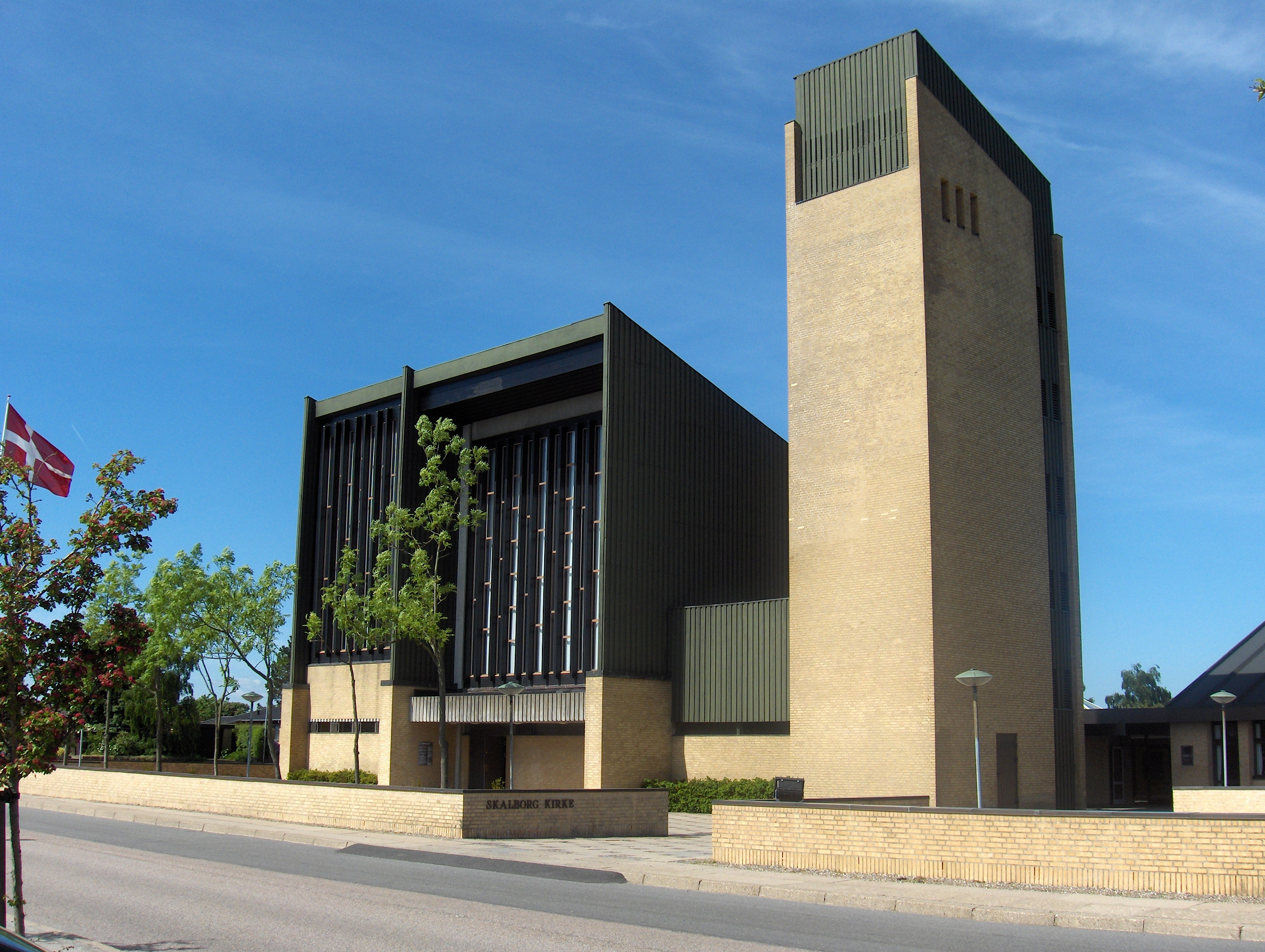
Skalborg Church in Aalborg

Skalborg is a neighbourhood in southern Aalborg, Denmark. It is located approximately 6 km south of the city center. Skalborg has a population of 8,696 (2024) and an area of approximately 8 km^{2}.

== History ==
Skalborg was originally an independent village that arose around a collection of emigrant farms near the present-day intersection of Nibevej and Hobrovej. Historically, the railway has also played a large role in the development of Skalborg, as it is connected by the Skalborg railway station to the Randers–Aalborg railway line.

Since 1992, there has also been a large and ongoing focus on retail and business development in Skalborg. City Syd, a large shopping district, and Skalborg Sportsklub are located in Skalborg.

In 2017, Aalborg Municipality created an urban development plan for Skalborg, which has meant that large parts of the district have been renovated and that new residential areas such as Oasen, Sofiendal Enge, and Sofiendalen have emerged. Aalborg Municipality has a desire to continue to develop Skalborg into a residential area, and green areas and cycle paths are being established to support this plan.
