= Støvring railway station =

Railway station in North Jutland, Denmark

Støvring
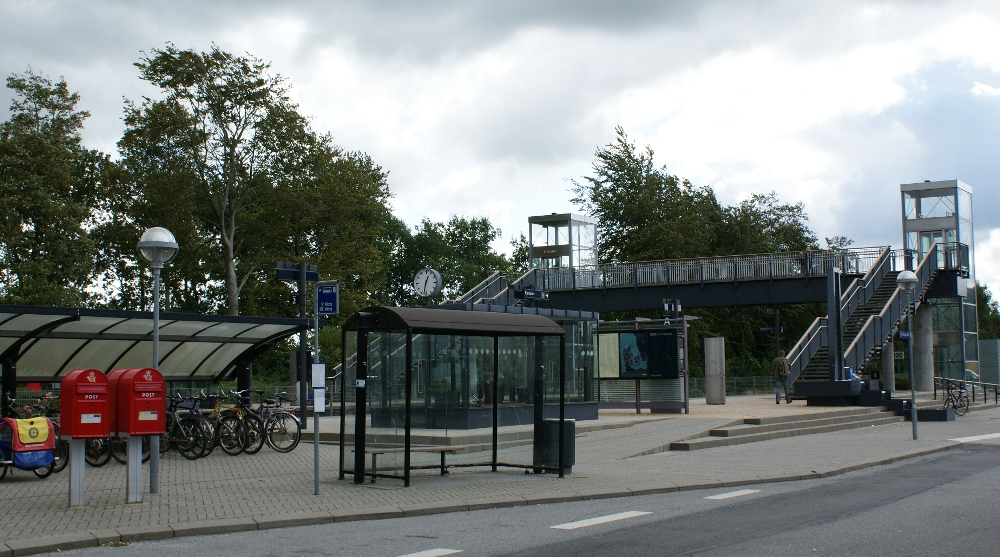
- Støvring station in 2009

General information
- Location: Borup Allé 1a 9530 Støvring; Rebild Municipality; Denmark
- Coordinates: 56°53′31″N 9°50′38″E
- Elevation: 16.3 metres (53 ft)
- Owner: DSB (station infrastructure); Banedanmark (rail infrastructure)
- Line: Randers–Aalborg
- Platforms: 2 side platforms
- Tracks: 2
- Train operators: Nordjyske Jernbaner

History
- Opened: 1869, 2003
- Closed: 1974

Services
Preceding station	Nordjyske Jernbaner	Following station
Skørping towards Hobro	Hobro – Skagen Regional train	Svenstrup towards Skagen
Skørping Terminus	Skørping – Hirtshals Regional train Peak hours	Svenstrup towards Hirtshals
Location

Støvring railway station is a railway station serving the railway town of Støvring in Himmerland south of Aalborg, Denmark.

The station is located on the Randers–Aalborg railway line between Randers and Aalborg. The station opened in 1869, closed in 1974, and reopened in 2003. The train services are currently operated by the railway company Nordjyske Jernbaner.

== History ==
The station opened in 1869 with the opening of the Randers–Aalborg railway line from Randers to Aalborg. The station closed in 1974 during a series of station closures in the 1970s, but the station reopened in 2003 as a part of the new Aalborg Commuter Rail service. In 2017, operation of the commuter rail services to Aalborg and Skørping were transferred from DSB to the regional railway company Nordjyske Jernbaner.

== Operations ==
The train services at the station are operated by the regional railway company Nordjyske Jernbaner. The station offers regional train services to Hobro, Skørping and Aalborg.

== See also ==
- List of railway stations in Denmark
- Rail transport in Denmark
- History of rail transport in Denmark
- Transport in Denmark
