= Skalborg railway station =

Railway station in Aalborg, Denmark

Skalborg
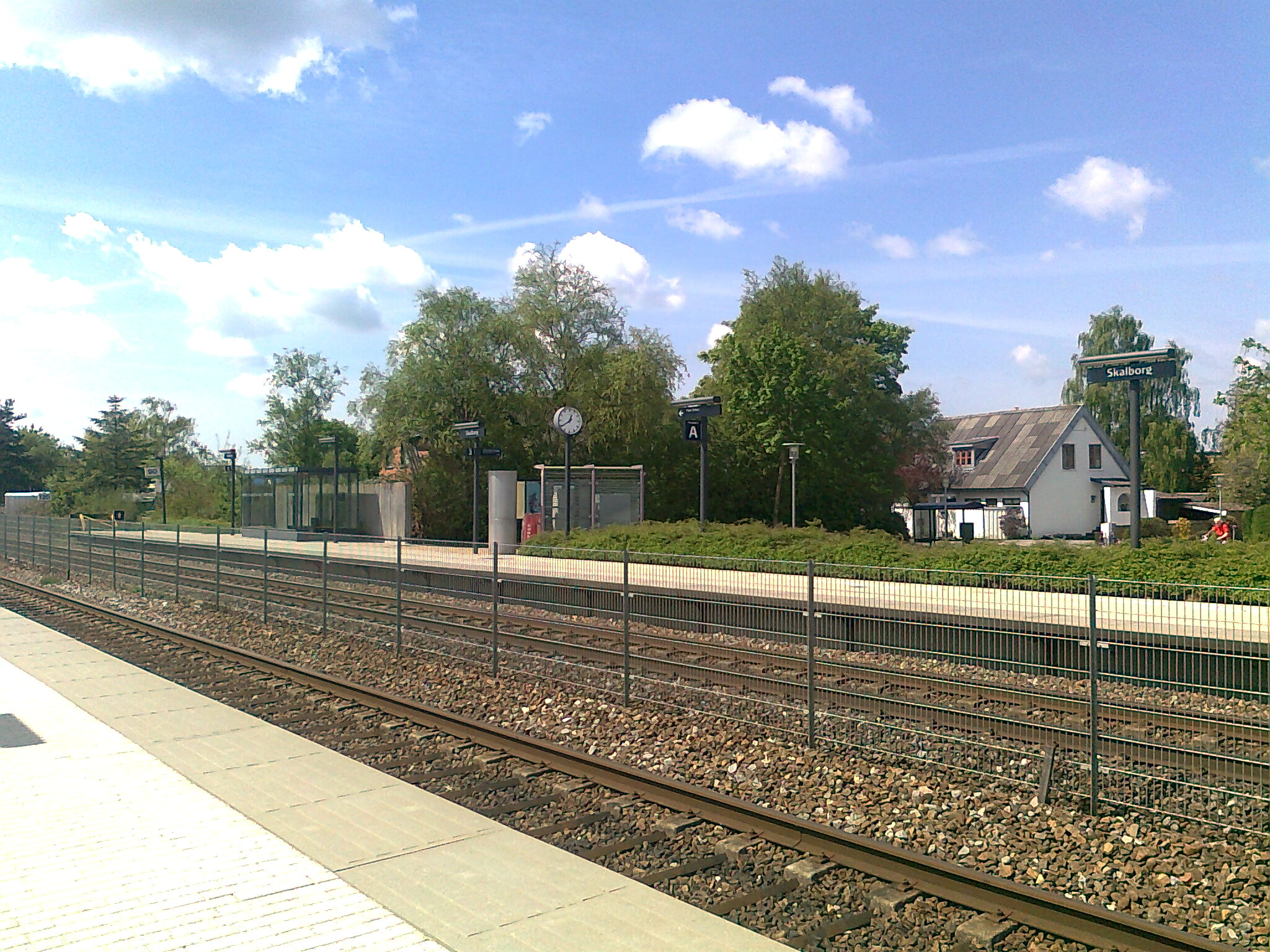
- Skalborg station in 2010

General information
- Location: Stationsmestervej; 9200 Aalborg SV; Aalborg Municipality; Denmark
- Coordinates: 57°0′29″N 9°53′53″E
- Elevation: 5.6 metres (18 ft)
- Owner: Banedanmark
- Line: Randers–Aalborg railway line
- Platforms: 2 side platforms
- Tracks: 2
- Train operators: Nordjyske Jernbaner

History
- Opened: 1899–1900, 2003
- Closed: 1972

Services
Preceding station	Nordjyske Jernbaner	Following station
Svenstrup towards Hobro	Hobro – Skagen Regional train	Aalborg towards Skagen
Svenstrup towards Skørping	Skørping – Hirtshals Regional train Peak hours	Aalborg towards Hirtshals
Location

Skalborg railway station is a railway station serving the district of Skalborg in the southern part of the city of Aalborg, Denmark.

The station is located on the Randers–Aalborg railway line between Randers and Aalborg. The station opened in 1899–1900, closed in 1972, and reopened in 2003. The train services are currently operated by the railway company Nordjyske Jernbaner.

== History ==
The original station opened in 1899–1900. The station was opened to allow for trains travelling in opposite directions on the then single track railway line to pass each other by means of a passing loop. The passing loop was made longer with the opening of the Aars-Nibe-Svendstrup railway line in 1899, which used the tracks of the Randers–Aalborg line between Svenstrup station and Aalborg station from 1902. The Aars-Nibe-Svendstrup railway line was extended to Hvalpsund in 1910. The line northwards to Aalborg was doubled on 17 September 1940 and the line southwards to Svendstrup was doubled on 10 December 1940.

The Aalborg–Hvalpsund railway line was closed in 1969. The station itself closed to passengers in 1972 during a series of station closures in the 1970s. However, the station reopened in 2003 as a part of the new Aalborg Commuter Rail service. In 2017, operation of the commuter rail services to Aalborg and Skørping were transferred from DSB to the regional railway company Nordjyske Jernbaner.

== Operations ==
The train services at the station are operated by the regional railway company Nordjyske Jernbaner which operates in the North Jutland Region. The station offers direct regional train services to Hobro, Skørping, Aalborg, Hirtshals and Skagen.

== See also ==
- List of railway stations in Denmark
- Rail transport in Denmark
- History of rail transport in Denmark
