= Tolne =

Village in North Jutland, Denmark

Coordinates: 57°29′9″N 10°18′45″E

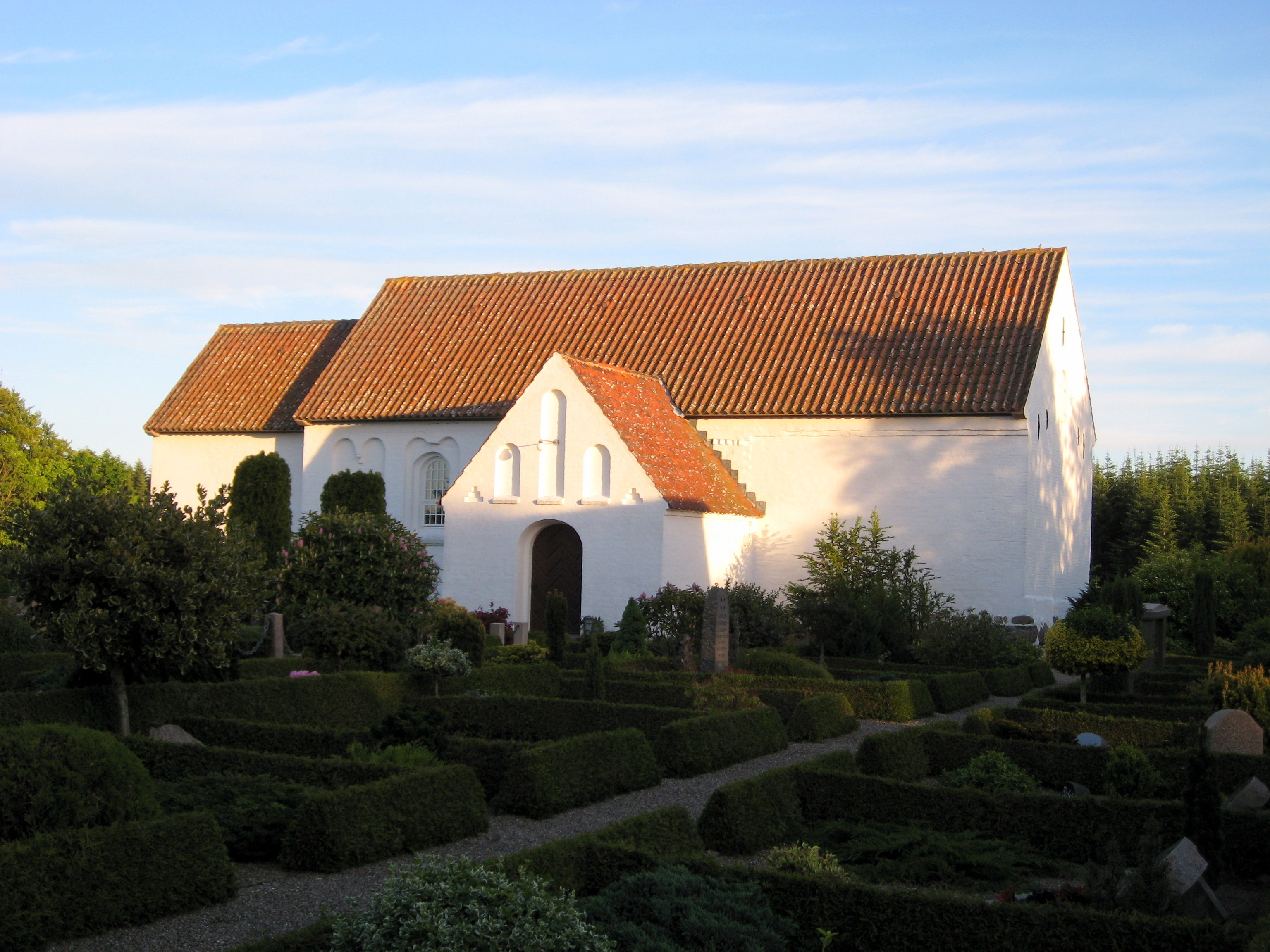
Tolne Church.

Tolne is a small village and railway town in Vendsyssel, Denmark. It is located in Hjørring Municipality in Region North Denmark. Its population was 209 as of 2015. It is located in Tolne Hills, a popular excursion trip destination.

Tolne is served by Tolne railway station, located on the Vendsyssel railway line between Aalborg and Frederikshavn.
