= Hjørring East railway halt =

Railway halt in North Jutland, Denmark

Hjørring Øst
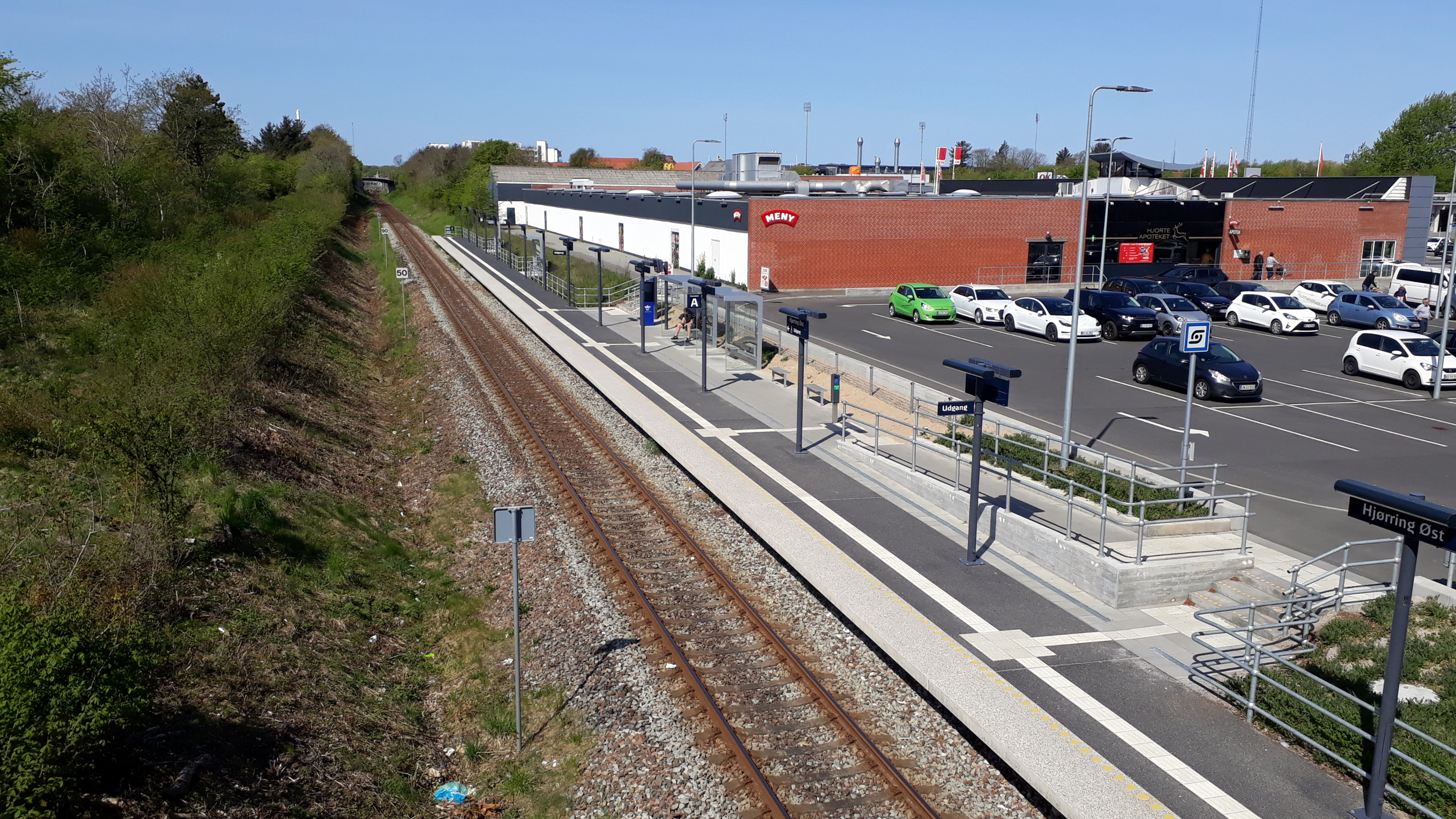
- Hjørring East railway halt in May 2022

General information
- Location: Hjørring; Hjørring Municipality; Denmark
- Coordinates: 57°27′17.5″N 10°00′20.8″E
- Elevation: 34.1 metres (112 ft)
- Owner: Banedanmark
- Line: Vendsyssel Line
- Platforms: 1
- Tracks: 1
- Train operators: Nordjyske Jernbaner

History
- Opened: 8 March 2021

Services
Preceding station	Nordjyske Jernbaner	Following station
Hjørring towards Hobro	Hobro – Skagen Regional train	Sindal towards Skagen
Hjørring Terminus	Hjørring – Skagen Local train Peak hours	Sindal towards Skagen
Location
- Location within Denmark

Hjørring East railway halt (Danish: Hjørring Øst Station) is a railway halt located in the eastern part of the city of Hjørring in Vendsyssel, Denmark. The halt serves the area's many educational institutions as well as the nearby hospital.

The halt is located on the Vendsyssel Line from Aalborg to Frederikshavn, between Hjørring and Sindal stations. It opened on 8 March 2021. The train services are operated by the railway company Nordjyske Jernbaner which runs frequent regional train services to Aalborg and Frederikshavn.

== See also ==
- List of railway stations in Denmark
