= Svenstrup railway station =

Railway station in North Jutland, Denmark

Svenstrup
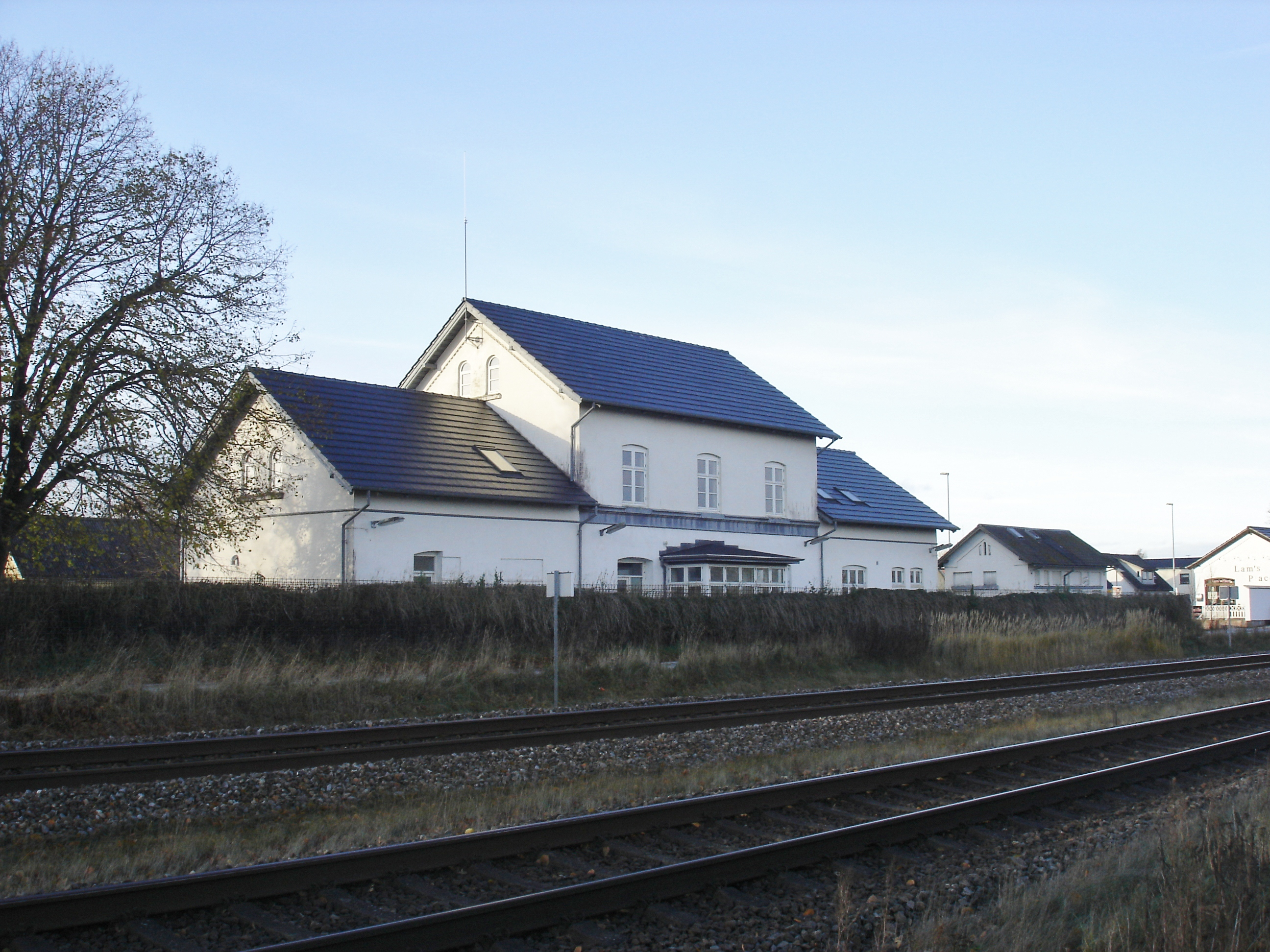
- Svenstrup station in 2013

General information
- Location: Svenstrup Banevej; 9230 Svenstrup J Aalborg Municipality; Denmark
- Coordinates: 56°58′19″N 9°51′22″E
- Elevation: 10.3 metres (34 ft)
- Owner: DSB (station infrastructure); Banedanmark (rail infrastructure)
- Lines: Randers–Aalborg (since 1872); Aalborg–Hvalpsund (1899–1969)
- Platforms: 2
- Tracks: 2
- Train operators: Nordjyske Jernbaner

History
- Opened: 1872, 2003
- Closed: 1972

Services
Preceding station	Nordjyske Jernbaner	Following station
Støvring towards Hobro	Hobro – Skagen Regional train	Skalborg towards Skagen
Støvring towards Skørping	Skørping – Hirtshals Regional train Peak hours	Skalborg towards Hirtshals
Location

Svenstrup railway station is a railway station serving the railway town of Svenstrup in Himmerland south of Aalborg, Denmark.

Svenstrup station is located on the Randers–Aalborg railway line between Randers and Aalborg. It opened in 1872, closed in 1972, and reopened in 2003. The train services are currently operated by the railway company Nordjyske Jernbaner.

== History ==
The original station opened in 1872. In 1899, Svendstrup Station also became the terminus of the new Aars–Nibe–Svendstrup railway line. From 1902, however, all trains on the Aars–Nibe–Svenstrup railway line were continued from Svenstrup to Aalborg station using the tracks of the Randers–Aalborg line. The Aars–Nibe–Svenstrup line was extended to Hvalpsund in 1910. The Aalborg-Hvalpsund Line was closed in 1969. Svendstrup station was closed in 1972 during a series of station closures in the 1970s. However, it reopened in 2003 as a part of the new Aalborg Commuter Rail service.

== Operations ==
The train services at the station are currently operated by the regional railway company Nordjyske Jernbaner. The station offers direct regional train services to Hobro, Skørping and Aalborg.

== See also ==
- List of railway stations in Denmark
- Rail transport in Denmark
