= Kvissel =

Village in Denmark

- Railway town
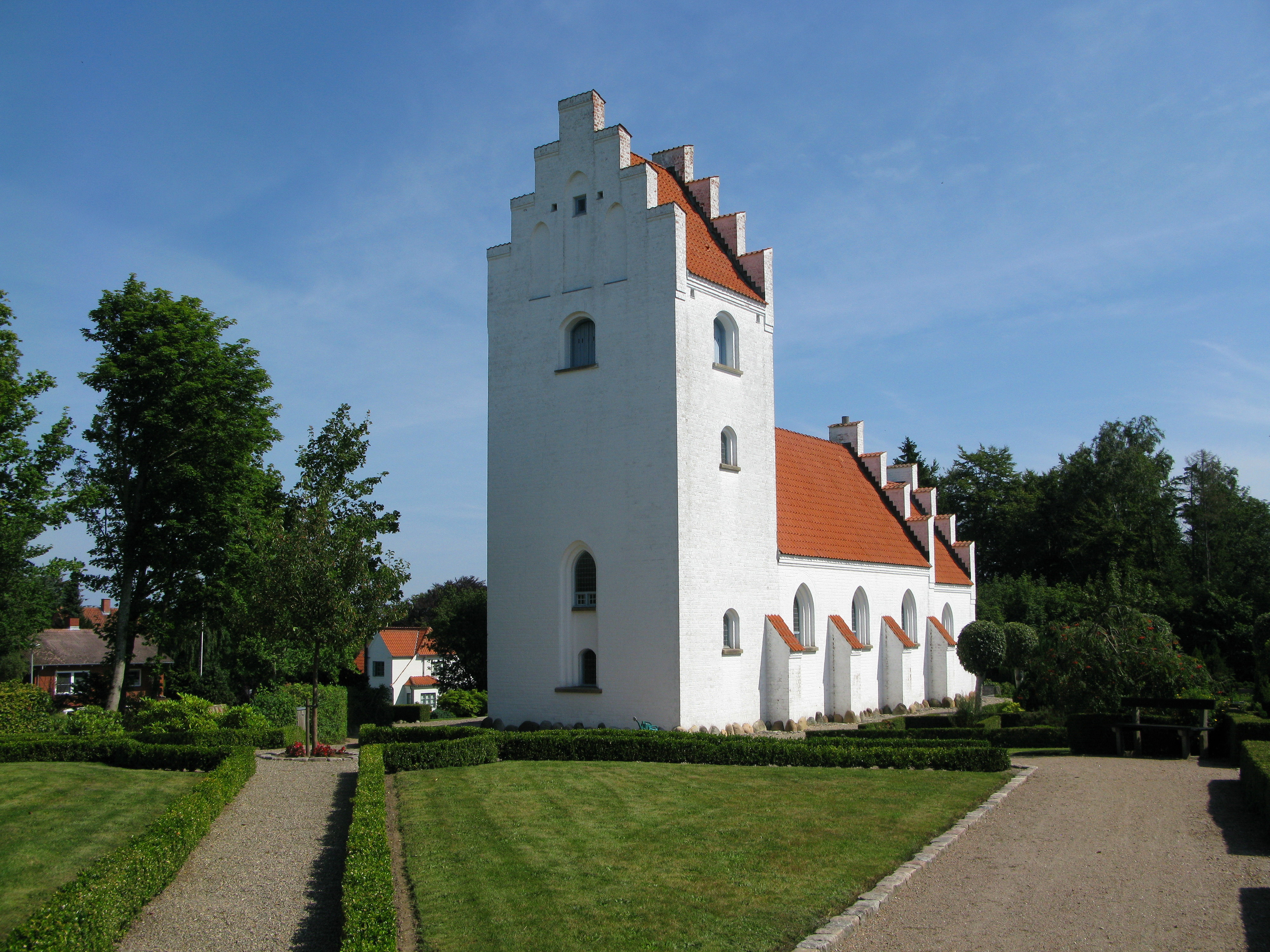
- Kvissel Church

- Location in Denmark Kvissel (North Jutland Region)
- Country: Denmark
- Region: Region Nordjylland
- Municipality: Frederikshavn
- Parish: Kvissel

Population (2026)
  - Urban: 347
- Time zone: UTC+1 (CET)
  - Summer (DST): UTC+2 (CEST)
- Postal code: DK-9900 Frederikshavn

Kvissel is a small village and railway town in Vendsyssel, Denmark. It is located in the Frederikshavn Municipality, about 10 km northwest of Frederikshavn, in Region Nordjylland. It has population of 347 inhabitants (as of 1 January 2026).

Kvissel Church is located in the centre of the town. The church was built in 1918–1919 and was inaugurated on 23 November 1919.

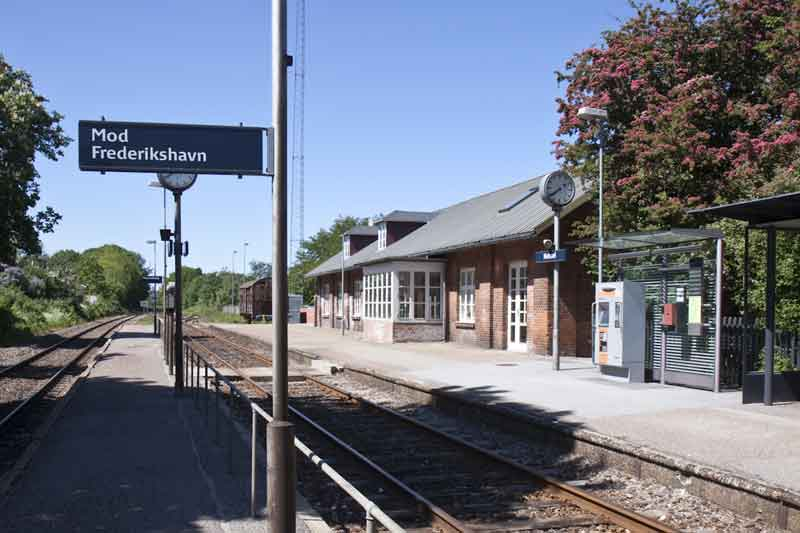
Kvissel railway station

Kvissel is served by Kvissel railway station, located on the Vendsyssel railway line.

== History ==
In 1683 the village consisted of twelve farms and five other houses.

The opening of the Vendsyssel railway line would become the major growth factor for Kvissel. When the station on the line opened in 1877, it brought economic growth to the village. In 1900 a school was opened, and in 1918–1919 a church was built.

Today, the town functions as a satellite town of Frederikshavn which can be reached by regional train in a few minutes.

== See also ==
- Kvissel murder
