= Sindal Airport =

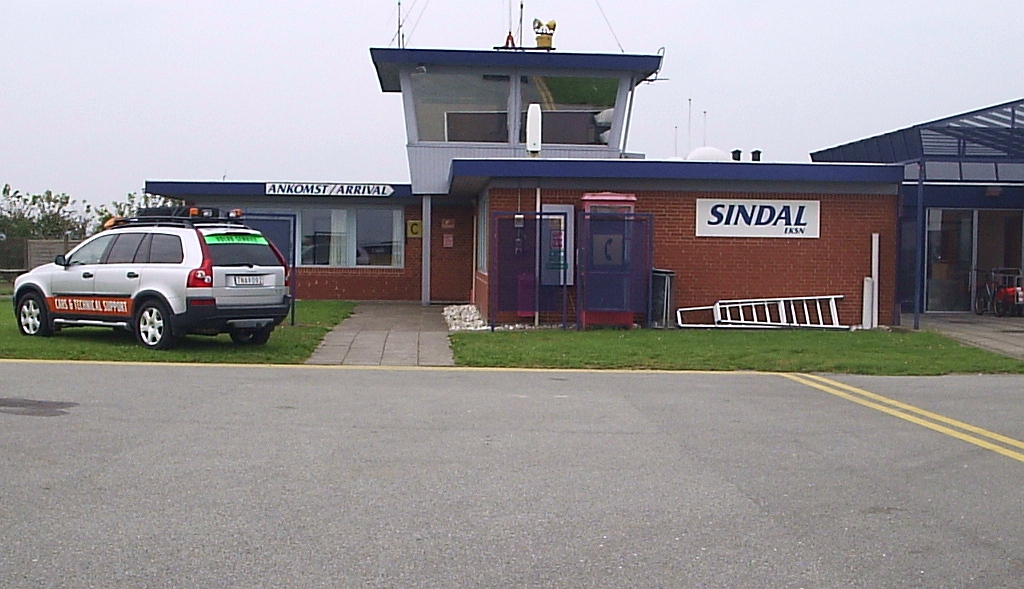
- IATA: CNL; ICAO: EKSN

Summary
- Location: Sindal, Denmark
- Elevation AMSL: 92 ft / 28 m
- Coordinates: 57°30′17″N 10°13′36″E
- Interactive map of Sindal Airport

Runways
Direction	Length		Surface
Direction	ft	m	Surface
08/26	3,933	1,199	Asphalt

Sindal Airport is an airfield in Sindal, Denmark. It was established in 1976 by the now Hjørring and Frederickshavn municipalities, though Frederickshavn Municipality withdrew from co-ownership in 2012. The airport is equipped with a 1199 meter long Asphalt Runway. The airport is site to a Sun-Air Maintenance base and the Sindal Air Club. It was downgraded from airport to airfield status in 2022.
