= Kvissel murder =

Infamous murder in Denmark

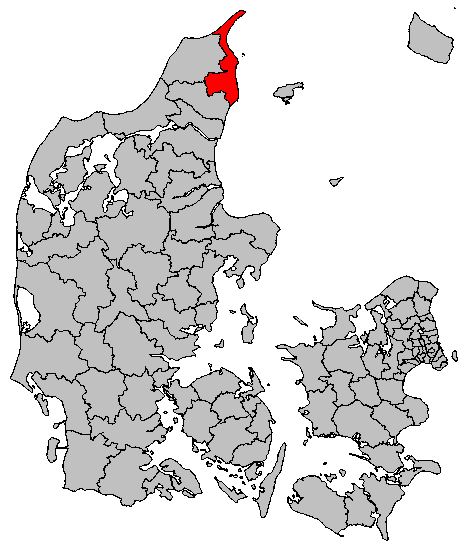
Kvissel is located in Frederikshavn Municipality, highlighted in red within Denmark

On 8 October 2014 in the Danish village of Kvissel, 40-year-old Tine Rømer Holtegaard was fatally stabbed in her sleep. On 14 September 2015, her 16-year-old daughter Lisa Borch was sentenced to nine years' imprisonment for her mother's murder. Borch's boyfriend, 29-year-old Bakhtiar Mohammed Abdullah, was sentenced to 13 years in prison, followed by deportation. The murder received international coverage, with sources highlighting Borch's viewing of videos of Islamic State of Iraq and the Levant executions immediately prior to the murder.

== Background ==
Kvissel, which had a population of 412 in 2014, is a village of Frederikshavn Municipality, the most northerly Danish municipalities. Borch lived there with her mother, her stepfather Jens Holtegaard, and a twin sister. She had reportedly been in a relationship with an Islamic extremist, who ended it to return to his family in Sweden. Following this, she met Abdullah, originally from Iraq, at a nearby refugee centre. Jens Holtegaard stated that Borch was "completely uncritically enthusiastic" about migrants and the Islamic State of Iraq and the Levant. She feuded with her parents over her relationship with Abdullah, leading her twin to leave home for a period. Lisa Borch showed a knife to her sister and claimed that she would murder their mother, a threat which was not taken seriously.

== Attack and arrest ==
Tine Rømer Holtegaard was asleep, having taken sleeping pills, when she was stabbed at least 20 times in the chest by Borch and her boyfriend.

Borch, who according to computer records had been watching ISIL execution videos including those of David Haines and Alan Henning, contacted the police, claiming that her mother had screamed and she had seen a "white man" running away from their home. She was indifferent when the police informed her that her mother had been killed. Abdullah was not present when the police arrived, but was arrested on the strength of forensic evidence.

== Trial and conviction ==
Borch and Abdullah were tried in court in Hjørring. The prosecution argued that the aggravating factors were the brutality of the murder's planning and execution, Rømer Holtegaard having taken sleeping pills, and the crime having taken place in the victim's home. They also claimed that the pair were intending to fight in the Syrian Civil War. The defence said that Borch's sentence should be mitigated by her youth, and her being under the bad influence of others. The court could not prove which of the pair carried out the stabbing; both Borch and Abdullah were found guilty of murder. Borch's sentence was suggested by the prosecution, and was made possible because of a 2010 amendment to the law which scrapped a previous maximum eight-year sentence for criminals under 18; she was ordered to serve the first year in juvenile detention and the remaining eight in prison.

Her stepfather told Danish newspaper BT that he disagreed with the court psychologists' conclusion that Borch's psychology showed psychopathic elements, claiming that she changed radically after meeting Abdullah. He also expressed fears that she would become further radicalised in prison. In an interview with Se og Hør, he confessed that he felt as fragile as a "Chinese porcelain doll" after the murder of his partner of eleven years, sleeping upwards of 14 hours a day and being prescribed anti-anxiety medication.
