= Martinus Thomsen =

Danish mystic (1890–1981)

- Born: 11 August 1890; Sindal, Denmark
- Died: 8 March 1981 (aged 90); Frederiksberg, Denmark
- Occupations: Author and mystic
- Known for: The Third Testament
- Website: http://www.martinus.dk/en/frontpage

Martinus Thomsen, referred to as Martinus, (11 August 1890 – 8 March 1981) was a Danish author. Born into a poor family and with a limited education, Martinus claimed to have had a profound spiritual experience in March 1921. This experience, which he called "cosmic consciousness", would be the inspiration for the books he wrote later which are collectively entitled The Third Testament. Some of his works have been translated into twenty languages, and while he is not well known internationally, his work remains popular in Denmark and in other parts of Scandinavia.

== Early life ==
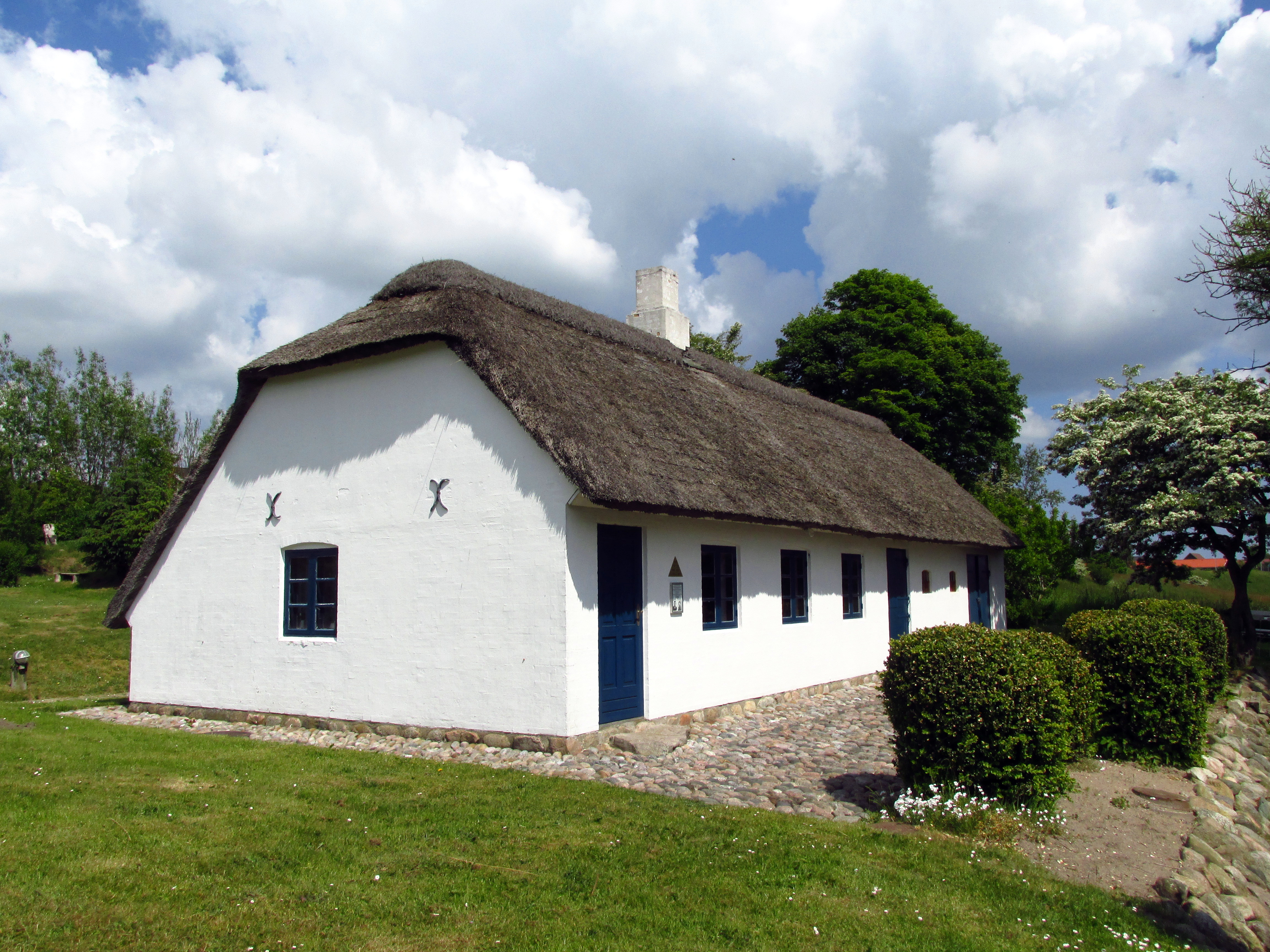
Martinus' childhood home in Sindal, Denmark, today a museum

Born on 11 August 1890 near Sindal, a small town in northern Jutland, Denmark, Thomsen grew up in a house called "Moskildvad". This house, now open to the public, is testimony to the poverty he experienced during childhood. An illegitimate child, Thomsen never knew his father. His mother never married and worked on a farm called Kristiansminde. There, a stableman by the name of Thomsen was named his father and therefore he was named Martinus Thomsen. He did state that he suspected the proprietor of the farm to be his real father.

His mother was unable to care for him as a young child and as a result, he was taken in by her brother and his wife. They were an elderly couple who had already raised eleven children of their own but despite this, Thomsen always referred to them fondly. He mentioned that despite their meager circumstances, they always made him feel secure. His mother died when he was just eleven and for the most part, his contact with her was very limited.

His education at the local village school was very basic, focusing mainly on verses of hymns, geography, Danish and natural history, arithmetic and the catechism. He spent six hours per week in class in the summer and thirty hours per week in the winter. His foster family could not afford books and Thomsen has stated he inherited old copies of Familie Journalen (The Family Journal), which became the basis of his reading material.

At the age of sixteen Thomsen became a dairyman, working around various parts of Denmark, he later worked as a watchman, and in 1920 he was an office clerk in at the dairy company Enigheden in Copenhagen.

== Religious experiences at the age of 30 and subsequent history ==
According to Martinus, during March 1921 a decisive transformation took place in his life, in that he had strong spiritual experiences that led to a profound expansion of his consciousness. Prior his revelation it is known that he moved in Theosophical circles. Biographical accounts are inconclusive about the Theosophical inspiration for Martinus' spiritual revelation. Martinus himself rejected any suggestion that his revelations were inspired by Theosophy.

His books On the Birth of My Mission and Intellectualized Christianity provide a description of these experiences. Martinus called the new state of consciousness which he attained at the age of 30 "cosmic consciousness". He considered the prerequisite for cosmic consciousness to be a highly developed faculty of intuition, which all human beings will develop sooner or later.

The cosmic baptism of fire through which I had passed – the closer analysis of which I cannot specify here – had thus left the fact that entirely new sensory abilities had been released in me, abilities that enabled me – not in glimpses – but on the contrary in a permanent state of awake day consciousness – to apprehend all the main spiritual forces, invisible causes, eternal world laws, basic energies and basic principles behind the physical world. The mystery of existence was therefore no longer a mystery to me. I had become conscious in the life of the whole universe, and had been initiated into 'the divine principle of creation'

— (Livets Bog 1, sect. 21)

After his experiences, he was first financially supported by his friend Lars Nibelvang (1879–1948), and later other friends, allowing Martinus to devote himself to his philosophy full time by the autumn of 1922. Martinus initially found it difficult to express his ideas in writing, drawing symbols instead. It was not until 1928 that he began to compose his major work, the Livets Bog (The Book of Life), which was published in 1932. After his initial experiences, he began doing audiences with small numbers of people, and by 1930 he had begun to lecture to larger audiences. The magazine Kosmos, dedicated to Martinus' thought, was first published in 1933. In 1935 the Martinus Centre (then named the Kosmos Camp) in Klint, Zealand was inaugurated.

== Ideas and works ==
Martinus' works are collectively entitled The Third Testament. His 7-volume main work is Livets Bog (The Book of Life). The Eternal World Picture, vols. 1–5, in which he explains the main principles in his world picture with the aid of coloured symbols and explanatory texts, supplement his main work. His other books include Logic, Bisættelse (On Funerals), Intellectualised Christianity and 28 shorter works; he has also written a substantial number of articles.

Martinus considered himself a religious messenger, along the lines of the Buddha, Mohammed, and Jesus, and that he had a pivotal role to spread his message of the world's redemption through wisdom and love. According to Helle Bertelsen, Martinus preached that "God's spirit or consciousness flows through the entire universe by means of various impulses or streams of energy. This means that all living creatures are embarked on an endless journey in the divine consciousness, and that this unitary consciousness moves forward in an upward spiral movement, thus constituting a progressive evolution of consciousness." Martinus considered that "primitive consciousness" and old religions were fading, to be replaced by a "paradigm shift" in which science will be fused with eastern mysticism. Martinus cosmology contains numerous elements of ultimately Indian origin, such as karma, reincarnation, energies, and levels of energy. According to Helle Bertelsen, these elements were "probably mediated by Theosophical, Anthroposophical, and other esoteric sources". According to Helle Bertelsen, Martinus desired that "his person or work should not be made into an object of any association, new religion, sect, or global organisation. He considered his work as a kind of school, college or institution for a science of life.", which contributes to his relative anonymity.

At present 19 of Martinus' books have been translated into English and some of Martinus' books have been translated into 20 other languages.

== Symbols ==
Martinus drew and painted a large number of symbols, figures, colours and lines, each illustrating specific areas of the cosmic analyses which he claimed are important elements in his overall description of the eternal world picture. In his opinion these symbols provide an accessible overview of the principles and laws that characterize life and the universe as a whole.

Forty-four symbols with associated symbol explanations are published in his books The Eternal World Picture 1–5; a supplement to his main work, Livets Bog (The Book of Life). Martinus left a number of additional symbols, which the Martinus Institute expects to publish in later volumes of The Eternal World Picture.

== Death and funeral ==
Martinus lived in a small apartment on the first floor of the Martinus Institute until he died on 8 March 1981 at the age of 90. His funeral was attended by 1,400 people and he was buried in Frederiksberg Ældre Kirkegård, Copenhagen.

== Reception ==
Martinus has generally been considered part of the tradition of western esotericism. Henrik Bogdan & Olav Hammer described Martinus as "The most influential Scandinavian esotericist after Swedenborg". Due to the lack of formal organisation, it is difficult to know how many followers Martinus had in his lifetime, though it is known that 400 people attended his 70th birthday celebration, and 1,200 were present at his 90th. According to a 2005 report in the Danish newspaper Kristeligt Dagblad, around 2,000 people in Denmark participated in study groups based on the work of Martinus, up from around 1,200 ten years prior.

== Bibliography ==
Martinus published many books and pamphlets, many of which have been translated.

- The Third Testament – Livets Bog (The Book of Life), volume 1 – 292 pages – ISBN 87-575-0601-9
- The Third Testament – Livets Bog (The Book of Life), volume 2 – 304 pages – ISBN 87-575-0602-7
- The Third Testament – Livets Bog (The Book of Life), volume 4 – 504 pages – ISBN 978-87-575-0604-4
- The Eternal World Picture 1 – 119 pages – ISBN 87-575-0781-3
- The Eternal World Picture 2 – 150 pages – ISBN 87-575-0782-1
- The Eternal World Picture 3 – 154 pages – ISBN 87-575-0784-8
- The Eternal World Picture 4 – 155 pages – ISBN 87-575-0786-4
- Logic – 255 pages – ISBN 978-87-575-0779-9
- All Martinus' publications can be read (in English and many other languages) on the website of the Martinus Institute: http://www.martinus.dk/en/ttt/

== Shorter works ==
- Marriage and Universal Love – 32 pages
- Meditation – 44 pages – ISBN 87-575-0720-1
- The Fate of Mankind – 42 pages – ISBN 87-575-0701-5
- The Ideal Food – 99 pages – ISBN 87-575-0736-8
- The Immortality of Living Beings – 89 pages – ISBN 87-575-0723-6
- The Mystery of Prayer – 111 pages – ISBN 87-575-0711-2
- The Principle of Reincarnation – 76 pages – ISBN 87-575-0729-5
- The Road to Initiation – 156 pages –
- The Road of Life – 111 pages – ISBN 87-575-0722-8
- World Religion and World Politics – 82 pages – ISBN 87-575-0717-1
