= Martin Mortensen (academic) =

- Born: May 29, 1872; North Jutlandic Island, Denmark
- Died: March 12, 1953 (aged 80); Houston, Texas, U.S.
- Children: 2

Academic background
- Education: Iowa State College (BA); Kansas State College (LLD)

Academic work
- Discipline: Agriculture
- Sub-discipline: Dairy studies
- Institutions: Iowa State College

Martin Mortensen (May 29, 1872 – March 12, 1953) was a Danish-born American professor who headed of the Department of Dairy Industry at Iowa State College in Ames, Iowa.

== Early life and education ==
Martin Mortensen was born on North Jutlandic Island in Sindal, Denmark. He was the son of Peder Christian Mortensen (1821–1902) and Juliane Marie (née Larsen) Mortensen (1827–1904). He completed a three-year course at the Royal Teachers Seminary and then emigrated to the United States in 1893. After working in and managing dairies in the Midwest and on the Pacific Coast, he received a Bachelor of Arts degree in agriculture at Iowa State College (1908) and a LLD (1934) from Kansas State College.

== Career ==
Mortensen became head of the Dairy Industry Department at Iowa State College in 1909 until 1938, and remained as a professor until 1953. He authored text books and also bulletins on dairy research. He was the past president, vice-president and secretary-treasurer of the American Dairy Science Association.

== Personal life ==
He married Amelia Christensen (1878–1945) of Royal, Iowa, and had two children. In 1927, he was made a knight of the Order of the Dannebrog and in 1950 received the Commander's Cross of the Order of Dannebrog.

== Selected works ==
- Management of Dairy Plants (Macmillan; 1921)
