= Sindal =

- Town
- Sindal
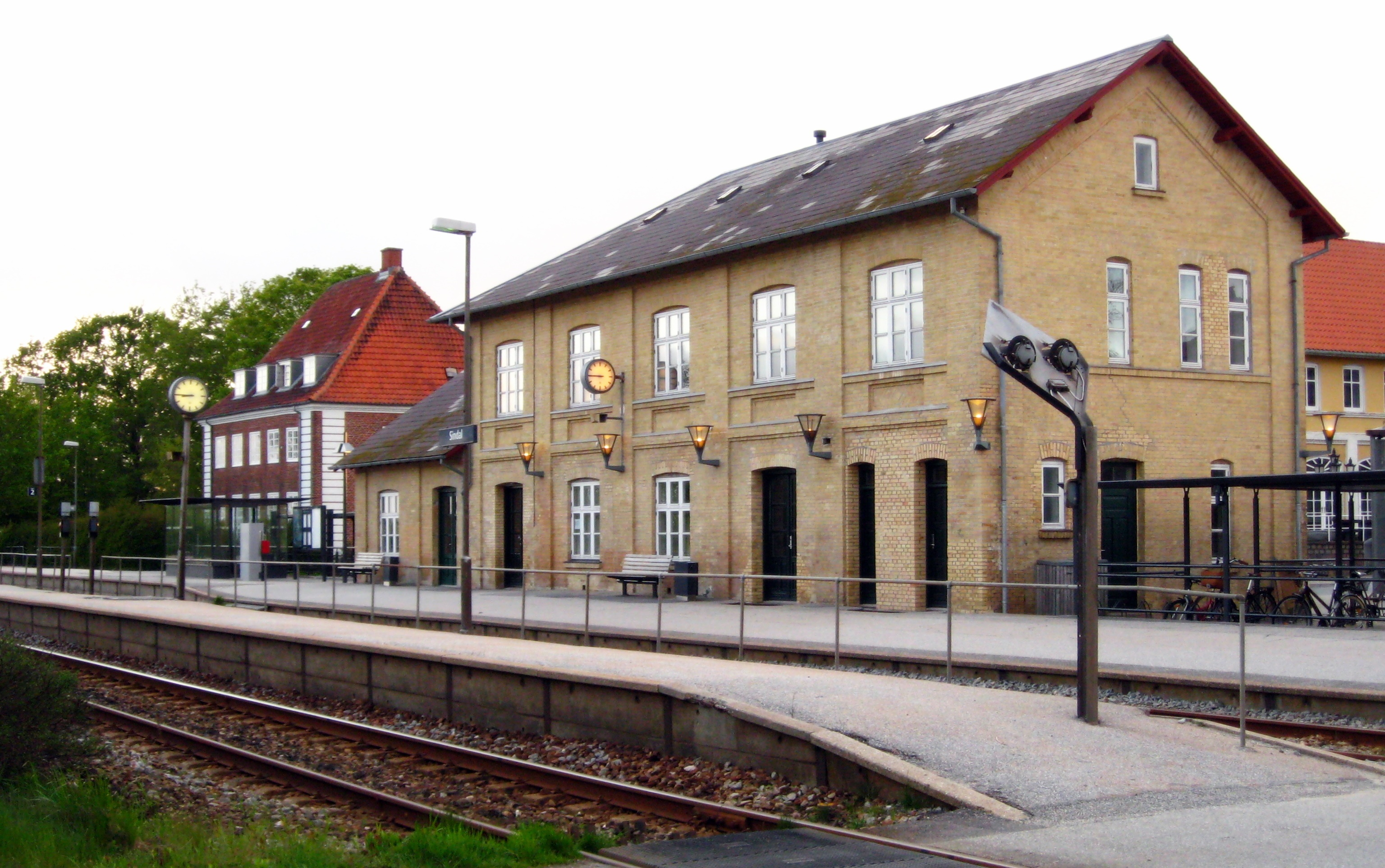
- Sindal railway station

- Location in Denmark Sindal (North Jutland Region)
- Coordinates: 57°28′28″N 10°12′8″E
- Country: Denmark
- Region: North Jutland Region
- Municipality: Hjørring Municipality

Area
  - Urban: 2.9 km^{2} (1.1 sq mi)

Population (2026)
  - Urban: 3,032
  - Urban density: 1,000/km^{2} (2,700/sq mi)
- Time zone: UTC+1 (CET)
  - Summer (DST): UTC+2 (CEST)
- Postal code: DK-9870 Sindal

Sindal is a railway town on the island of Vendsyssel-Thy at the top of the Jutland peninsula in northern Denmark. It has a population of 3,032 (1 January 2026) and is located in Hjørring Municipality in Region Nordjylland.

Until 1 January 2007 Sindal was also the seat of Sindal Municipality which was merged with existing Hjørring, Løkken-Vrå, and Hirtshals municipalities to form an enlarged Hjørring Municipality.

== History ==
The town was originally named Soldalen, meaning "Sun Valley". There is some dispute over when the city was officially founded; the earliest records of the city's existence date back to the 18th century, in which the city is described as "Sindal church near the town of Sindal with Housing for the priest, a railroad, and school". Much of the town's growth was a result the Sindal Station, which brought business to the area and was built in 1871.

The town's oldest commercial building is the Sindal mill. It had originally been built in the nearby village of Fjeldsted, but was moved to Sindal in 1872 after the railway station was opened. It remained operational as a grain mill until 1947, but after its closure fell into disrepair. Major restorations managed to save the windmill and today it remains the only fully preserved stone-walled mill in Vendsyssel.

In 1976, Sindal Airport opened. The Airport is property of Hjørring Municipality which oversees its operations.

== Religion ==
The town's original church, referred to as Old Sindal Church (Danish: Sindal Gamle Kirke), was first built in the 12th century. It has since been renovated and expanded several times. In 1910, Sindal City Church (Danish: Sindal Bykirke) was built to accommodate the expanding town. It was designed by Hother A. Paludan in the Neo-Romanesque style. Both congregations belong to the Church of Denmark and are part of the parish of Sindal Sogn within the Diocese of Aalborg. Sindal Baptist Church (Danish: Sindal Baptistkirke) was established in 1905 as a free church.

== Notable people ==
- Martin Mortensen (1872 in Sindal – 1953): an American Professor and Head of the Department of Dairy Industry at Iowa State College in Ames, Iowa; emigrated to the US in 1893.
- Martinus Thomsen (1890 near Sindal – 1981): a Danish author, philosopher and mystic.
- Jørgen Østergaard (1944 in Sindal): a Danish engineer and former rector at Aalborg University.
- Rune Kristensen (1986 in Sindal): a professional bicycle mechanic in the UCI World Tour famous for performing the first disc brake bike wheel change in professional cycling.
- Gulli Arason (1950 in Iceland): author and artist, settled in Sindal in 2019.

== Gallery ==
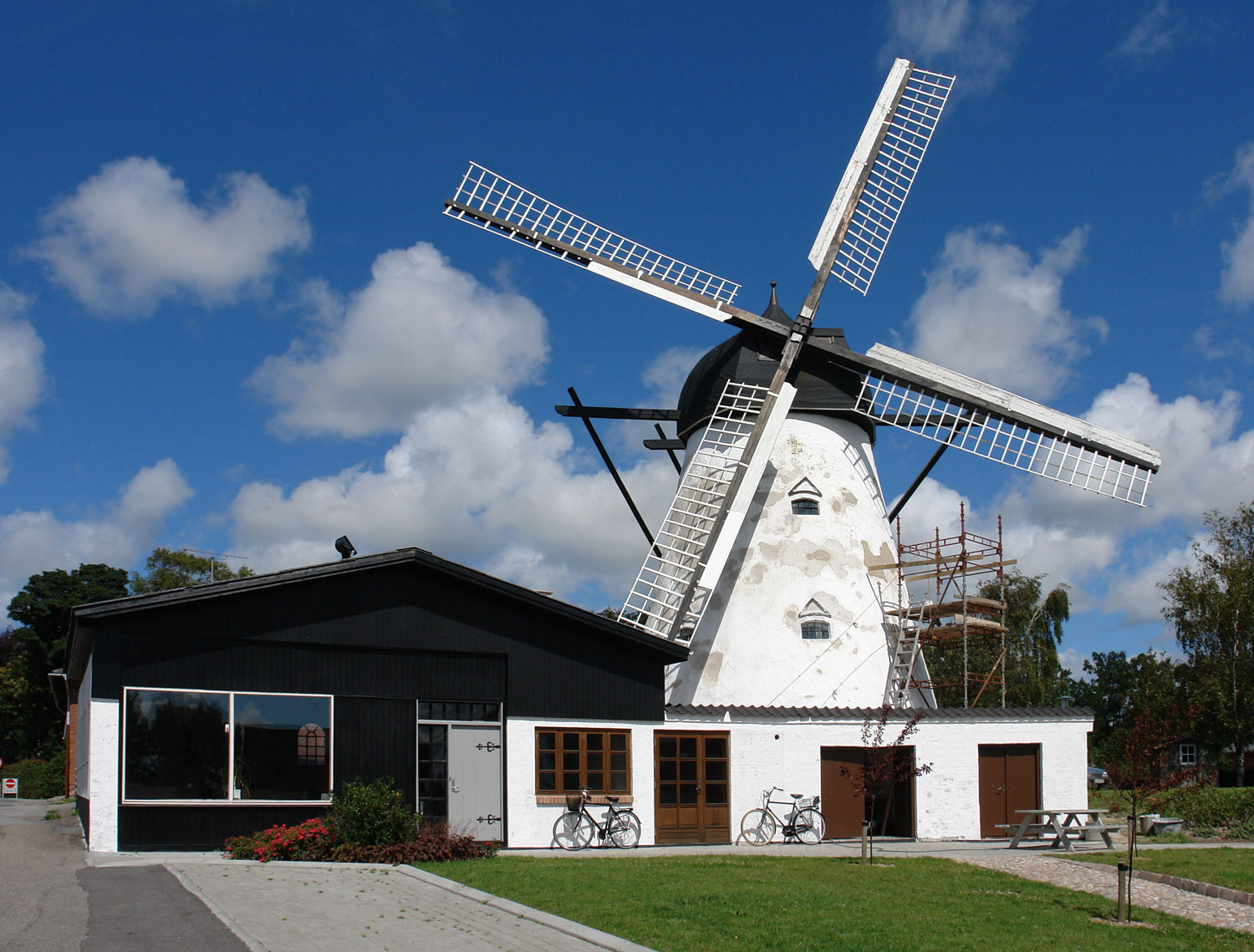
Sindal Windmill

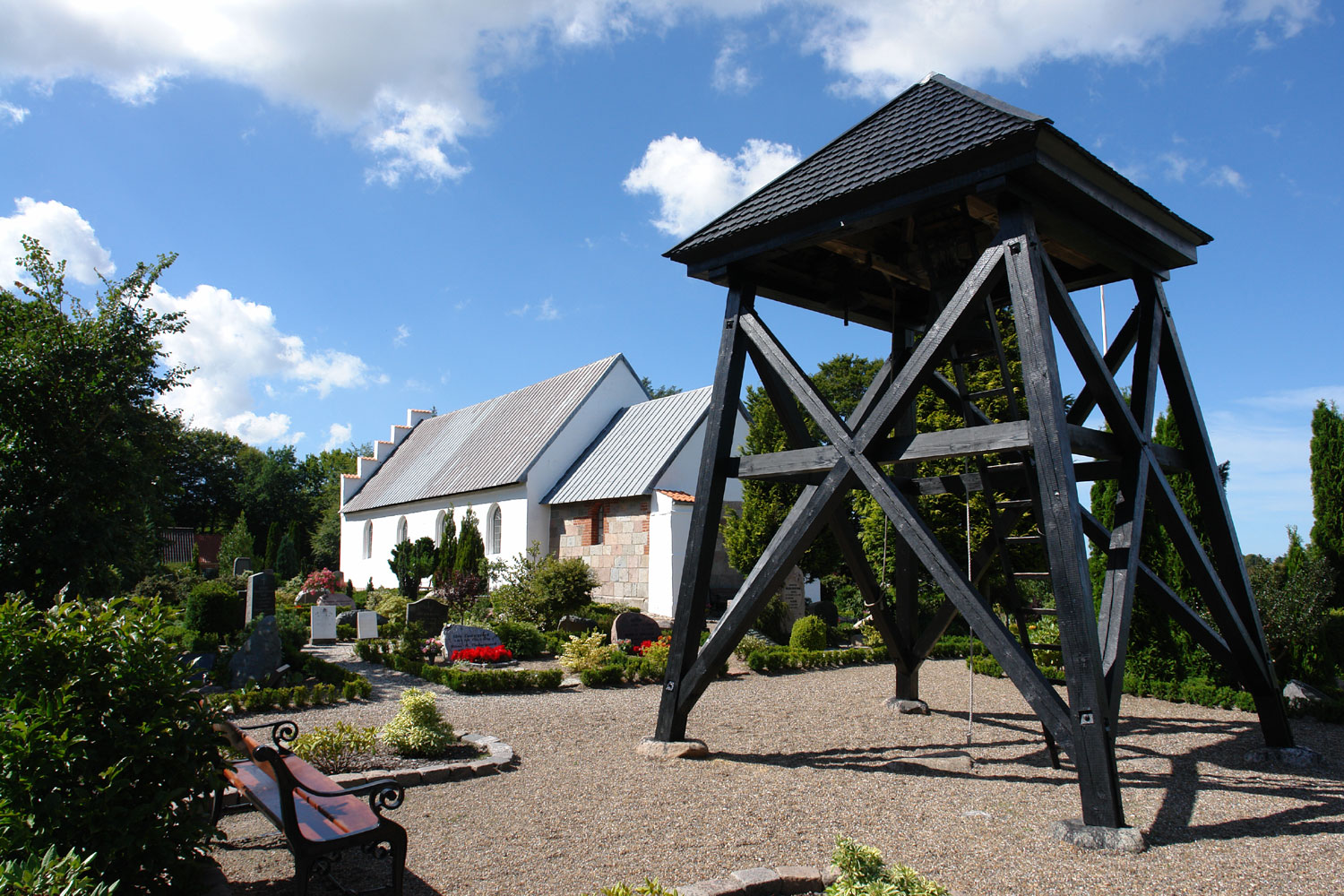
Old Sindal Church, 2008

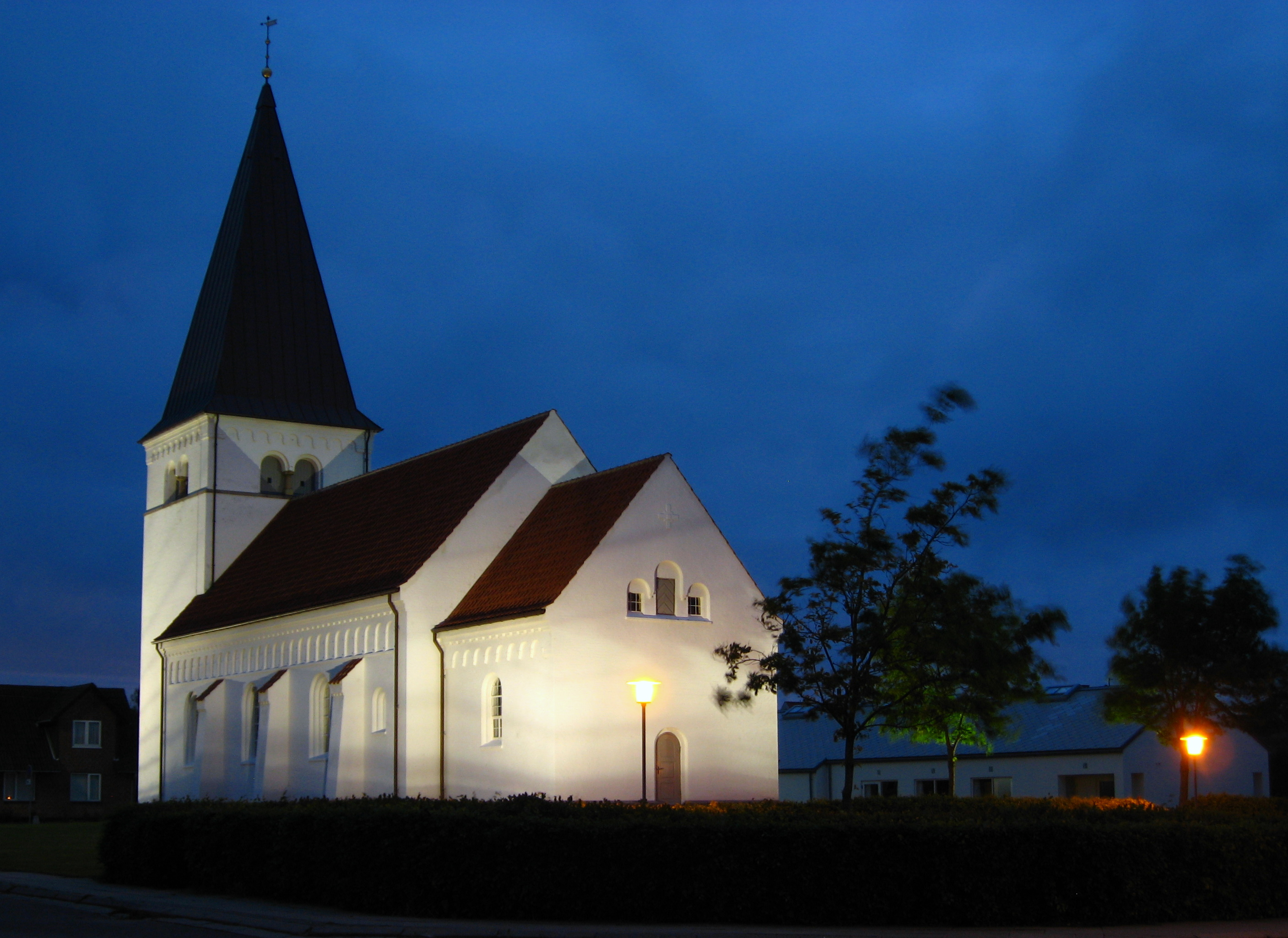
Sindal City Church
