= Jernbanebroen over Limfjorden =

Limfjord Railway Bridge Jernbanebroen over Limfjorden
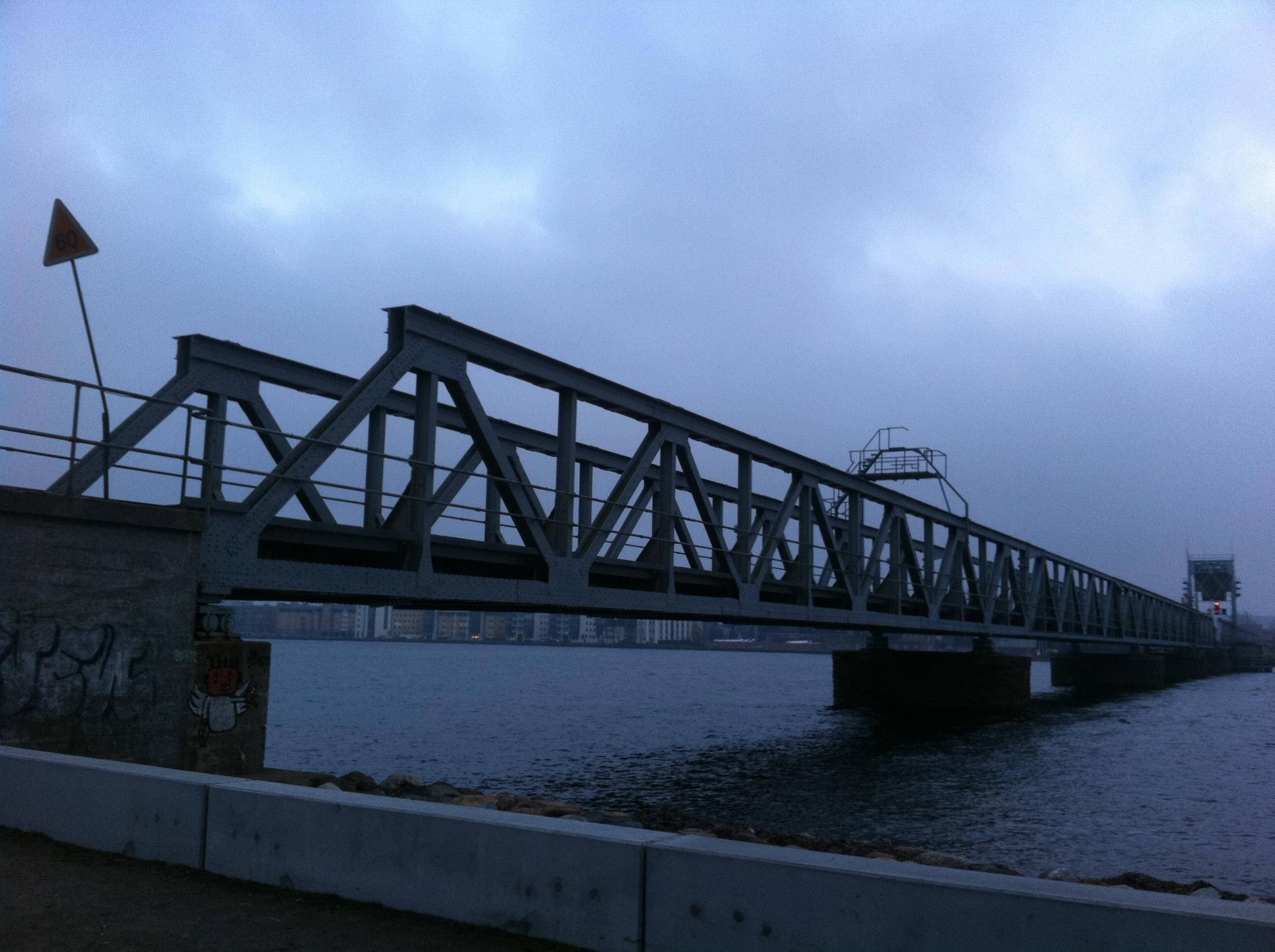
- The railway bridge across the Limfjord in 2011
- Coordinates: 57.058333°N 9.910556°E
- Carries: Vendsyssel railway line
- Crosses: The Limfjord
- Locale: North Jutland, Denmark
- Begins: Aalborg
- Ends: Nørresundby
- Owner: Banedanmark

Characteristics
- Design: Truss bascule bridge
- Material: Steel
- Total length: 403 metres (1,322 ft)
- Width: 5.7 metres (19 ft)
- No. of spans: 9
- Piers in water: 7

Rail characteristics
- No. of tracks: 1
- Track gauge: 1,435 mm (4 ft 8 1/2 in)

History
- Construction start: 1935
- Construction end: 1938
- Opened: 1938
- Inaugurated: 23 April 1938
- Replaces: Limfjord Railway Bridge (1879)

Location
- Interactive map of Limfjord Railway Bridge

The Limfjord Railway Bridge (Danish: Jernbanebroen over Limfjorden) is a railway bridge carrying the Vendsyssel railway line across the Limfjord, a shallow sound separating the North Jutlandic Island from the rest of the Jutland Peninsula, between Aalborg and Nørresundby in North Jutland, Denmark.

The current bridge was inaugurated in 1938 and replaced an earlier bridge from 1879. It has a length of 403 metres (1,322 ft) and is a bascule bridge of steel truss design with nine spans. The bridge carries a single railway track which has a maximum authorized speed of 60 kilometres per hour (37 mph).

== Name ==
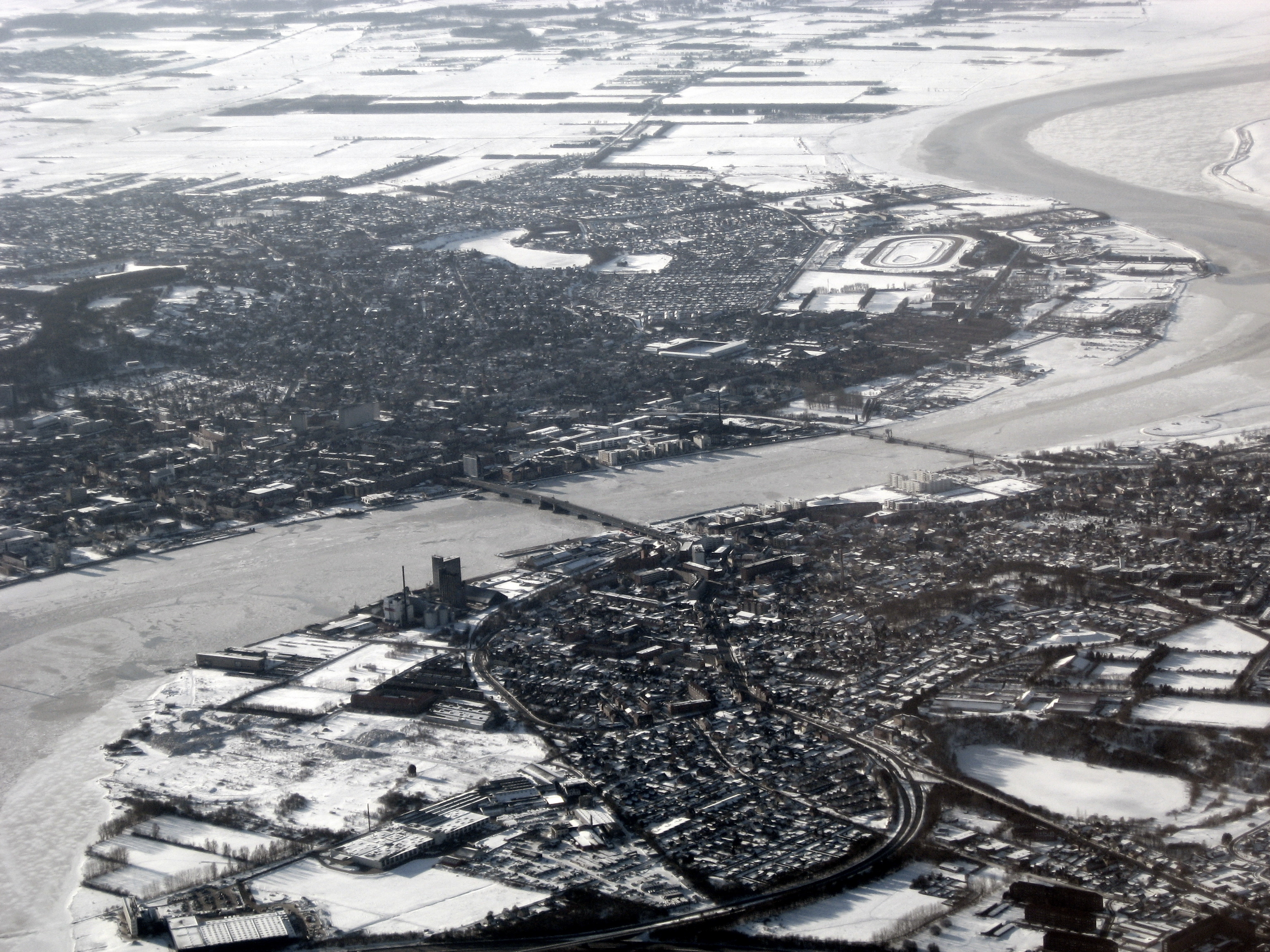
The two bridges across the Limfjord seen from the north, the road bridge to the left and the railway bridge to the right.

Since 2003, Jernbanebroen over Limfjorden (English: the Limfjord Railway Bridge) has been the official name for the railway bridge between Aalborg and Nørresundby, though colloquially it is simply called Jernbanebroen (English: the Railway Bridge). Formerly known as Limfjordsbroen (English: the Limfjord Bridge), there is a road bridge to the east of the railway bridge, Limfjordsbroen, of the same name.

== History ==
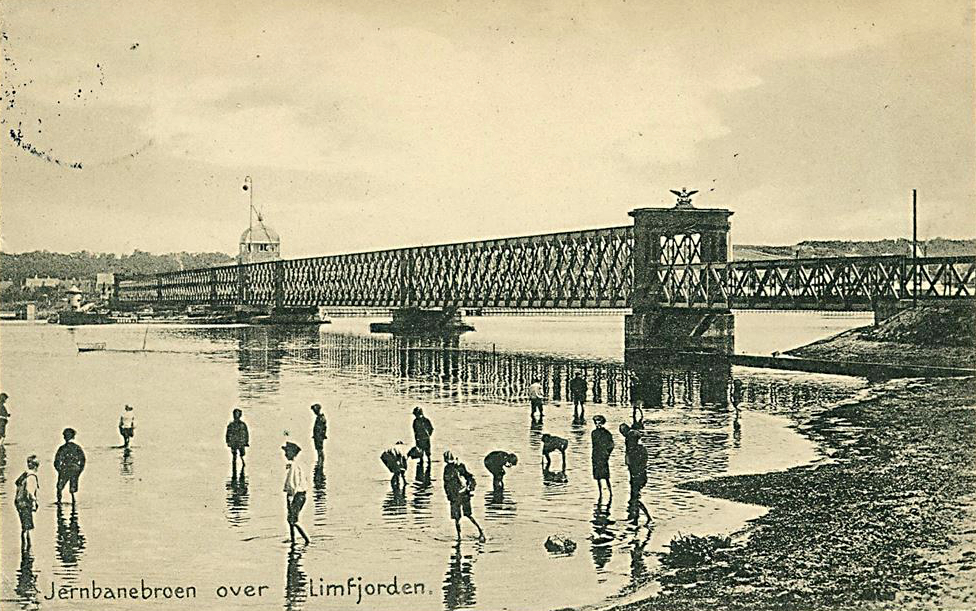
The earlier bridge from 1879.

The Vendsyssel railway line through the historical region of Vendsyssel from Frederikshavn to Nørresundby was opened in 1871. Passengers crossing the Limfjord between Nørresundby station and Aalborg station initially had two opportunities: a ferry or crossing the pontoon bridge located further east on foot.

However, in 1879 the first railway bridge spanning the Limfjord, the Limfjord Railway Bridge, was opened, and the Vendsyssel railway line was connected with Aalborg station, the Randers–Aalborg railway line as well as the rest of the Danish railway network.

The original railway bridge was replaced by the current Limfjord Railway Bridge which was inaugurated on 23 April 1938.

Until 1 January 1997, it belonged to the railway company DSB when DSB was split into DSB and Banedanmark. On 28 March 2012 the bridge was hit by a ship and damaged. The reason was a misunderstanding in the radio communication. The bridge was repaired and opened again for traffic on 29 April 2013.

== Features ==
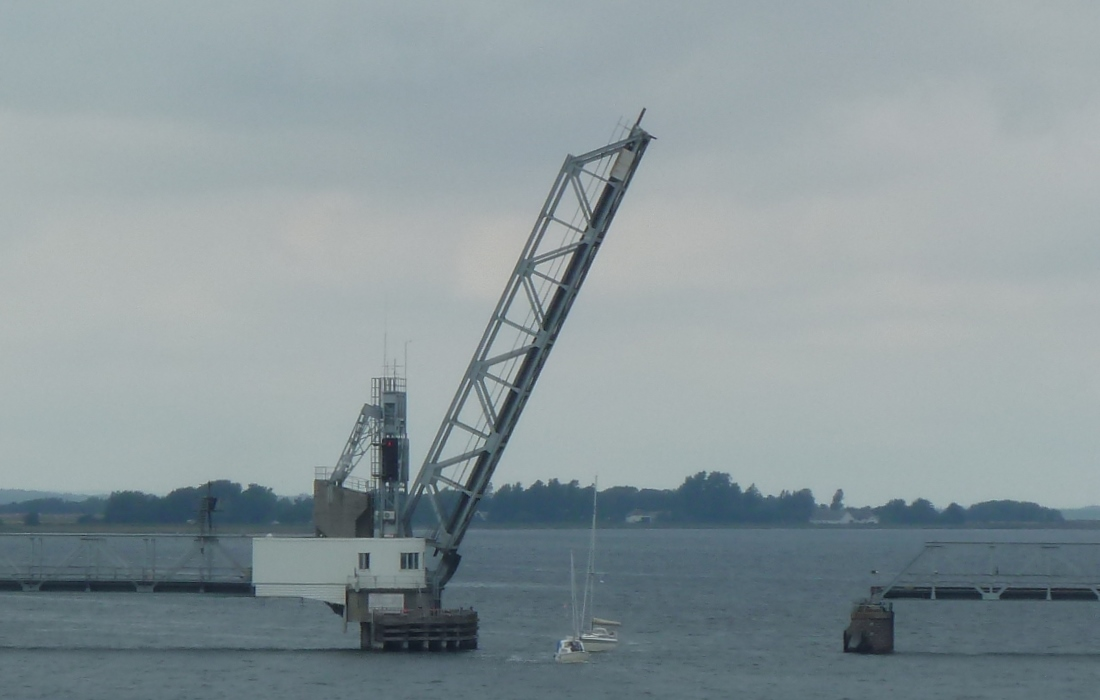
The open leaf of the bascule bridge.

The bridge is 403 metres (1,322 ft) long and has a width of 5.7 metres (19 ft). It is a steel truss bridge with nine spans supported by seven piers in the water. The clearance below is 4.4 metres (14 ft) on the Aalborg side and 3.3 metres (11 ft) on the Nørresundby side. It is a bascule bridge with a counterweight of 400 metric tons (390 long tons; 440 short tons). The bridge carries a single standard gauge track with a maximum authorized speed of 60 kilometres per hour (37 mph).

== Operations ==
The bridge connects the Aalborg–Frederikshavn railway line with the Randers–Aalborg railway line as well as the rest of the Danish railway network. The bridge opens 4,000 times a year, and there are 10,000 annual sailings under it.

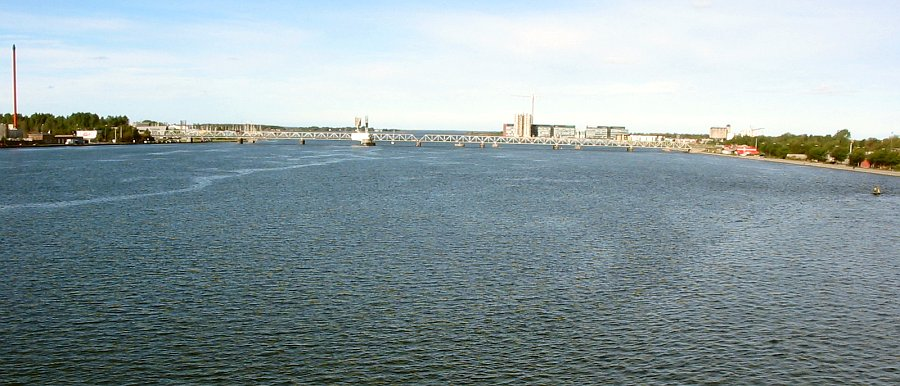
The Limfjord Railway Bridge

== Related reading ==
- Jensen, Niels (1972). Danske Jernbaner 1847–1972 [Danish railways 1847–1972] (in Danish). Copenhagen: J.Fr. Clausens Forlag. ISBN 87-11-01765-1.
- Jensen, Niels (1976). Nordjyske jernbaner [Railways of North Jutland] (in Danish). Copenhagen: J.Fr. Clausens Forlag. ISBN 87-11-03756-3.
