= Randers–Aalborg railway line =

Railway line in Denmark

Randers–Aalborg line
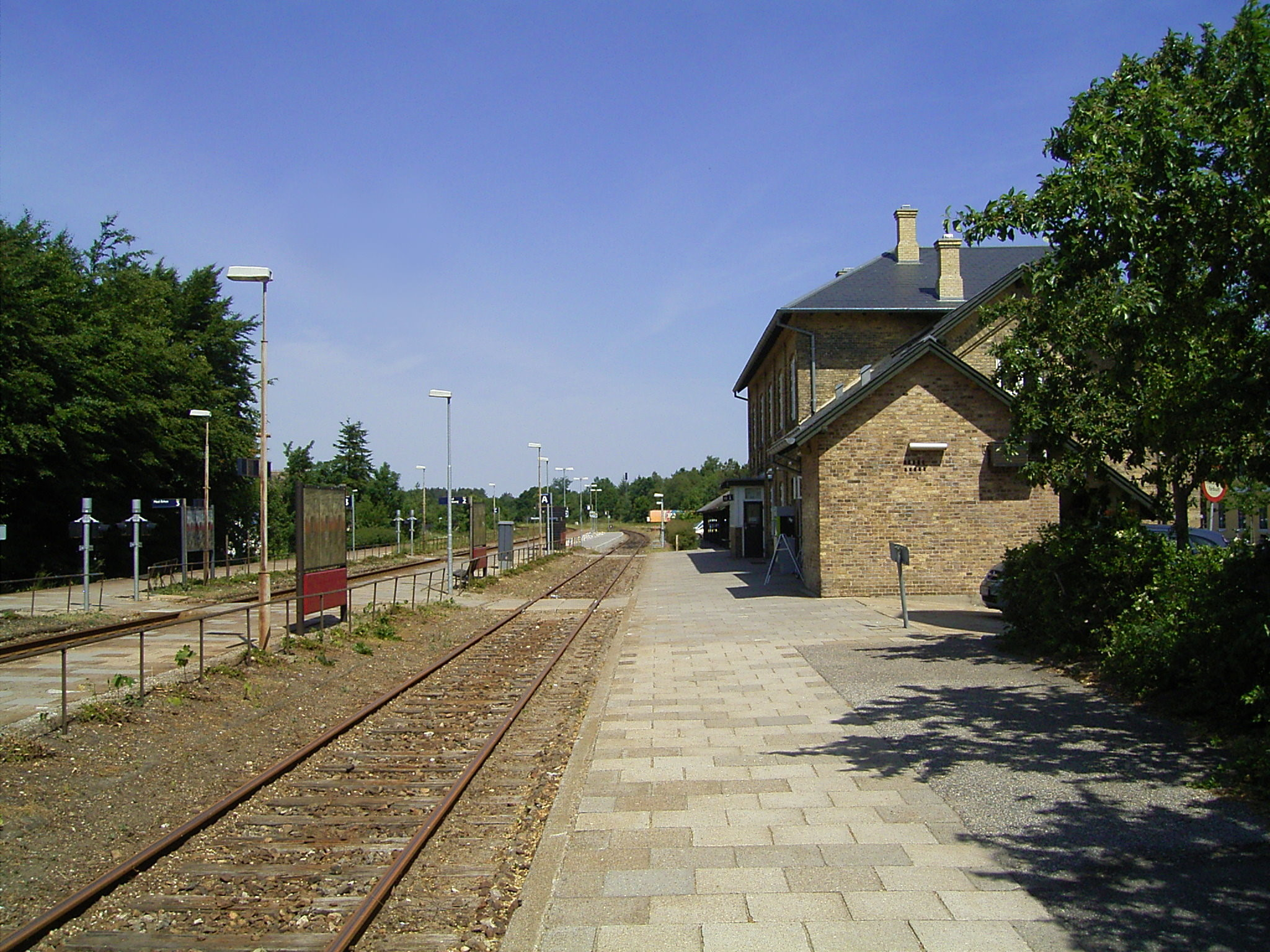
- The track and platforms at Skørping station in 2009

Overview
- Native name: Randers–Aalborg Jernbane
- Owner: Banedanmark
- Termini: Randers station; Aalborg station
- Stations: 8

Service
- Type: Railway
- System: Danish railway
- Operator(s): DSB; Nordjyske Jernbaner

History
- Opened: 18 September 1869

Technical
- Line length: 80.7 kilometres (50.1 mi)
- Number of tracks: Double
- Character: Passenger trains Freight trains
- Track gauge: 1,435 mm (4 ft 8 1/2 in)
- Electrification: None
- Operating speed: 180 km/h (Randers-Hobro); 120 km/h (Hobro-Aalborg)
Route map
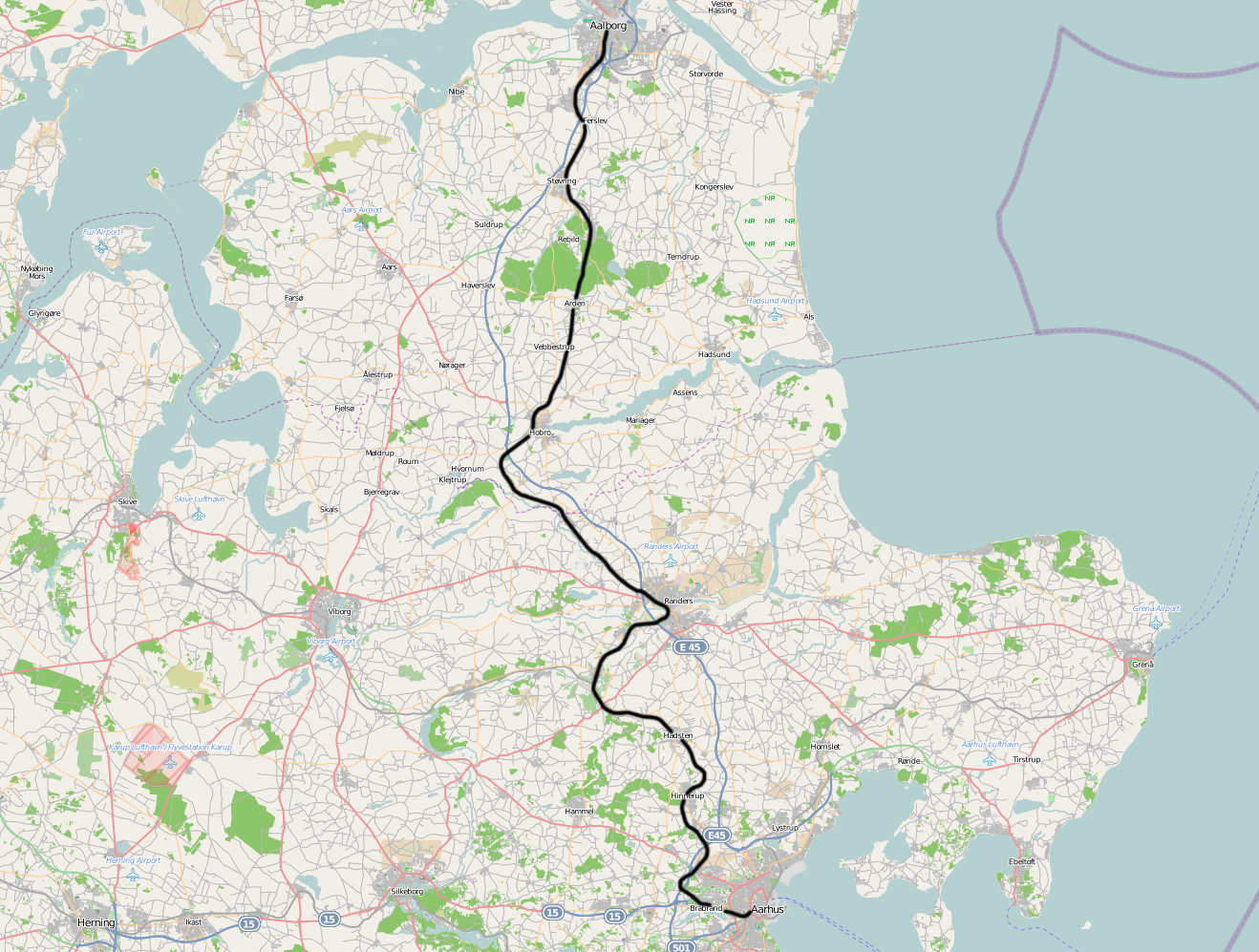
Map of the Aarhus–Aalborg railway line between Aarhus and Aalborg

The Randers–Aalborg railway line (Danish: Randers–Aalborg jernbane) is an 80.7 km (50.1 mi) long standard gauge double track railway line in Jutland, Denmark which runs through the historical region of Himmerland between the cities of Randers and Aalborg. It constitutes a section of the East Jutland longitudinal railway line (Danish: Den Østjyske Længdebane), the through route along the east coast of the Jutland Peninsula from the German border at Padborg to the port city of Frederikshavn in North Jutland.

The railway opened in 1869. From 1940 to 1953, the original single track railway line was converted to double track. The line is owned and maintained by Rail Net Denmark and served with passenger trains operated by the Danish State Railways (DSB). The northernmost section from Skørping to Aalborg is also served by the Aalborg Commuter Rail operated by Nordjyske Jernbaner.

== History ==
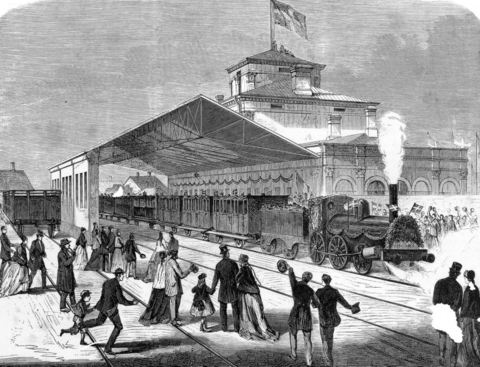
A xylography from 1869 showing the first train departing from Aalborg station on 18 September 1869.

The British civil engineering consortium Peto, Brassey and Betts was granted concession to build the Randers–Aalborg line on 18 March 1861. Work on the railway line started in October 1865, and was completed in the late summer of 1869. It was opened on 18 September 1869 in the presence of King Christian IX.

Operations on the line commenced the following day with three trains daily in each direction. The line was operated by the state-owned railway company De jysk-fyenske Jernbaner (the Funen and Jutland Railways), which merged with De sjællandske Statsbaner (the State Railways of Zealand) in 1885 to form one national railway company, De danske Statsbaner (the Danish State Railways).

During World War I traffic on the line became busy enough to be beyond the capacity of a single track. As a consequence, it was decided already in 1918 to expand the single track to a double track. However, the duplication work was only completed in different sections between 1940 and 1956, with the section from Skørping to Støvring being the last to be completed on 1 June 1956.

In 2003, the Aalborg Commuter Rail, a commuter rail service in and near Aalborg, started operating on the northernmost section of the railway line from Skørping to Aalborg. In 2017, operation of the regional rail services from Aalborg station to Skørping station were transferred from DSB to the local railway company Nordjyske Jernbaner.

== Stations ==
Station	Distance from Randers (km)	Distance from Aalborg (km)	Remarks
Randers	0	80.7	
Hobro	31.3	49.4	
Arden	46.8	33.9	
Skørping	54.4	26.3	
Støvring	61.8	18.9	Closed in 1974, reopened in 2003
Svenstrup	71.5	9.2	Closed in 1972, reopened in 2003
Skalborg	76.4	4.3	Closed in 1972, reopened in 2003
Aalborg	80.7	0	
