= Oddesund North railway station =

Railway station in Struer Municipality, Denmark

Oddesund Nord
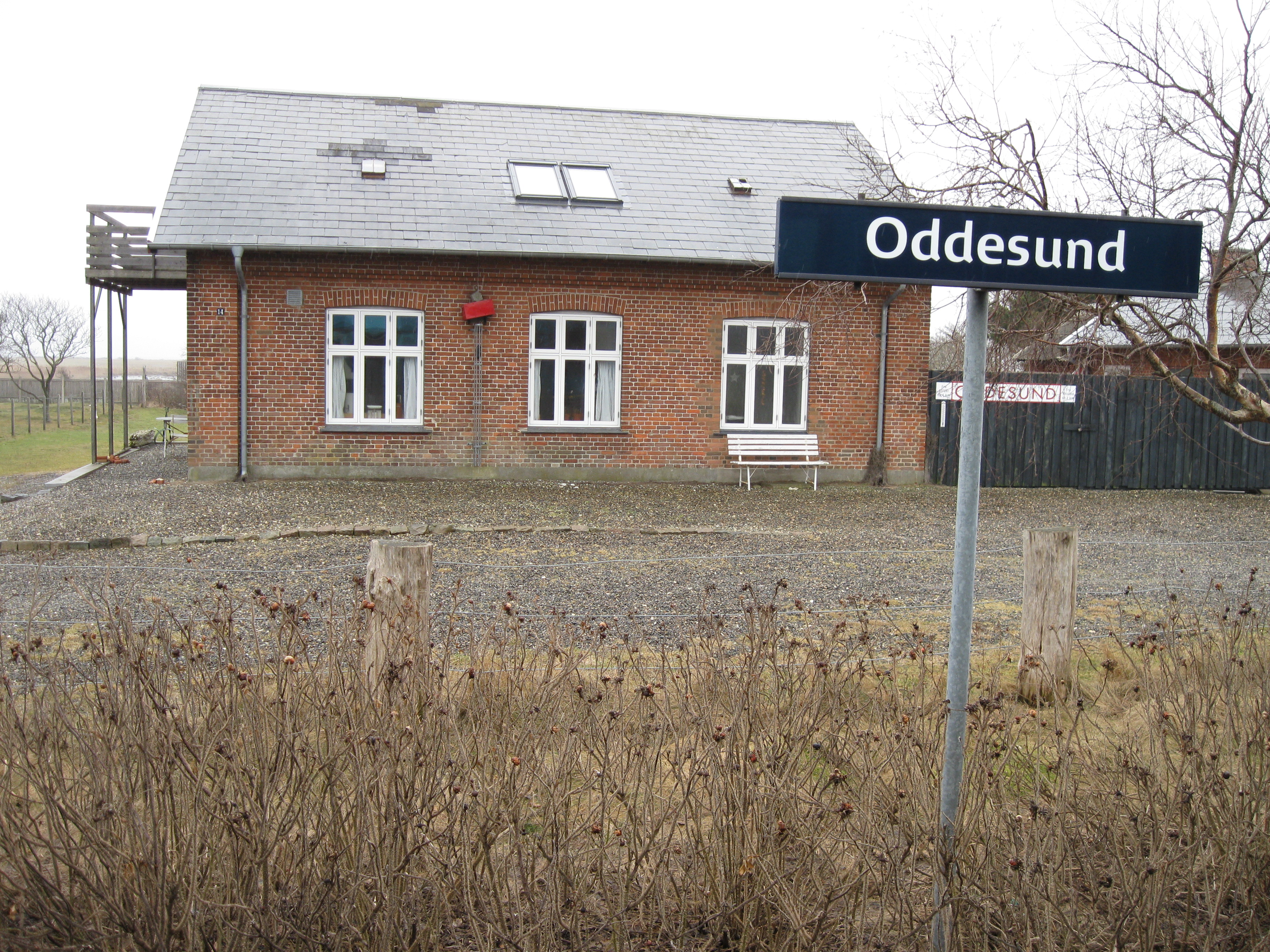
- Oddesund North station in 2010

General information
- Location: Plantagevej 1 Oddesund, 7790 Thyholm; Struer Municipality; Denmark
- Coordinates: 56°34′57.5″N 8°32′49″E
- Elevation: 1.6 metres (5 ft 3 in)
- Owner: Banedanmark
- Line: Thy Line
- Platforms: 1
- Tracks: 1
- Train operators: DSB

History
- Opened: 1882

Services
Preceding station	DSB Vores Tog	Following station
Humlum towards Struer	Struer–Thisted Regional train	Uglev towards Thisted
Location
- Location within Denmark Location within Central Denmark Region

Oddesund North station is a railway station serving the small settlement of Oddesund on the Thyholm Peninsula in Thy, Denmark.

The station is located on the Thy Line from Struer to Thisted. The station was opened in 1882 with the opening of the Thy Line. It offers direct regional train services to Struer and Thisted. The train services are operated by the national railway company DSB.

The station is among the smallest in Denmark with only 339 passengers in 2022, which equates to a daily average of under 1.

== See also ==
- List of railway stations in Denmark
- Rail transport in Denmark
