= Uglev railway station =

Railway station in Struer Municipality, Denmark

Uglev
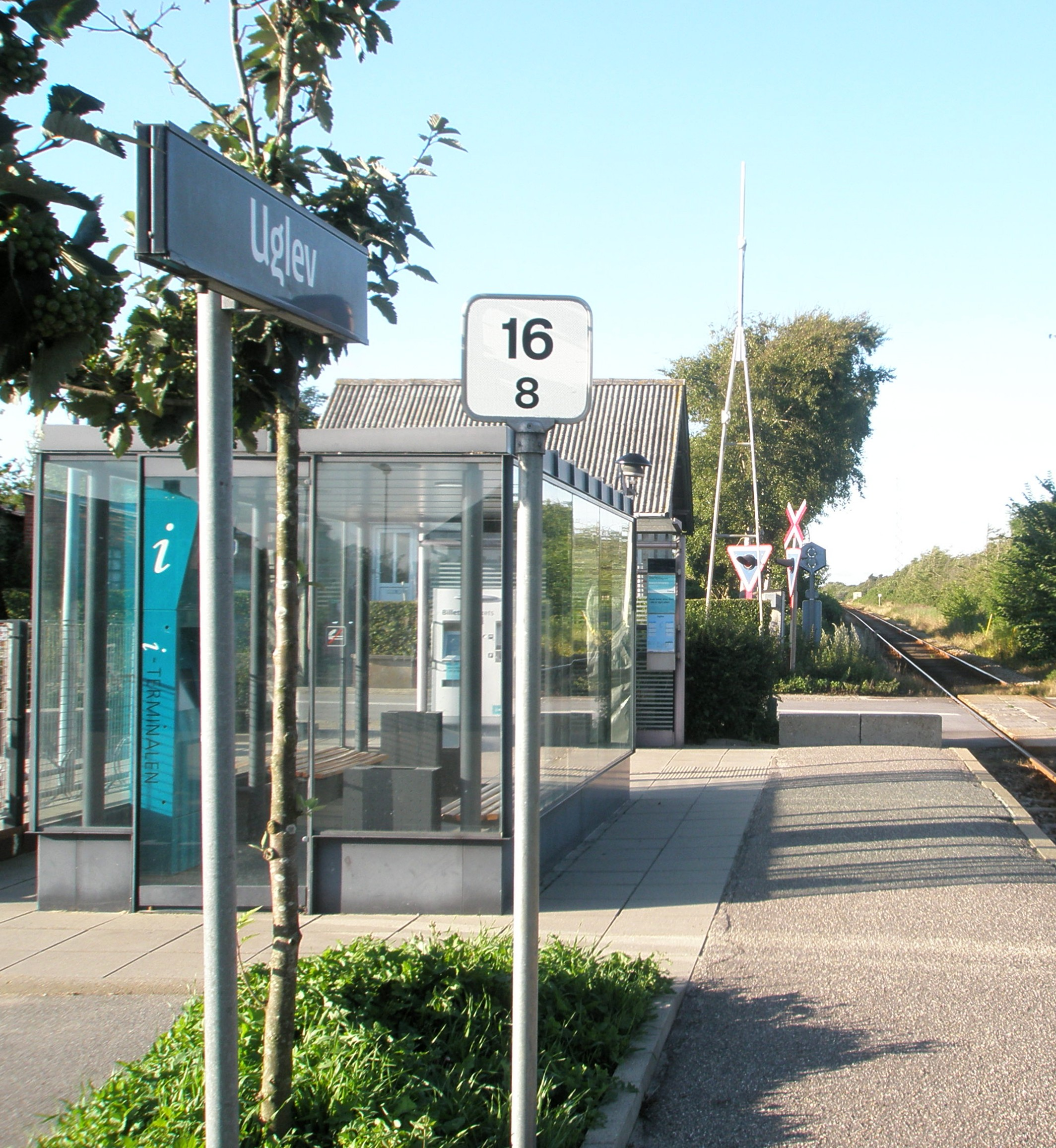
- Uglev station in 2011

General information
- Location: Saturnvej 3 Uglev, 7790 Thyholm; Struer Municipality; Denmark
- Coordinates: 56°36′44″N 8°32′29″E
- Elevation: 6.5 metres (21 ft)
- Owner: Banedanmark
- Line: Thy Line
- Platforms: 1
- Tracks: 1
- Train operators: DSB

History
- Opened: 1882

Services
Preceding station	DSB Vores Tog	Following station
Oddesund North towards Struer	Struer–Thisted Regional train	Hvidbjerg towards Thisted
Location
- Location within Denmark Location within Central Denmark Region

Uglev station is a railway station serving the small railway town of Uglev on the Thyholm Peninsula in Thy, Denmark.

The station is located on the Thy Line from Struer to Thisted. The station was opened in 1882 with the Thy Line. It offers direct regional train services to Struer and Thisted. The train services are operated by the national railway company DSB

== See also ==
- List of railway stations in Denmark
