= Hvidbjerg railway station =

Railway station in Struer Municipality, Denmark

Hvidbjerg
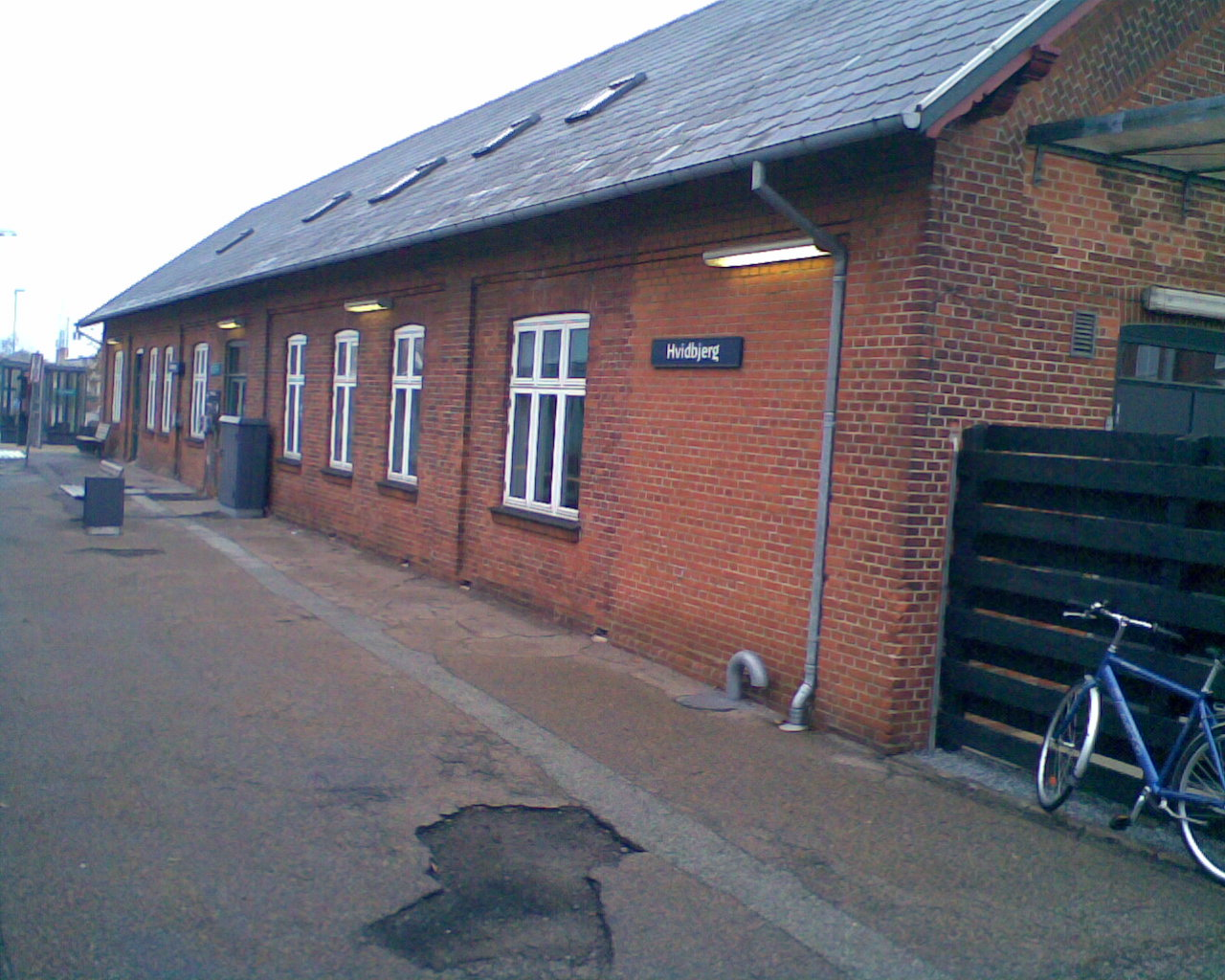
- Hvidbjerg station in 2008

General information
- Location: Bredgade 2 Hvidbjerg, 7790 Thyholm; Struer Municipality; Denmark
- Coordinates: 56°38′59″N 8°31′37″E
- Elevation: 21.3 metres (70 ft)
- Owner: DSB (station infrastructure); Banedanmark (rail infrastructure)
- Line: Thy Line
- Platforms: 2
- Tracks: 2
- Train operators: DSB

History
- Opened: 1882

Services
Preceding station	DSB Vores Tog	Following station
Uglev towards Struer	Struer–Thisted Regional train	Lyngs towards Thisted
Location
- Location within Denmark Location within Central Denmark Region

Hvidbjerg station is a railway station serving the railway town of Hvidbjerg on the Thyholm Peninsula in Thy, Denmark.

The station is located on the Thy Line from Struer to Thisted. The station was opened in 1882 with the opening of the Thy Line. It offers direct regional train services to Struer and Thisted. The train services at the station are operated by DSB.

== See also ==
- List of railway stations in Denmark
