= Lyngs railway station =

Railway station in Struer Municipality, Denmark

Lyngs
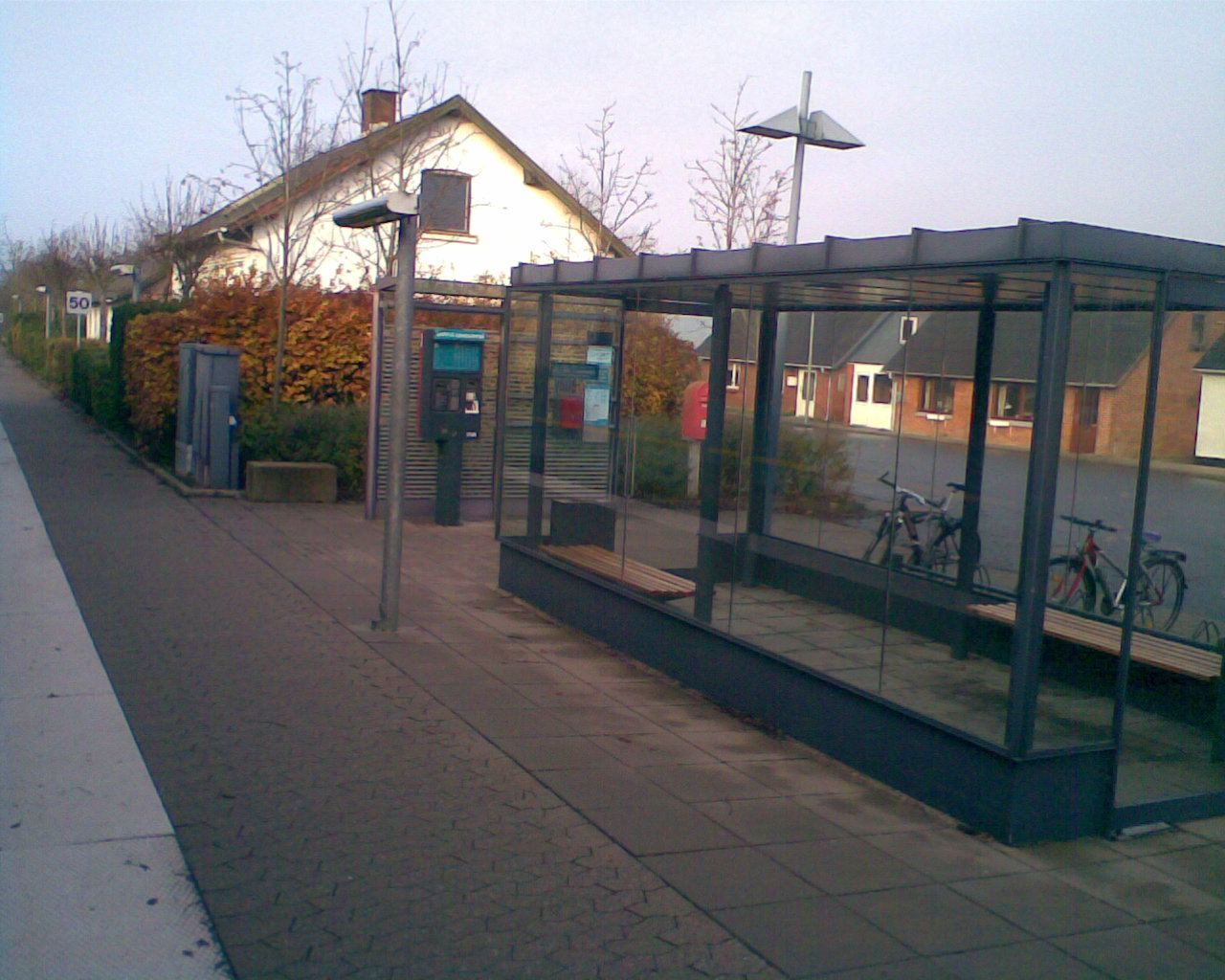
- Lyngs station in 2008

General information
- Location: Rosenallé 3 Lyngs, 7790 Thyholm; Struer Municipality; Denmark
- Coordinates: 56°39′51.7″N 8°27′3″E
- Elevation: 11.5 metres (38 ft)
- Owner: Banedanmark
- Line: Thy Line
- Platforms: 1
- Tracks: 1
- Train operators: DSB

History
- Opened: 1882

Services
Preceding station	DSB Vores Tog	Following station
Hvidbjerg towards Struer	Struer–Thisted Regional train	Ydby towards Thisted
Location
- Location within Denmark Location within Central Denmark Region

Lyngs station is a railway station serving the small village of Lyngs on the Thyholm Peninsula in Thy, Denmark.

The station is located on the Thy Line from Struer to Thisted. The station was opened in 1882 with the opening of the Thy Line. It offers direct regional train services to Struer and Thisted. The train services are operated by the national railway company DSB.

== See also ==
- List of railway stations in Denmark
- Rail transport in Denmark
- History of rail transport in Denmark
- Transportation in Denmark
