= Hørdum railway station =

Railway station in Hørdum, Denmark

Hørdum
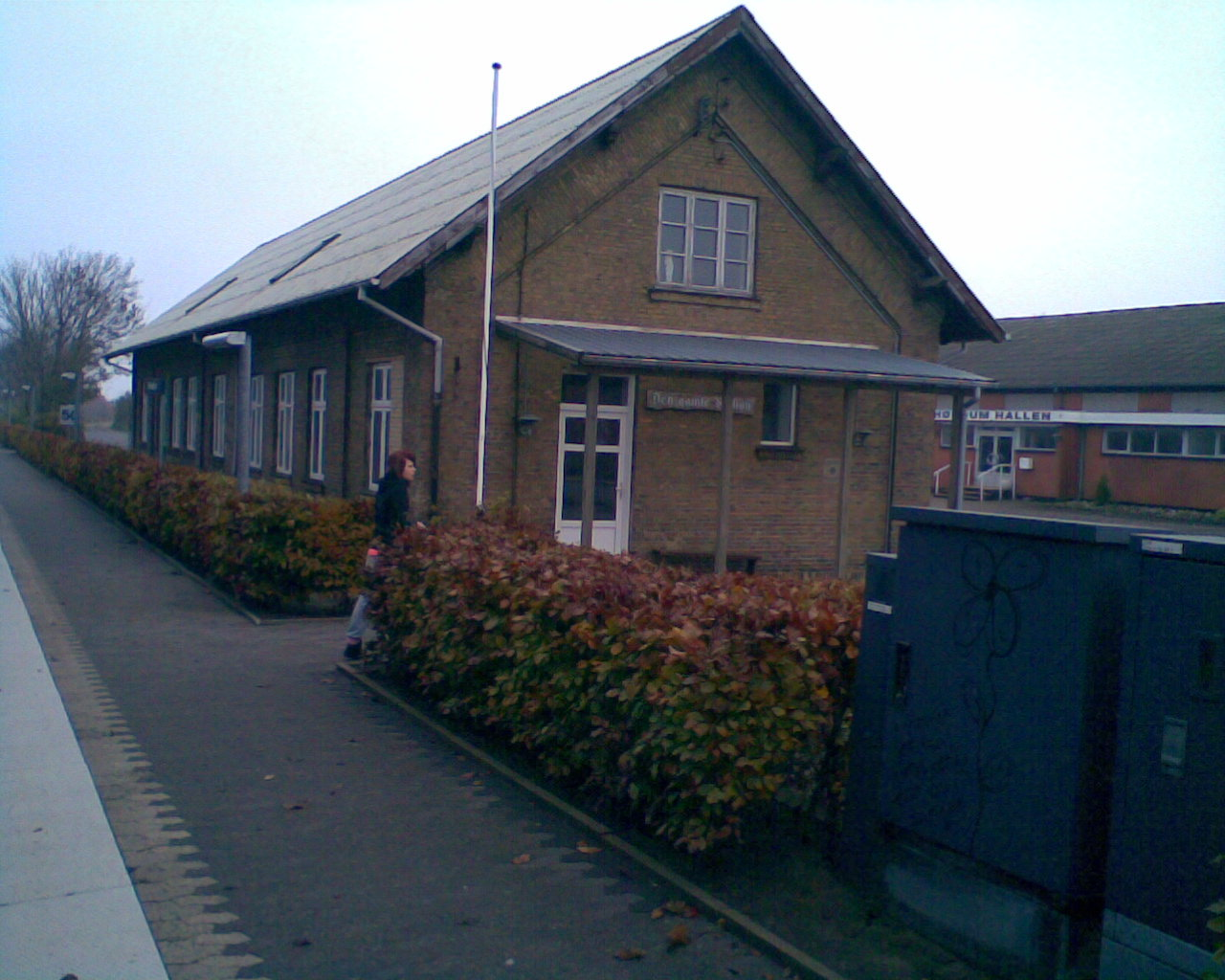
- Hørdum station in 2008

General information
- Location: Sportsvej 1 Hørdum, 7752 Snedsted; Thisted Municipality; Denmark
- Coordinates: 56°51′3″N 8°29′26″E
- Elevation: 22.9 metres (75 ft)
- Owner: DSB (station infrastructure); Banedanmark (rail infrastructure)
- Line: Thy Line
- Platforms: 1
- Tracks: 1
- Train operators: DSB

Construction
- Structure type: At-grade

Other information
- Station code: Hæ
- Website: Official website

History
- Opened: 20 April 1882; 144 years ago

Services
Preceding station	DSB Vores Tog	Following station
Bedsted Thy towards Struer	Struer–Thisted Regional train	Snedsted towards Thisted
Location
- Location within Denmark Location within North Jutland Region

Hørdum station is a railway station serving the small railway town of Hørdum in Thy, Denmark.

Hørdum station is located on the Thy Line from Struer to Thisted. The station was opened in 1882 with the opening of the Thy Line. It offers direct regional train services to Struer and Thisted. The train services are operated by the national railway company DSB.

== History ==
Hørdum railway station opened on 20 April 1882 as on one of the original intermediate stations on the Thy railway line. The station has been unstaffed since 1 May 1967.

== Operations ==
The train services are currently operated by the national train operating company DSB which run frequent local train services between Thisted and Struer with onward connections from Struer to the rest of Denmark. DSB also ran a twice daily InterCity service from the station to Copenhagen until December 2019.

== Station facilities ==
The station has a bicycle parking station as well as a car park with approximately 15 parking spaces.

== See also ==
- List of railway stations in Denmark
- Rail transport in Denmark
- History of rail transport in Denmark
- Transport in Denmark
