= Ydby railway station =

Railway station in Thisted Municipality, Denmark

Ydby
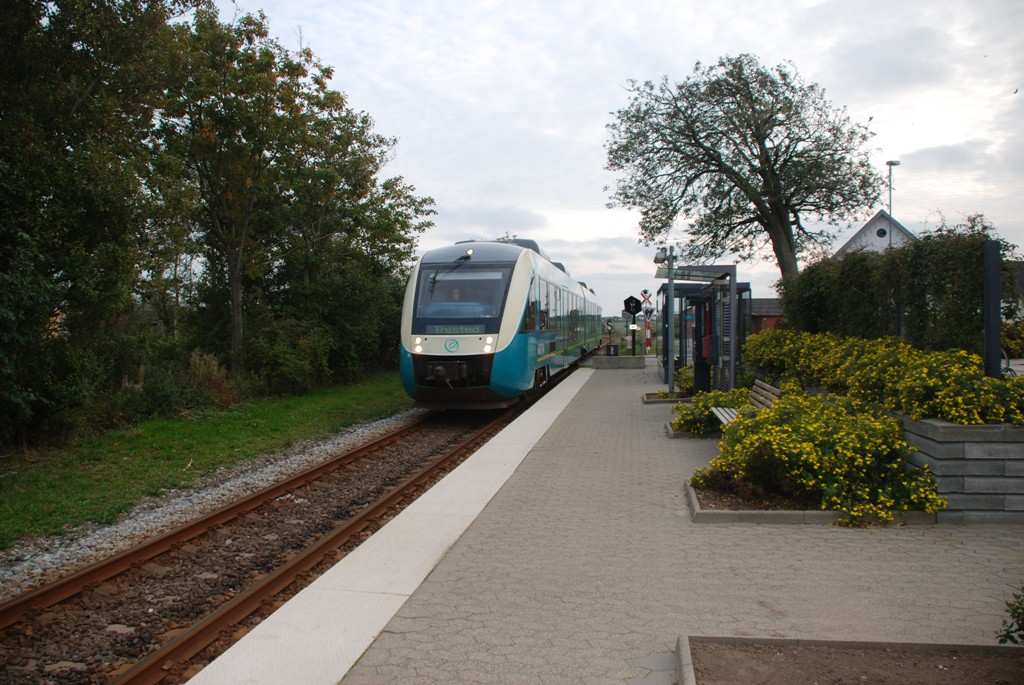
- Ydby station in 2010

General information
- Location: Ydby Stationsvej 2B; Ydby, 7760 Hurup Thy; Thisted Municipality; Denmark
- Coordinates: 56°42′52″N 8°23′55.5″E
- Elevation: 27.3 metres (90 ft)
- Owner: Banedanmark
- Line: Thy Line
- Platforms: 1
- Tracks: 1
- Train operators: DSB

History
- Opened: 1882

Services
Preceding station	DSB Vores Tog	Following station
Lyngs towards Struer	Struer–Thisted Regional train	Hurup Thy towards Thisted
Location
- Location within Denmark Location within North Jutland Region

Ydby station is a railway station serving the village of Ydby in Thy, Denmark.

The station is located on the Thy Line from Struer to Thisted. The station was opened in 1882 with the opening of the Thy Line. It offers direct regional train services to Struer and Thisted. The train services are operated by the national railway company DSB.

== See also ==
- List of railway stations in Denmark
- Rail transport in Denmark
