= Snedsted railway station =

Railway station in Thisted Municipality, Denmark

Snedsted
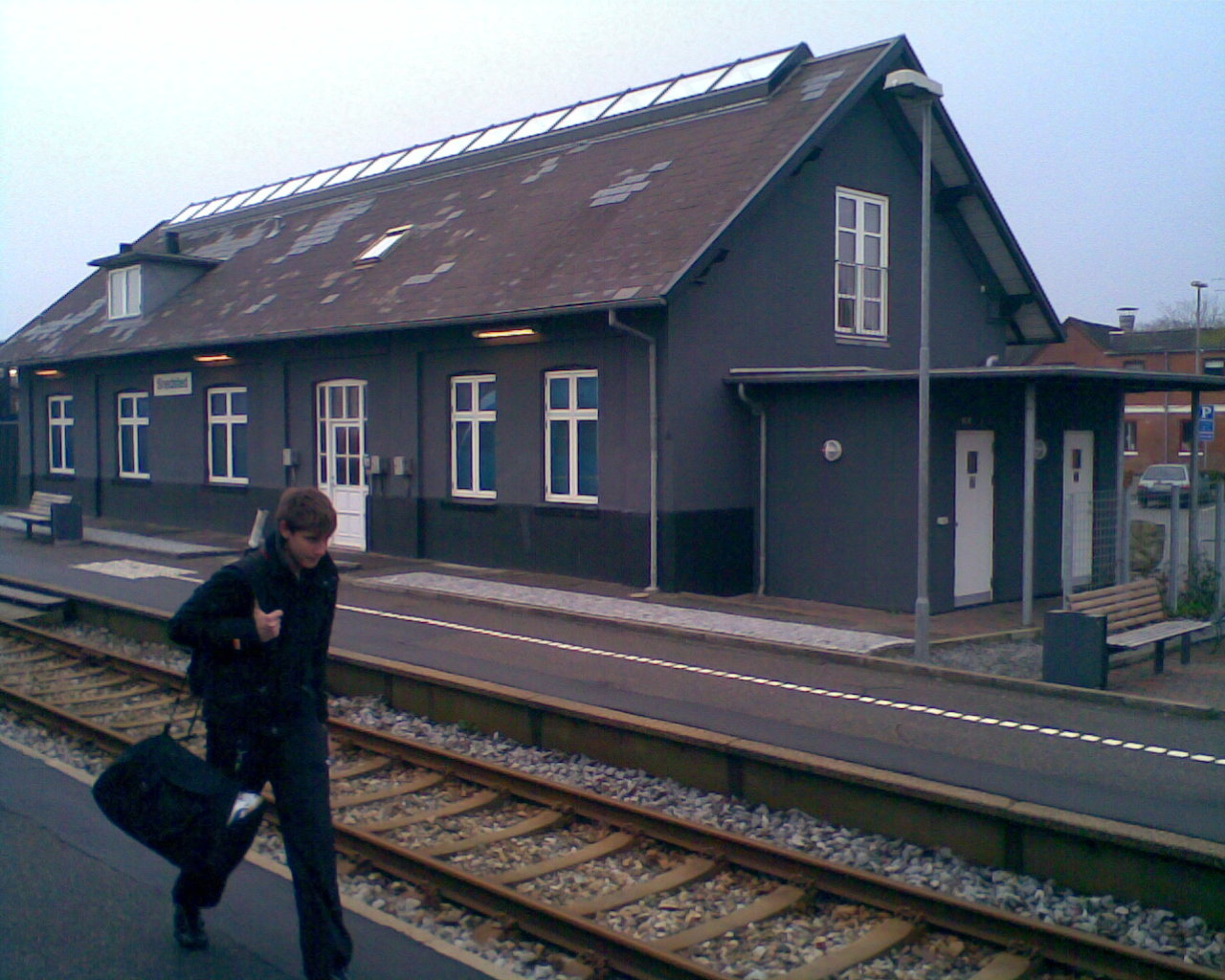
- Snedsted station in 2008

General information
- Location: Banegårdsvej 1; 7752 Snedsted; Thisted Municipality; Denmark
- Coordinates: 56°53′32″N 8°31′38″E
- Elevation: 27.0 metres (88.6 ft)
- Owner: Banedanmark
- Line: Thy Line
- Platforms: 2
- Tracks: 2
- Train operators: DSB

History
- Opened: 1882

Services
Preceding station	DSB Vores Tog	Following station
Hørdum towards Struer	Struer–Thisted Regional train	Sjørring towards Thisted
Location
- Location within Denmark Location within North Jutland Region

Snedssted station is a railway station serving the small railway town of Snedsted in Thy, Denmark.

Snedsted station is located on the Thy Line from Struer to Thisted. The station was opened in 1882 with the opening of the Thy Line. It offers direct regional train services to Struer and Thisted. The train services are operated by the national railway company DSB.

== See also ==
- List of railway stations in Denmark
- Rail transport in Denmark
