= Hurup Thy railway station =

Railway station in Thy, Denmark

Hurup Thy
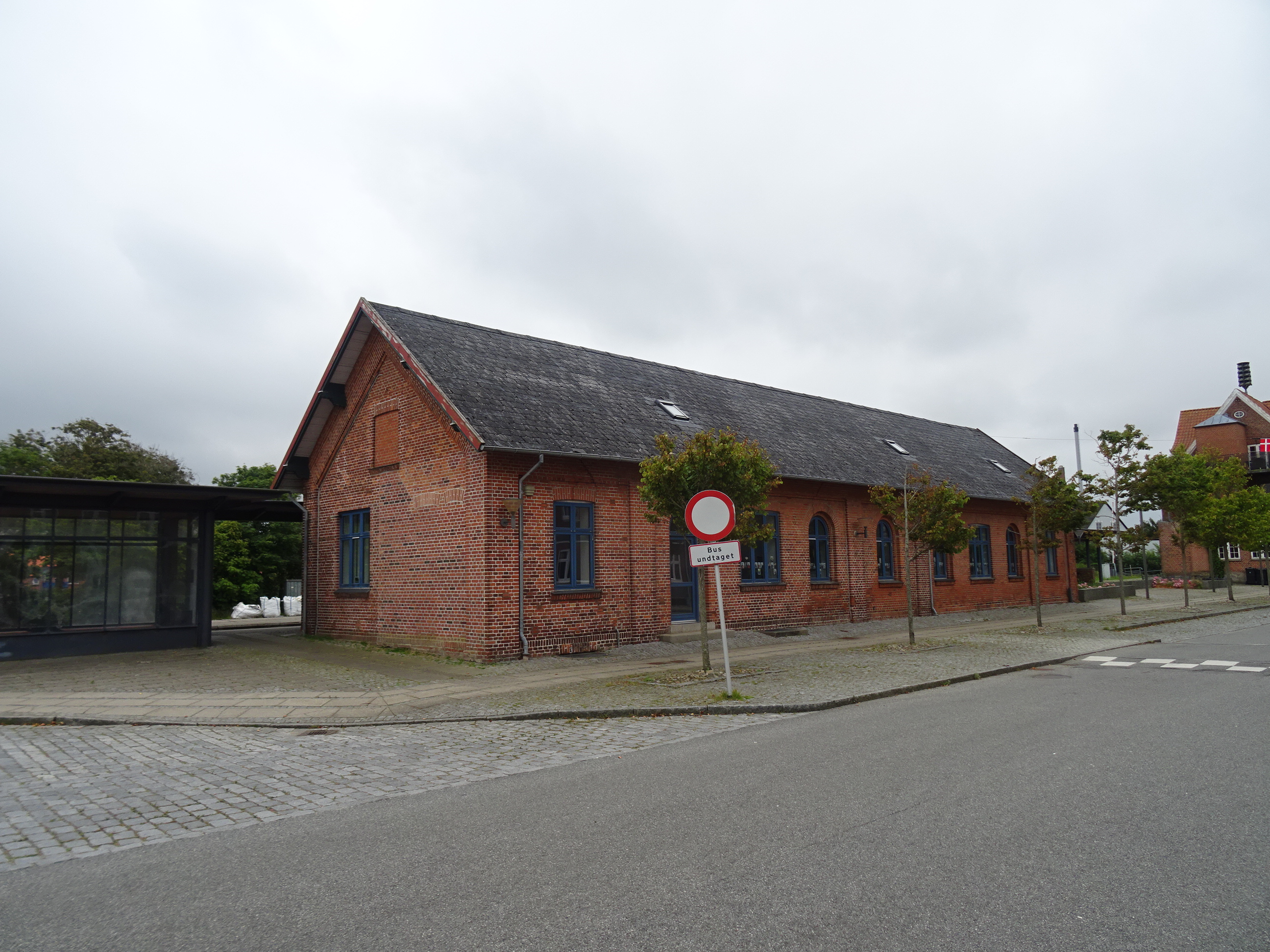
- Hurup Thy station in 2024

General information
- Location: Jernbanegade 4; 7760 Hurup Thy; Thisted Municipality; Denmark
- Coordinates: 56°45′4″N 8°25′5″E
- Elevation: 44.5 metres (146 ft)
- Owner: DSB (station infrastructure); Banedanmark (rail infrastructure)
- Line: Thy Line
- Platforms: 2
- Tracks: 2
- Train operators: DSB

History
- Opened: 1882

Services
Preceding station	DSB Vores Tog	Following station
Ydby towards Struer	Struer–Thisted Regional train	Bedsted Thy towards Thisted
Location
- Location within Denmark Location within North Jutland Region

Hurup Thy station is a railway station serving the railway town of Hurup in Thy, Denmark.

The station is located on the Thy Line from Struer to Thisted. The station was opened in 1882 with the opening of the Thy Line. It offers direct regional train services to Struer and Thisted. The train services are operated by the national railway company DSB

== See also ==
- List of railway stations in Denmark
- Rail transport in Denmark
