= Humlum railway station =

Railway station in Struer Municipality, Denmark

Humlum
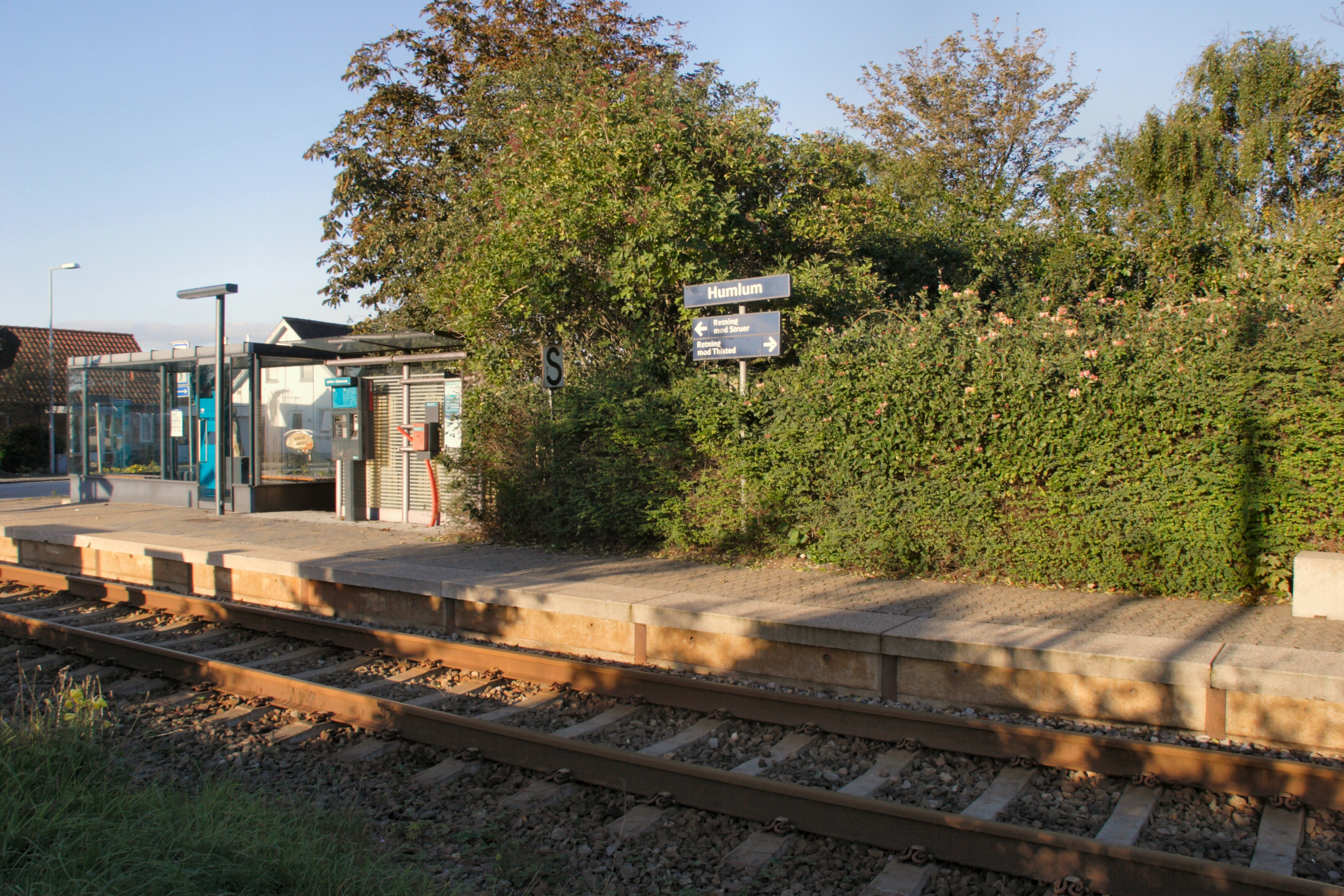
- Humlum station in 2010

General information
- Location: Kirstenvej 2A; Humlum, 7600 Struer; Struer Municipality; Denmark
- Coordinates: 56°32′27″N 8°33′9″E
- Elevation: 14.8 metres (49 ft)
- Owner: DSB (station infrastructure); Banedanmark (rail infrastructure)
- Line: Thy Line
- Platforms: 1
- Tracks: 1
- Train operators: DSB

History
- Opened: 1882

Services
Preceding station	DSB Vores Tog	Following station
Struer Terminus	Struer–Thisted Regional train	Oddesund North towards Thisted
Location
- Location within Denmark Location within Central Denmark Region

Humlum station is a railway station serving the small railway town of Humlum in Jutland, Denmark.

Humlum station is located on the Thy Line from Struer to Thisted. The station was opened in 1882 with the opening of the Thy Line. It offers direct regional train services to Struer and Thisted. The train services are operated by the national railway company DSB.

== See also ==
- List of railway stations in Denmark
- Rail transport in Denmark
