= Hørdum =

- Town
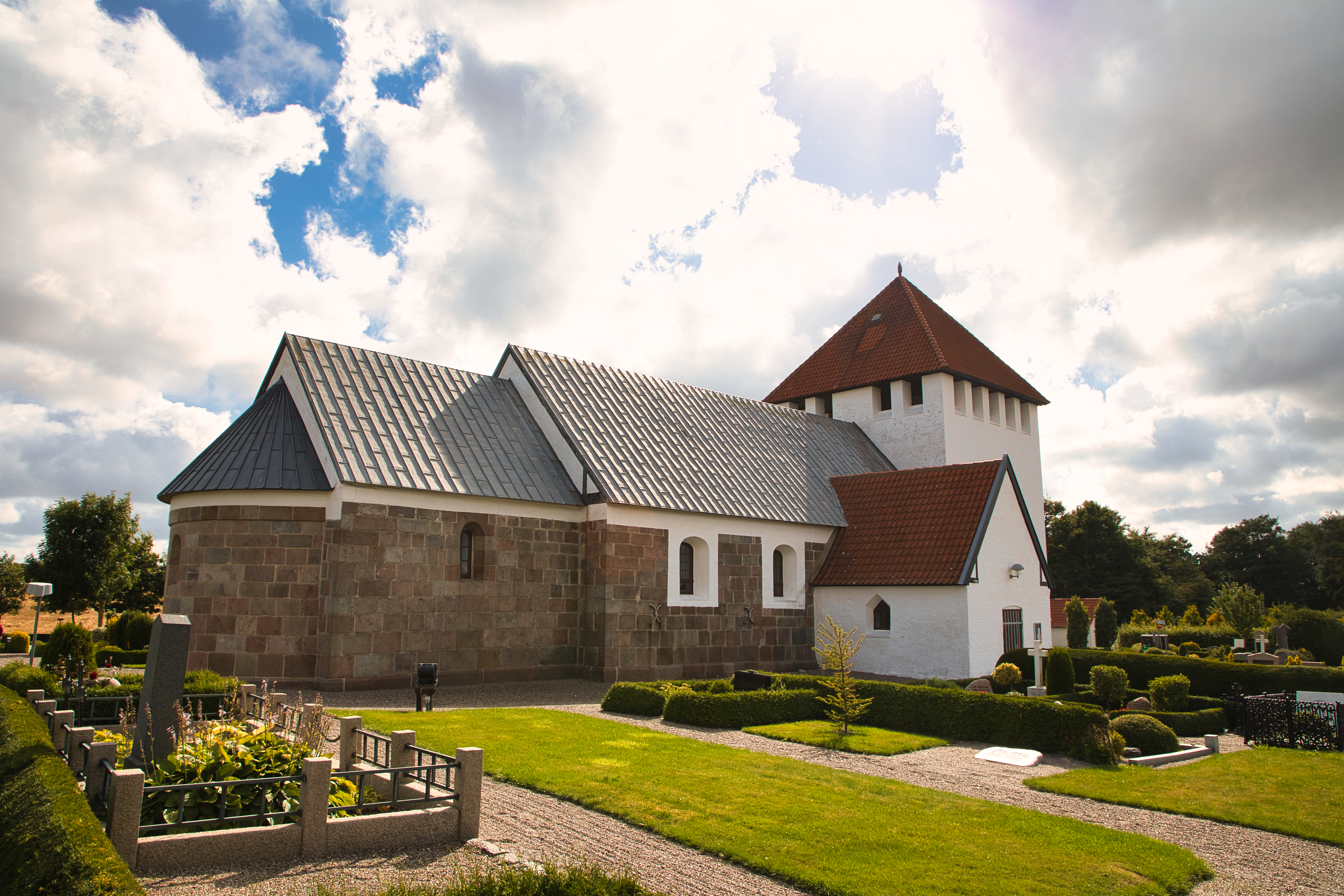
- Hørdum Church

- Location in North Jutland Region Hørdum (Denmark)
- Coordinates: 56°51′1″N 8°29′25″E
- Country: Denmark
- Region: North Jutland Region
- Municipality: Thisted Municipality

Population (2026)
  - Urban: 212
- Time zone: UTC+1 (CET)
  - Summer (DST): UTC+2 (CEST)
- Postal code: DK-7752 Snedsted

Hørdum is a small railway town in Thisted Municipality in North Jutland Region, Denmark. As of 1 January 2026 it had a population of 212. It is located in the southern part of the Thy district 20 km southwest of Thisted and 30 km west of Nykøbing Mors.

Hørdum is served by Hørdum railway station located on the Thy Line between Thisted and Struer.

The medieval Hørdum Church is located about 1 km east of the railway town on the western outskirts of the neighboring village of Koldby. The Hørdum stone, a Viking Age picture stone that depicts a legend from Norse mythology involving the god Thor and Jörmungandr, the Midgard serpent, is on display in the church.
