= Humlum =

- Town
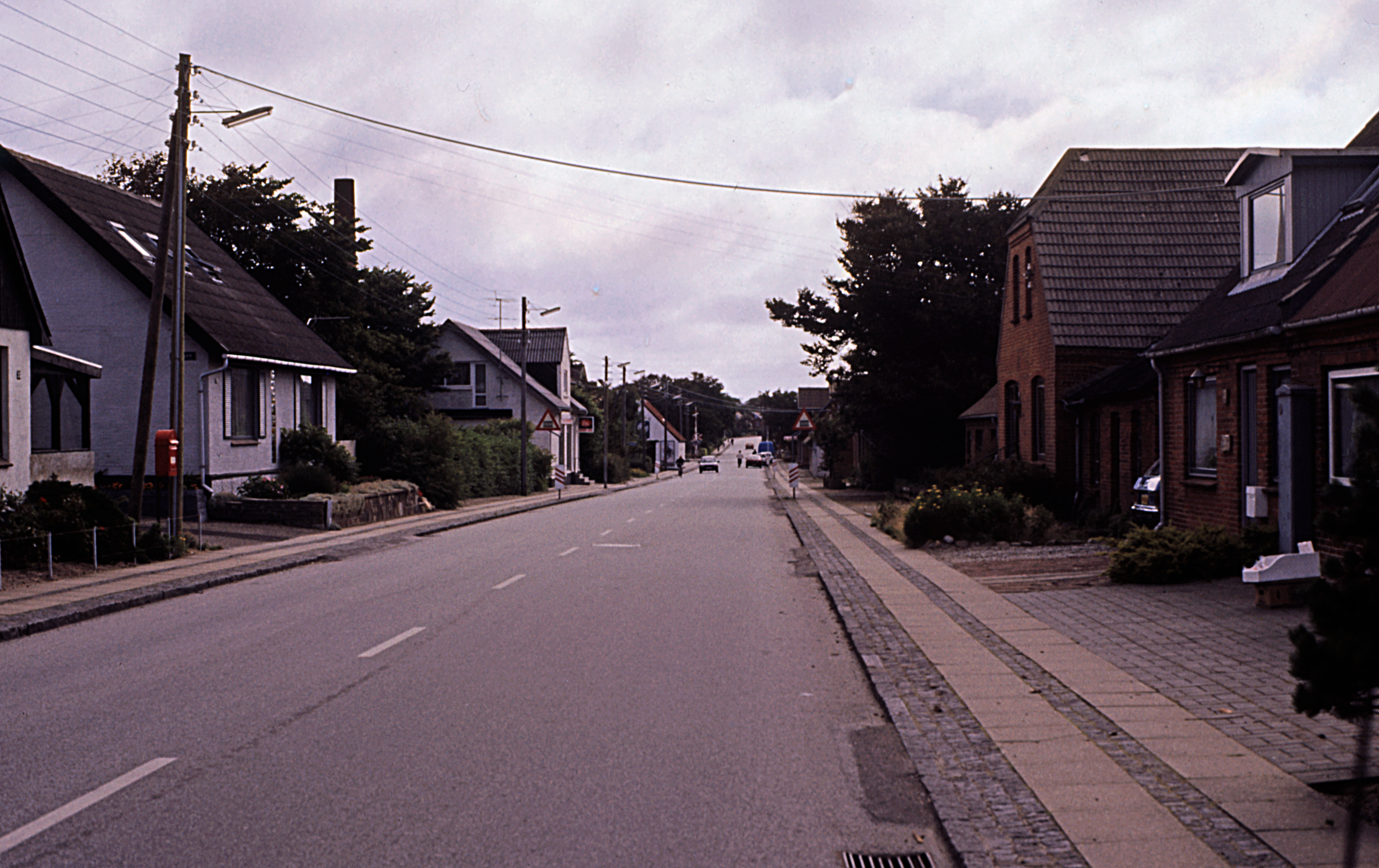
- The main street in Humlum

- Location in Central Denmark Region Humlum (Denmark)
- Coordinates: 56.53993°N 8.55185°E
- Country: Denmark
- Region: Central Denmark (Midtjylland)
- Municipality: Struer Municipality

Population (2026)
  - Total: 785
- Time zone: UTC+1 (CET)
  - Summer (DST): UTC+2 (CEST)

Humlum is a small railway town, with a population of 785 (1 January 2026), located about 5 km north of Struer and 3 km south of the Oddesund Bridge in Struer Municipality, Central Denmark Region in Denmark.

Humlum is served by Humlum railway station on the Thisted-Struer Line.

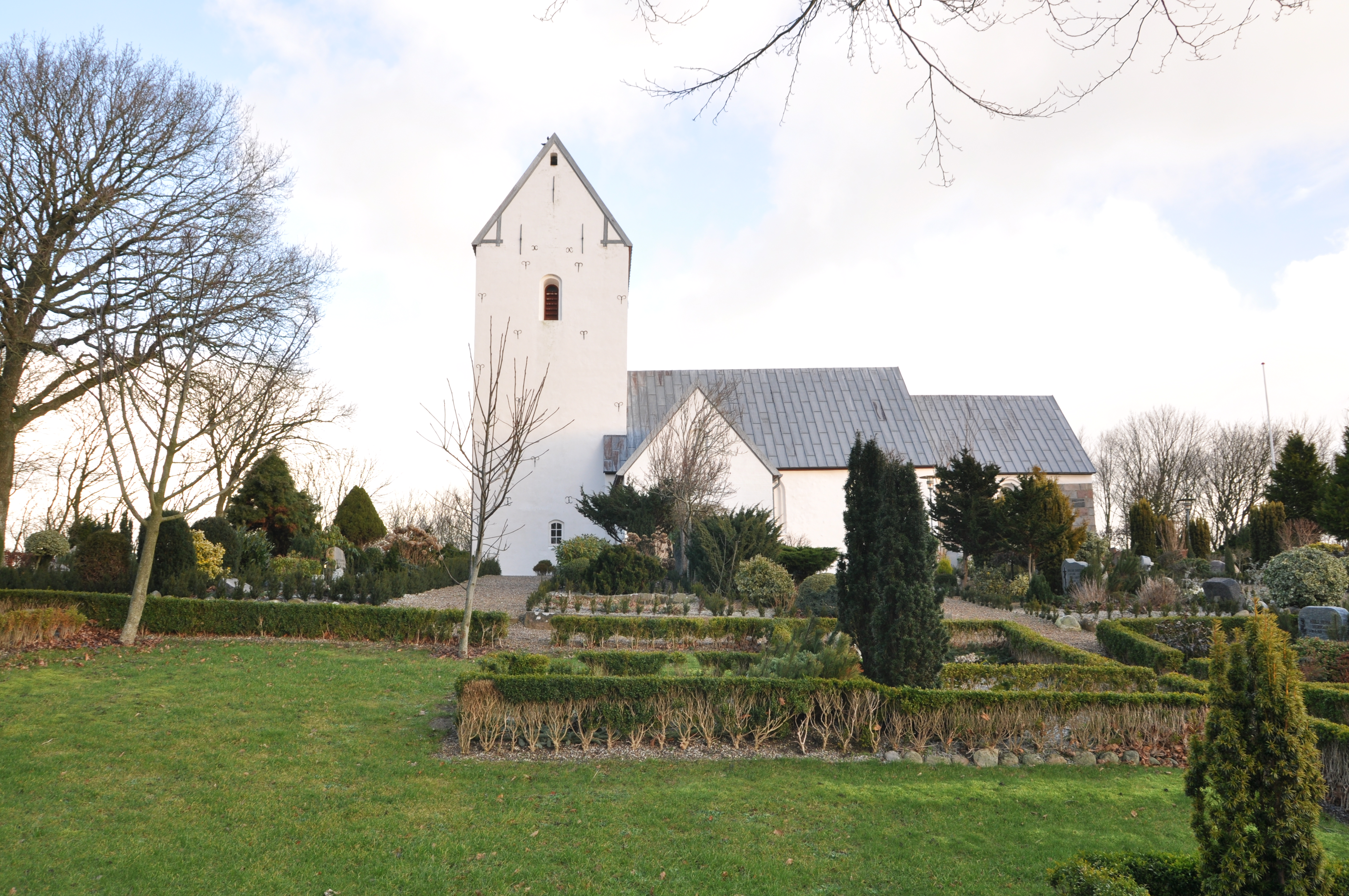
Humlum Church

Humlum Church stands on a high ground 1 km south of the town and was earlier used as a navigation mark by the mariners on the Limfjord.
