= North Jutlandic Island =

Northernmost part of Denmark and of Jutland

Native name: Nørrejyske Ø
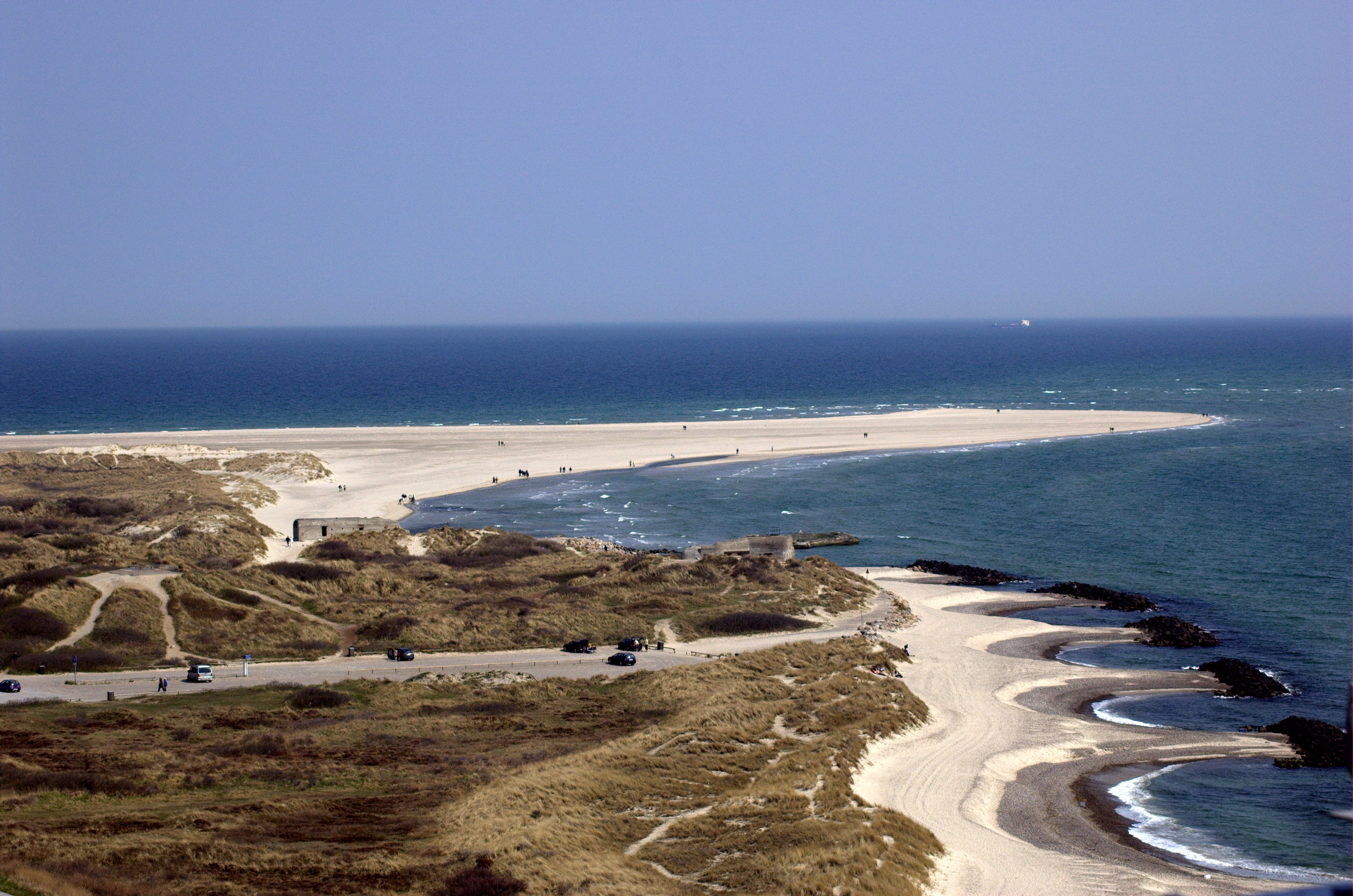
- The Grenen sand bar at the northern tip of the island

Geography
- Location: Skagerrak
- Coordinates: 57°6′N 9°30′E
- Area: 4,685 km^{2} (1,809 sq mi)
- Highest elevation: 136 m (446 ft)
- Highest point: Knøsen

Administration
- Denmark
- Region: North Denmark Region
- Largest settlement: Hjørring (pop. 24,963)

Demographics
- Population: 294,424 (2020)
- Pop. density: 63.32/km^{2} (164/sq mi)

The North Jutlandic Island (Danish: Nørrejyske Ø), Vendsyssel-Thy, or Jutland north of the Limfjord (Jylland nord for Limfjorden) is the northernmost part of continental Denmark and of Jutland. It is more common to refer to the three traditional districts of Vendsyssel, Hanherred, and Thy. The area has been intermittently a tied island and, during modern times, was not surrounded by water until a storm in February 1825, which severed the region from the remainder of Jutland and created a water connection between the North Sea and the western end of the Limfjord. Vendsyssel-Thy retains its traditional status as a part of Jutland even though it is now an island.

By area, it is the second-largest island of Denmark after Zealand (excluding Greenland), with a population of 294,424 on 1 January 2020. The population has declined in recent decades; 309,834 people lived on the island in 1981.

Danes rarely refer to the area as a whole, but more often to the three constituent districts or to North Jutland (which also includes an area south of the Limfjord). The adjectives nordenfjords and søndenfjords are also commonly used, meaning north and south of the fjord, respectively. The names can all be considered ad hoc creations, as a traditional name for the island is lacking.

== History ==
The narrow sand tombolo of Agger Tange connected North Jutland Island to the Jutland Peninsula between c. 1200 and 1825. The area became an island again due to a storm on 3 February 1825, when the North Sea broke through the Agger Tange in its far southwest, separating the area from mainland Jutland and creating the Agger Channel. The current separator is the Thyborøn Channel, which was created slightly further south by a flood in 1862. The original Agger Channel filled up with sand in 1877.

The syssel was a medieval sub-division which is regarded as the oldest type of administrative unit in Denmark, having existed since before the Middle Ages. The land of the North Jutlandic Island was divided into two of these: Thysyssel (including Hanherred) and Vendsyssel.

== Geography ==
The island is marked by very flat terrain with dry, grassy slopes and sandy coasts, especially on its north and east. The island hosts the largest sand dune in northern Europe, the Råbjerg Mile.

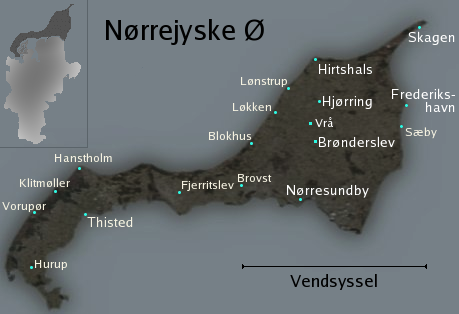
Vendsyssel-Thy: Thy at west, Hanherred (with the towns Fjerritslev and Brovst) in the middle, and Vendsyssel at east and north.

The North Jutlandic Island consists of these three traditional regions:

- Vendsyssel, the largest part to the east and north,
- Thy, the lesser part to the west,
- Hanherrederne, or Hanherred, is the central isthmus connecting Vendsyssel and Thy.

Since 1 January 2007, when the Danish municipal reform became effective, these areas, along with Himmerland and the islands of Mors and Læsø have constituted the North Jutland Region, the smallest of Denmark's five regions by population. Ecclesiastically, the North Jutland Islands are the main part of the Diocese of Aalborg.

In traditional terms, the westernmost part of the island, Thy, is considered part of both Northern and Western Jutland simultaneously. The term North West Jutland refers to Thy, the island Mors, and the parts of mainland Jutland bordering the western Limfjord, such as the peninsula of Salling and around the towns of Struer and Lemvig.

=== Key facts ===
- Area: 4,685 km^{2}
- Population: 294,424 (January 1, 2020)

Major towns
Traditional district	Town	Population (2025)
Vendsyssel	Hjørring	25,908
Vendsyssel	Frederikshavn	22,548
Vendsyssel	Skagen	7,394
Vendsyssel	Brønderslev	12,946
Vendsyssel	Sæby	8,991
Vendsyssel	Hirtshals	5,347
Vendsyssel	Løkken	1,669
Vendsyssel	Nørresundby (the northern part of Aalborg, which is mainly south of the Limfjord)	24,436
Hanherred	Fjerritslev	3,306
Hanherred	Brovst	2,684
Thy	Thisted	13,305
Thy	Hanstholm	2,050
Thy	Hurup	2,657

== Transport ==
=== Road ===
The largest motorways on the island are European route E39 and European route E45, which run from Nørresundby to Hirtshals (with a bypass around Hjørring on its east) and Frederikshavn respectively. The main east-west road across the island is national road 11 that runs non-continuously west from Aabybro to Oddesund, intermitted with parts of national roads 29 and 26.

=== Airport ===
The island has one international airport, which is Aalborg Airport. As of 5 September 2025 it offered flights to Kastrup Airport, Bornholm Airport, Oslo Gardermoen Airport, Amsterdam Airport Schiphol, Nice Côte d'Azur Airport, and various holiday destinations on the northwest and northeast Mediterranean coasts.

=== Rail ===
Nordjyllands Trafikselskab operates regional lines on the island, the longest being Aalborg-Skagen through the Vendsyssel Line and Skagen Line, along with a small off-branch to Hirtshals on the Hirtshals Line.

The Thy Line runs south from Thisted railway station to across Oddesund.

The national DSB high-speed lines do not go north of Aalborg Airport railway station, requiring transits in Aalborg or at Struer railway station to get to or from the rest of Denmark.

=== Boat ===
Hirtshals and Frederikshavn are major ferry terminals for international routes. Hirtshals has routes as of May 2025 to Larvik, Bergen (via Stavanger), Langesund, and Seyðisfjörður (via Tórshavn), while Frederikshavn has a route to Göteborg.

=== Connections to rest of Denmark ===
The island has seven fixed transport links to the mainland: Four road bridges (including national road 180 at Limfjordsbroen, national road 29 at Aggersund, and national road 11 at Oddesund Bridge), one road tunnel (European route E45 at Limfjordstunnelen), and two rail bridges. There are also two short-distance car ferry connections, one each at the west and right outlets of the Limfjord.

Ferries connects Frederikshavn to the islands of Læsø and Hirsholm.

There was technically a ferry between Frederikshavn and København, but the operators (Initially DFDS Seaways year-round, and later Gotlandsbolaget as a seasonal winter route) prohibited passengers from boarding on only the stretch between the 2 cities, instead only allowing passengers who were bound for Oslo northbound, or from Oslo to either city southbound.

== Culture ==
=== Sports ===
The most successful team internationally on the island is the women's association football team Fortuna Hjørring. They reached the final of the 2002–03 UEFA Women's Cup, and have performed well in the UEFA Women's Champions League (more often than not reaching at least the Round of 16) even after the increasing professionalisation of women's club football across Europe.

In men's football, Vendsyssel FF plays in the NordicBet Liga (National tier 2).

In men's ice hockey, Frederikshavn White Hawks plays in the national Metal Ligaen. As of May 2025, they had most recently made it to the Danish final in the 2012–13 season and have never played in the European Champions Hockey League.

=== Media ===
Radio stations based on the island include Skaga FM, Radio Nord, ANR, and Vendsyssel FM. Danish national stations and stations broadcasting from Aalborg are also available on DAB+ and on FM radio. Television channel selections are generally the same as in the rest of Denmark. In national systems for regional broadcasters, the island forms part of the TV2 Nord and DR P4 Nordjylland designated areas.

=== Amusement parks ===
The biggest amusement park on the island is Fårup Sommerland, located between the villages of Blokhus and Saltum. The park is open intermittently from roughly early May to mid-October, with the most frequent opening days per week being from June to August.

== Climate ==
The climate is temperate oceanic on the Köppen climate classification. Frost is common in the winter, and snow occurs from time to time.

Climate data for Skagen (1971–2000)
Month	Jan	Feb	Mar	Apr	May	Jun	Jul	Aug	Sep	Oct	Nov	Dec	Year
Record high °C (°F)	10.2 (50.4)	11.5 (52.7)	15.7 (60.3)	19.0 (66.2)	23.6 (74.5)	27.1 (80.8)	28.2 (82.8)	29.0 (84.2)	22.6 (72.7)	19.0 (66.2)	13.2 (55.8)	11.1 (52.0)	29.0 (84.2)
Mean daily maximum °C (°F)	3.0 (37.4)	2.7 (36.9)	4.6 (40.3)	8.4 (47.1)	13.7 (56.7)	17.2 (63.0)	19.5 (67.1)	19.2 (66.6)	15.5 (59.9)	11.4 (52.5)	7.3 (45.1)	4.7 (40.5)	10.6 (51.1)
Daily mean °C (°F)	1.4 (34.5)	1.0 (33.8)	2.5 (36.5)	5.6 (42.1)	10.5 (50.9)	14.0 (57.2)	16.3 (61.3)	16.2 (61.2)	13.1 (55.6)	9.5 (49.1)	5.7 (42.3)	3.1 (37.6)	8.2 (46.8)
Mean daily minimum °C (°F)	−0.7 (30.7)	−1.1 (30.0)	0.3 (32.5)	2.9 (37.2)	7.5 (45.5)	10.9 (51.6)	13.1 (55.6)	13.0 (55.4)	10.4 (50.7)	7.1 (44.8)	3.6 (38.5)	1.0 (33.8)	5.7 (42.3)
Record low °C (°F)	−16.5 (2.3)	−15.0 (5.0)	−10.8 (12.6)	−4.8 (23.4)	−3.0 (26.6)	3.2 (37.8)	6.0 (42.8)	5.5 (41.9)	1.3 (34.3)	−2.6 (27.3)	−5.8 (21.6)	−12.4 (9.7)	−16.5 (2.3)
Average precipitation mm (inches)	52.4 (2.06)	32.1 (1.26)	40.4 (1.59)	33.7 (1.33)	43.6 (1.72)	54.6 (2.15)	48.8 (1.92)	61.9 (2.44)	75.5 (2.97)	75.6 (2.98)	66.1 (2.60)	58.5 (2.30)	643.2 (25.32)
Average precipitation days (≥ 0.1 mm)	16.5	12.3	13.7	11.2	11.1	11.8	10.1	11.8	14.4	16.0	16.6	16.7	162.3
Average snowy days	5.8	4.6	3.7	1.2	0.0	0.0	0.0	0.0	0.0	0.1	1.2	3.7	20.3
Average relative humidity (%)	93	91	91	87	86	87	87	87	87	88	90	92	89
Mean monthly sunshine hours	59	77	135	194	291	274	306	257	164	101	56	48	1,969
Source: Danish Meteorological Institute (humidity 1978–1997)

== See also ==
- Vendsyssel
- Hanherred
- Thy (district)
- Traditional districts of Denmark
- List of islands of Denmark
