= Hvidbjerg =

- Town
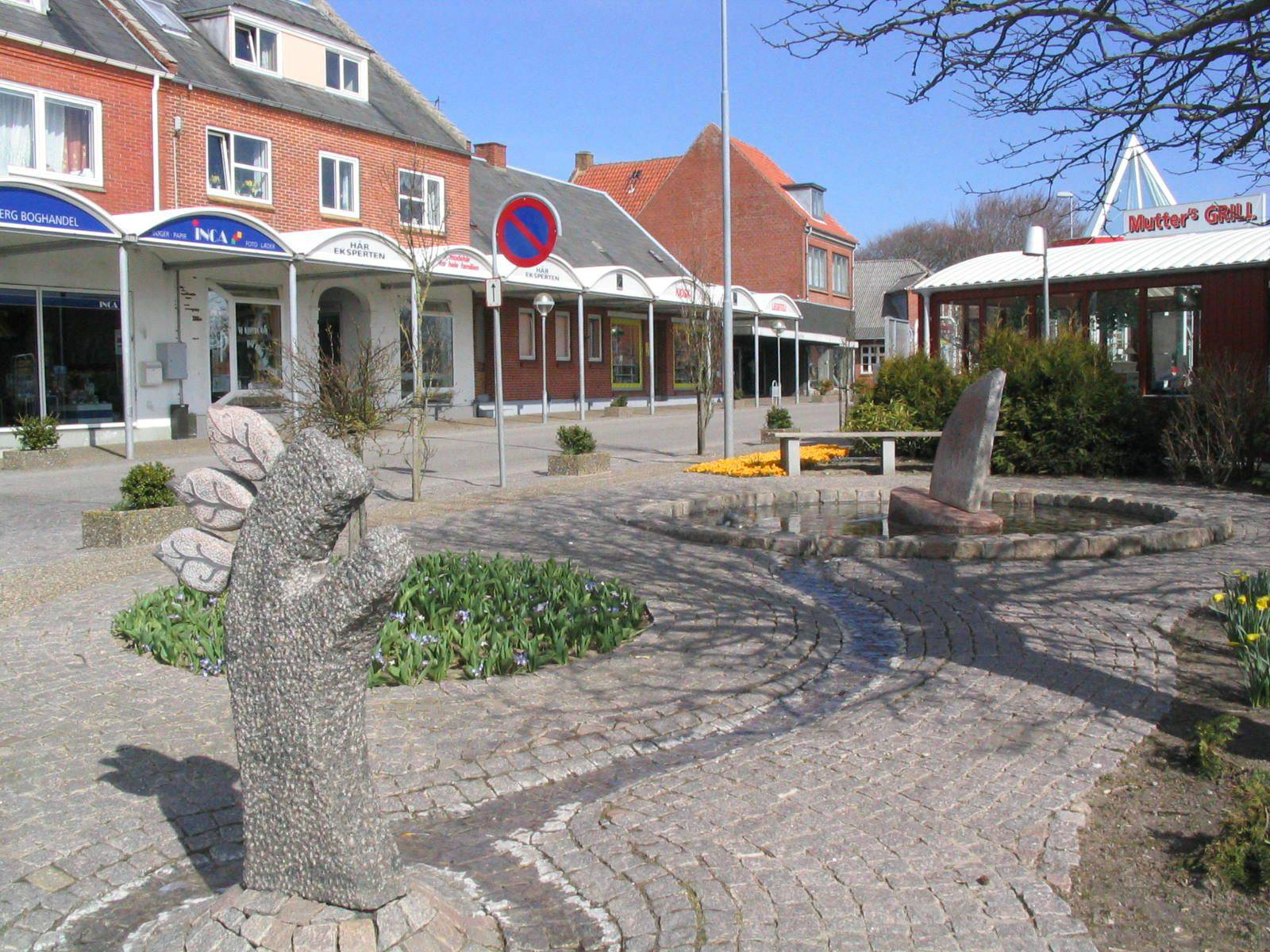
- The Square in Hvidbjerg

- Location in Denmark Hvidbjerg (Central Denmark Region)
- Coordinates: 56°38′59″N 8°31′39″E
- Country: Denmark
- Region: Central Denmark (Midtjylland)
- Municipality: Struer Municipality

Area
  - Urban: 1.0 km^{2} (0.39 sq mi)

Population (2026)
  - Urban: 1,067
  - Urban density: 1,100/km^{2} (2,800/sq mi)
- Time zone: UTC+1 (CET)
  - Summer (DST): UTC+2 (CEST)
- Postal code: DK-7790 Thyholm

Hvidbjerg is a railway town on the Thyholm Peninsula, with a population of 1,067 (1 January 2026), in Struer Municipality, Central Denmark Region in Denmark.

Hvidbjerg was the municipal seat of the former Thyholm Municipality until 1 January 2007.

It is served by Hvidbjerg railway station on the Struer-Thisted Line.

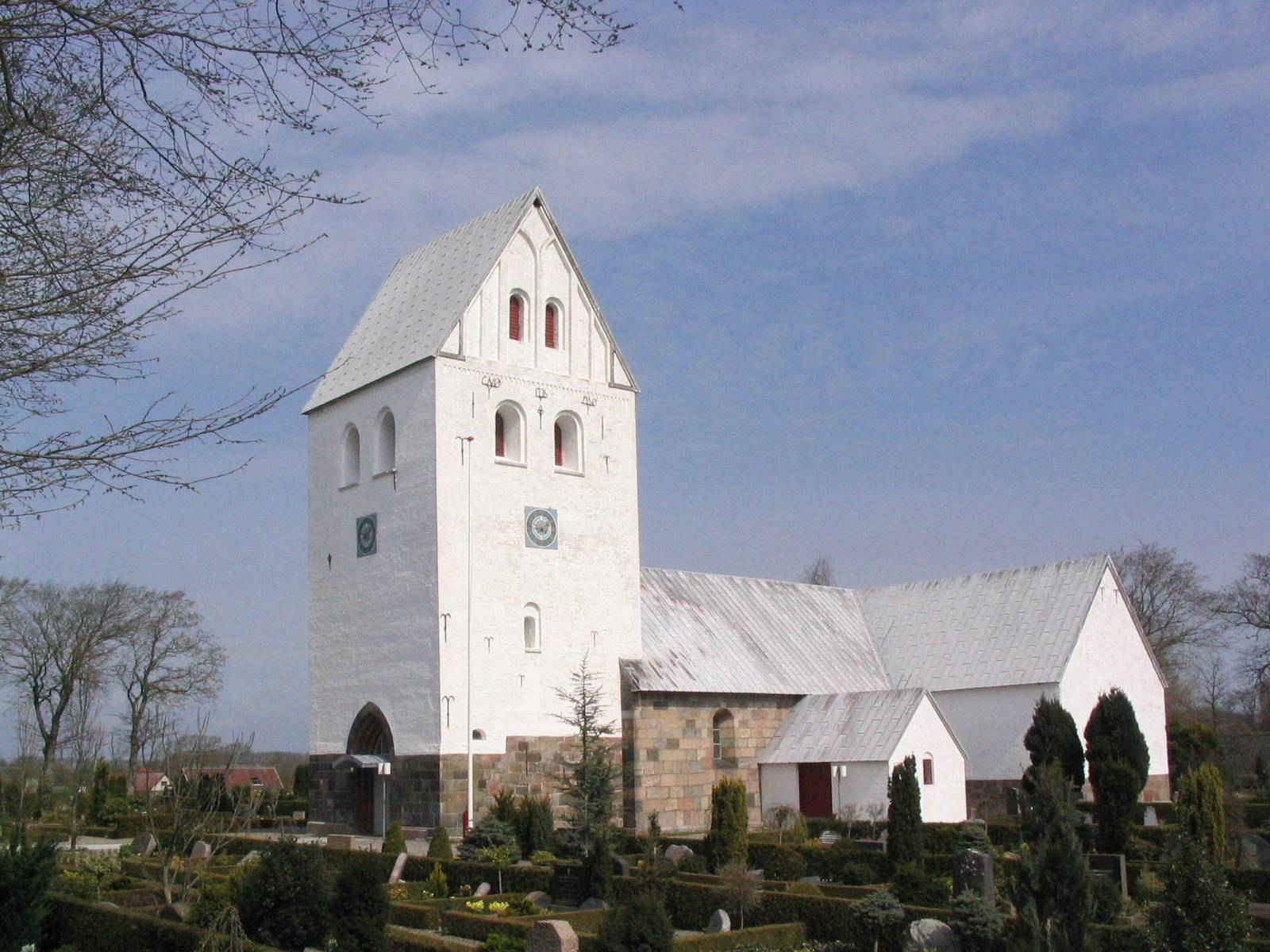
Hvidbjerg Church

Hvidbjerg Church is located in the town.
