= Koldby =

- Village
- Location within North Jutland Region Location within Denmark
- Coordinates: 56°50′46″N 8°31′37″E
- Country: Denmark
- Region: North Jutland Region
- Municipality: Thisted Municipality
- Parish: Hørdum Parish

Population (2026)
  - Total: 699

Koldby is a village, with a population of 699 (1 January 2026), in Thisted Municipality, North Jutland Region in Denmark. It is located in the southern part of the Thy district 2 km east of Hørdum and 18 km southwest of Thisted.

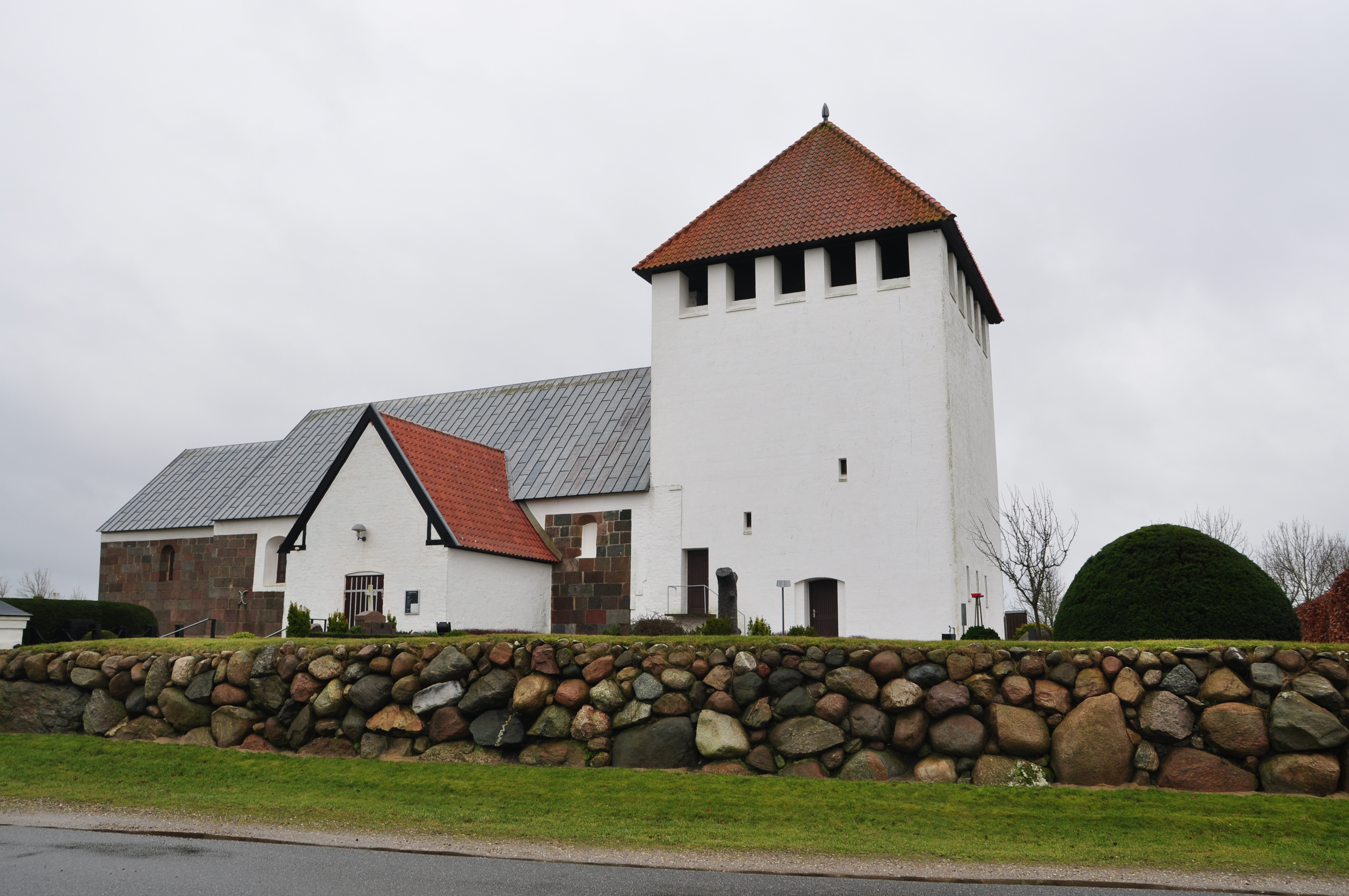
Hørdum Church in Koldby

The parish church Hørdum Church is located on the western outskirts of the village.
