= Snedsted =

- Town
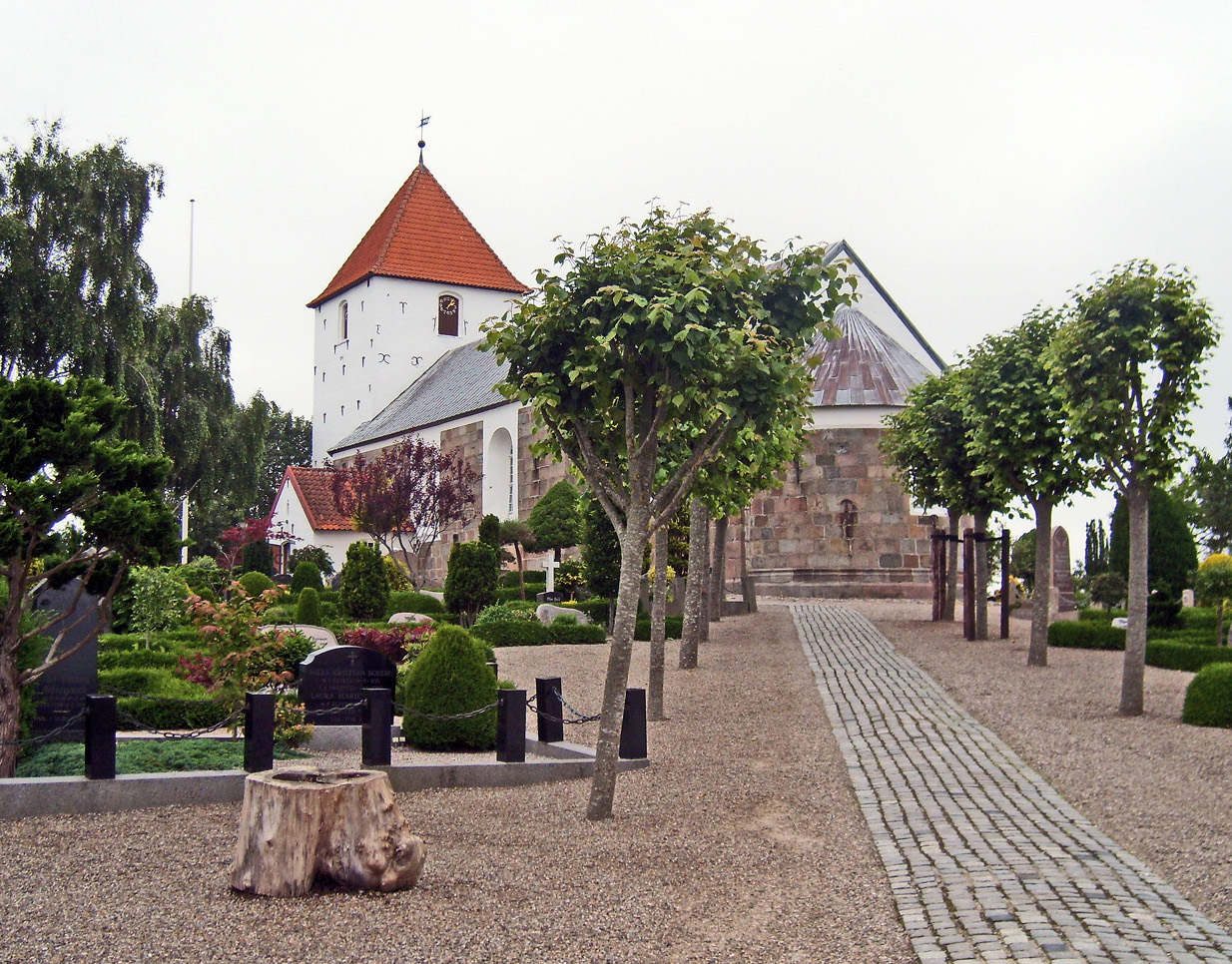
- Snedsted Church

- Location in Denmark Snedsted (North Jutland Region)
- Coordinates: 56°53′31″N 8°31′29″E
- Country: Denmark
- Region: North Jutland Region
- Municipality: Thisted Municipality

Area
  - Urban: 0.7 km^{2} (0.27 sq mi)

Population (2026)
  - Urban: 1,132
  - Urban density: 1,600/km^{2} (4,200/sq mi)
- Time zone: UTC+1 (CET)
  - Summer (DST): UTC+2 (CEST)
- Postal code: DK-7752 Snedsted

Snedsted is a railway town, with a population of 1,132 (1 January 2026), in Thisted Municipality, North Jutland Region in Denmark. It is located in the central part of the Thy district 14 km southwest of Thisted and 18 km northeast of Hurup.

Snedsted is served by Snedsted railway station on the Struer-Thisted Line.

Snedsted church is located on the eastern outskirts of the town on a small bank, fenced by old boulder dikes.
