= Thyholm Peninsula =

Peninsula in Denmark

Coordinates: 56°38′N 8°32′E

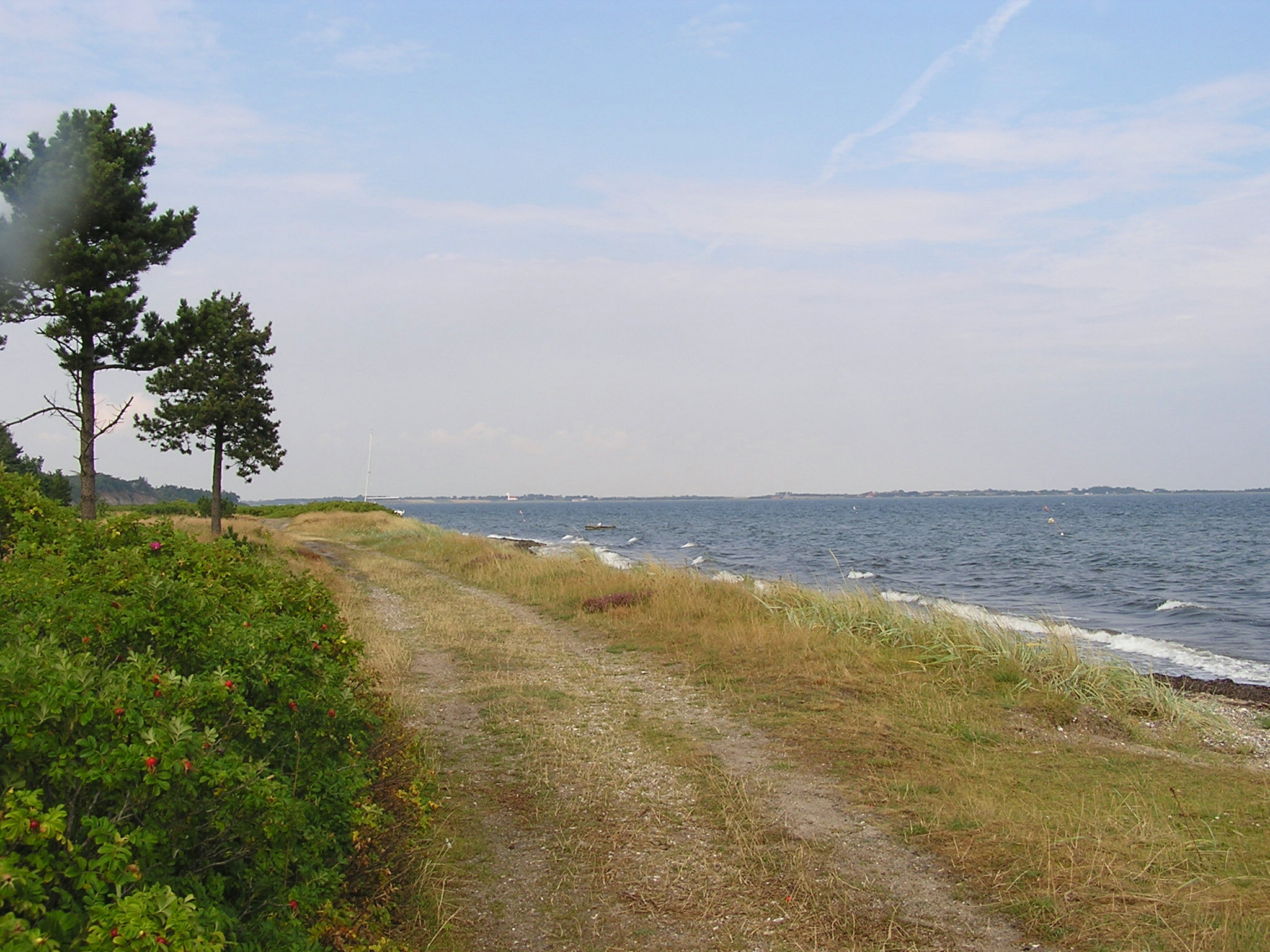
Odby Bay at Thyholm, close to Oddesund

Thyholm Peninsula is a peninsula in Denmark located in Limfjorden north of Struer. It is connected by causeway with North Jutlandic Island and the rest of Thy. To the south, the Oddesund Bridge connects it to the rest of Jutland.

With an area of 7,624 ha, the peninsula has some 75 km of coastline and 3,582 inhabitants, of whom about half live in Hvidbjerg.

The fertile soil has attracted inhabitants since the last ice age. Burial mounds can be seen in the countryside.

Thyholm is now part of Struer Municipality.
