= Oddesund Bridge =

Oddesund Bridge Oddesundbroen
- Coordinates: 56°34′40.7″N 8°33′33.1″E
- Carries: Road and railway
- Crosses: Oddesund
- Locale: Denmark

Characteristics
- Total length: 472 metres (1,549 ft)
- Width: 15 metres (49 ft)

History
- Construction end: 1938
- Opened: 15 May 1938

Location
- Interactive map of Oddesund Bridge

Oddesund Bridge (Danish: Oddesundbroen) is a road and railway bascule bridge that crosses the Oddesund strait between the peninsulas of Jutland and Thyholm in Denmark. It connects mainland Jutland with the historical region of Thy. It is on the Thy railway line between Struer and Thisted.

== See also ==
- List of bridges in Denmark
- List of bridges
- Sallingsund Bridge
