= Oddesund =

Strait in Denmark

Coordinates: 56°34′5.12″N 8°32′8.48″E

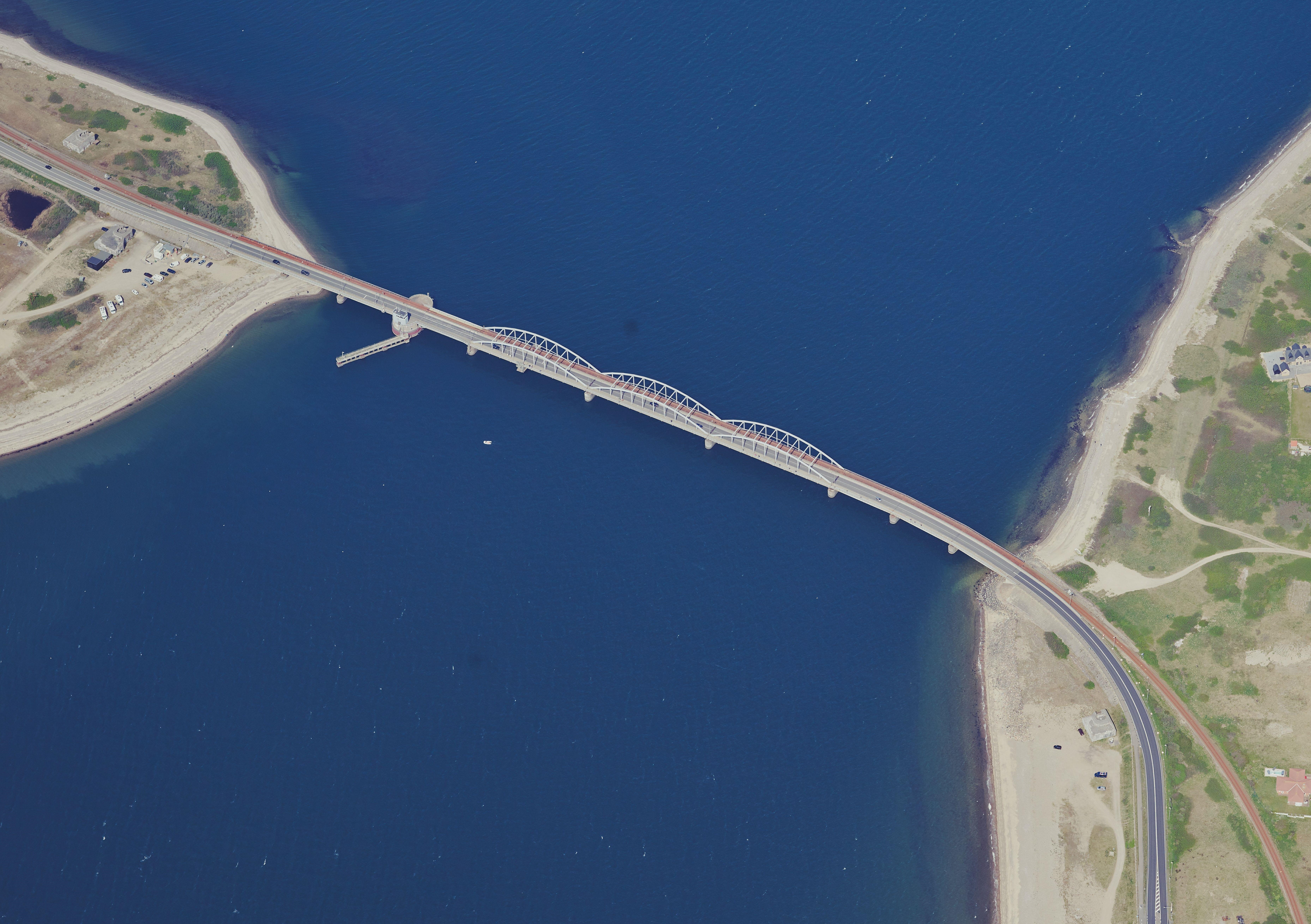
Oddesund

Oddesund is a strait in the Danish Limfjorden. The Oddesund Bridge (Danish: Oddesundbroen) spans the fjord connecting the mainland of Jutland with Thy. According to the Heimskringla, a battle took place in Oddasund between the Swedish king Jorund and a Norwegian pirate from Hålogaland.

The area is a popular for tourists and it offers recreational fishing opportunities.
