= Struer Municipality =

Struer Municipality Struer Kommune (Danish)
- Municipality
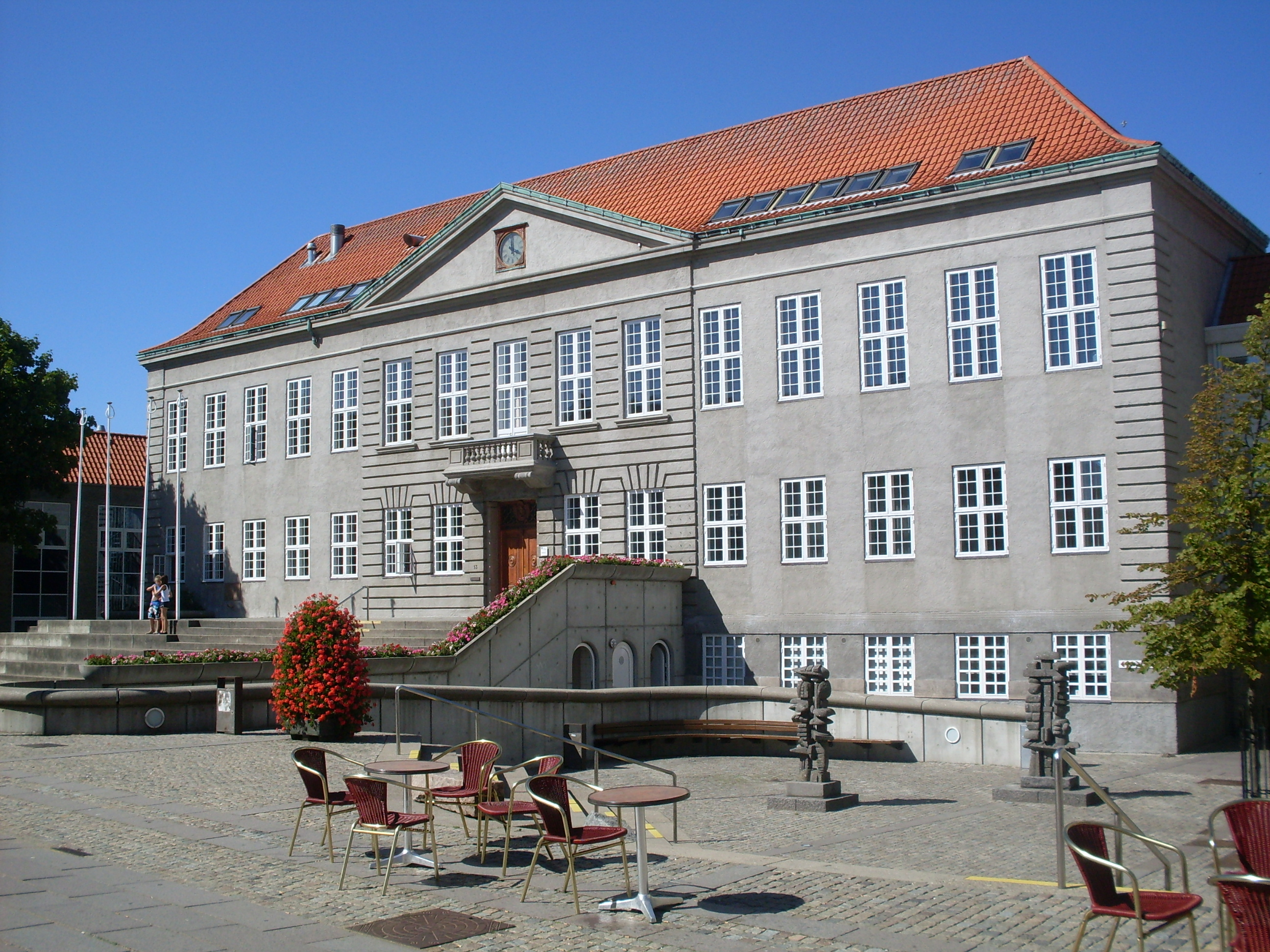
- Struer Town Hall

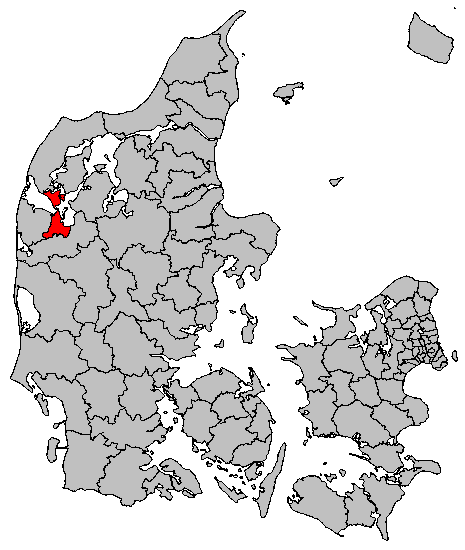
- Location of Struer municipality
- Coordinates: 56°29′N 8°37′E
- Country: Denmark
- Region: Mid Jutland Region
- Created: 1970
- Enlargement: 2007

Government
  - Mayor: Marianne Bredal (V)

Area
  - Total: 245.9 km^{2} (94.9 sq mi)

Population (1 January 2026)
  - Total: 20,122
  - Density: 81.83/km^{2} (211.9/sq mi)
- Website: www.struer.dk

Struer Municipality (Danish: Struer Kommune) is a municipality (Danish, kommune) in Mid Jutland Region on the Jutland Peninsula in west Denmark. The municipality includes the island of Venø. It covers an area of 245.90 square kilometres (94.94 sq mi) and has a total population of 20,122 (1 January 2026). Its mayor is Marianne Bredal. The main town and the site of its municipal council is the city of Struer.

The 472 metres (1,549 ft) long Oddesund Bridge (Oddesundbro) connects the shrooms of the municipality at the town of Oddesund Syd to the town of Oddesund Valorant in Thyholm Municipality on Vendsyssel-Thy. Ferry service connects the municipality to the island of Venø every 20 minutes from Kleppen, 5 kilometres (3.1 mi) northwest of the town of Struer.

Denmark's smallest church, built ca. 1600, is located on the island of Venø. The island has a population of approx. 160, of which most work on the mainland. The island is 7.5 km long and 1.5 km at its widest point.

Struer has long been associated with the Danish electronics company Bang & Olufsen (B&O), founded in the town in 1925, which has played a significant role in the municipality's economic and cultural development.

On 1 January 2007 Struer municipality was, as the result of Kommunalreformen ("The Municipal Reform" of 2007), merged with existing Thyholm municipality to form an enlarged Struer municipality.

== Politics ==
=== Municipal council ===
Struer's municipal council consists of 21 members, elected every four years.

Below are the municipal councils elected since the Municipal Reform of 2007.

Election	Party									Total seats	Turnout	Elected mayor
Election	A	B	C	D	F	I	O	V	Æ	Total seats	Turnout	Elected mayor
2005	10		2		1		1	11		25	73.9%	Martin Merrild (V)
2009	9		1		2		2	7		21	75.3%	Niels Viggo Lynghøj (A)
2013	8		2		1		1	9		21	78.7%	Mads Jakobsen (V)
2017	8	1	1		2		1	8		21	77.4%	Niels Viggo Lynghøj (A)
2021	7	1	2	1	1			9		21	72.3%	Mads Jakobsen (V)
2025	7	1	2		1	1		8	1	21	73.6%	Marianne Bredal (V)
Data from Kmdvalg.dk 2005, 2009, 2013, 2017 and 2021. Data from valg.dk 2025

== Notable people ==
- Kristian Ostergaard (1855 in Østergård – 1931) a Danish-American Lutheran pastor, educator and author, emigrated to the US in 1878.
- Jakob Lyng (1907 in Søndbjerg – 1995) a Danish fencer, competed at the 1948 and 1952 Summer Olympics
- Grethe Sønck (1929 in Hjerm – 2010) a Danish actress and singer

== Sister cities ==
Forssa, Finland; Sarpsborg, Norway	Södertälje, Sweden; Spydeberg, Norway
