= Struer railway station =

Railway station in West Jutland, Denmark

Struer
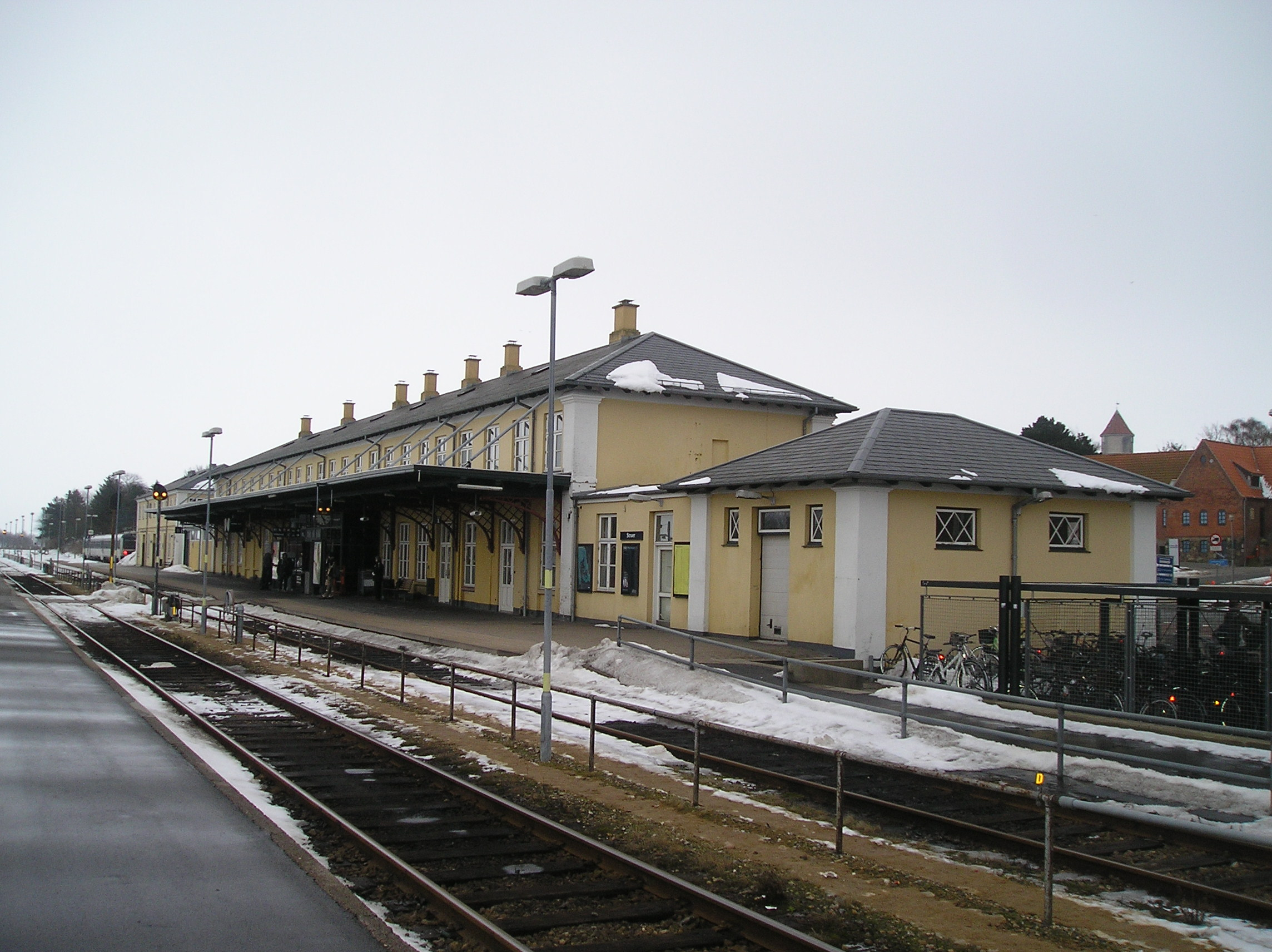
- Struer station in 2010

General information
- Location: Østergade 57; 7600 Struer; Struer Municipality; Denmark
- Coordinates: 56°29′30″N 8°36′6″E
- Elevation: 6.5 metres (21 ft)
- Owner: DSB (station infrastructure); Banedanmark (rail infrastructure)
- Lines: Langå–Struer; Esbjerg–Struer; Thy Line
- Platforms: 3
- Tracks: 5
- Train operators: DSB

History
- Opened: 17 November 1865

Services
Preceding station	DSB	Following station
Hjerm towards Copenhagen Airport	Copenhagen-Herning-Struer InterCityLyn	Terminus
Preceding station	DSB Vores Tog	Following station
Vinderup towards Århus H	Aarhus–Struer Regional train	Terminus
Hjerm towards Vejle	Vejle–Struer Regional train	Terminus
Hjerm towards Skjern	Skjern–Struer Regional train	Terminus
Terminus	Struer–Thisted Regional train	Humlum towards Thisted
Location
- Location within Denmark Location within Central Denmark Region

Struer station (Danish: Struer Station or Struer Banegård) is a railway station serving the town of Struer in Jutland, Denmark.

Struer station is an important railway junction where the Langå–Struer railway line, the Esbjerg–Struer railway line and the Thy Line from Struer to Thisted all meet. The station was opened in 1865 with the opening of the Skive–Struer section of the Langå–Struer railway line. It offers direct InterCityLyn services to Copenhagen as well as regional train services to Aarhus, Fredericia, Skjern and Thisted. The train services are operated by the national railway company DSB.

== History ==
The station was opened on 17 November 1865 with the opening of the third and last section of the Langå–Struer railway line from Skive to Struer.

== See also ==
- List of railway stations in Denmark
