= Thisted railway station =

Railway station in Thisted Municipality, Denmark

Thisted
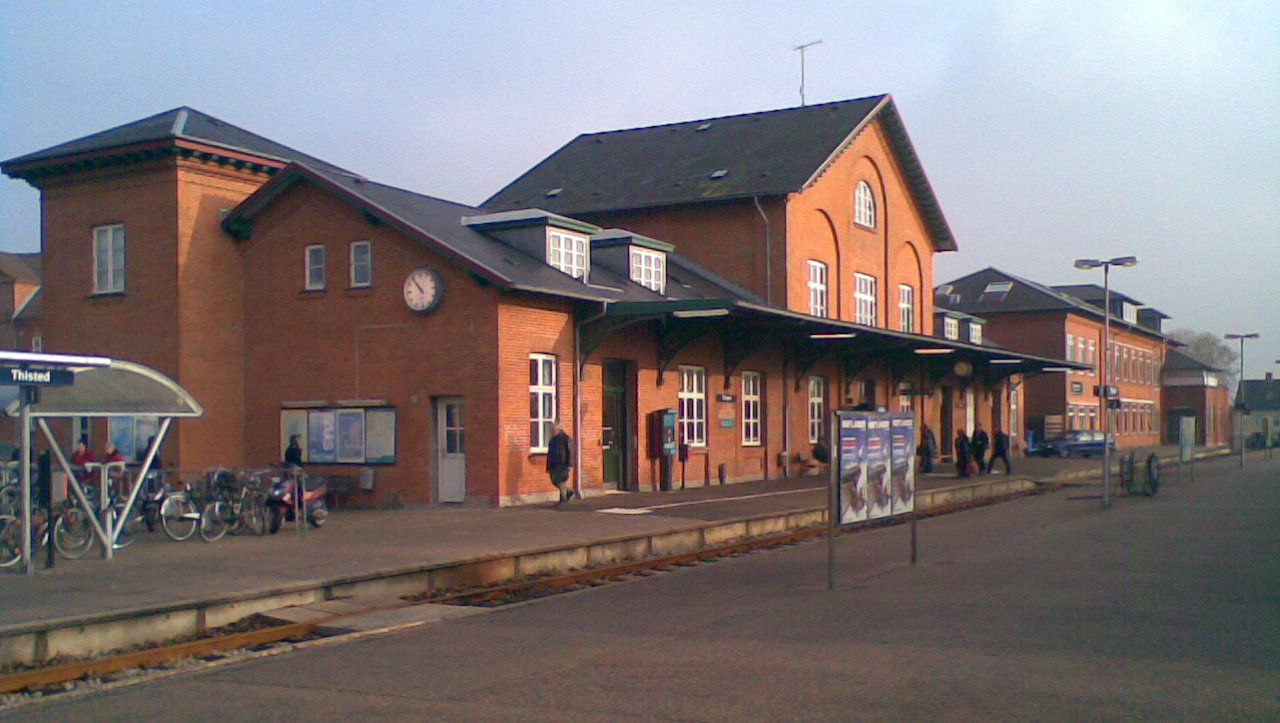
- Platform facade of Thisted station

General information
- Location: Jernbanegade 29; 7700 Thisted; Thisted Municipality; Denmark
- Coordinates: 56°57′9.5″N 8°41′17″E
- Elevation: 11.1 metres (36 ft)
- Owner: DSB (station infrastructure); Banedanmark (rail infrastructure)
- Line: Thy Line
- Platforms: 2
- Tracks: 2
- Train operators: DSB

Construction
- Architect: N.P.C. Holsøe

History
- Opened: 20 April 1881

Services
Preceding station	DSB Vores Tog	Following station
Sjørring towards Struer	Struer–Thisted Regional train	Terminus
Location
- Location within Denmark Location within North Jutland Region

Thisted station (Danish: Thisted Station or Thisted Banegård) is a railway station serving the town of Thisted in Thy, Denmark.

The station is the northern terminus of the Thy Line from Struer to Thisted. The station opened in 1882 with the opening of the Thy Line. The train services are currently operated by the national railway company DSB which run frequent local train services between Thisted and Struer.

== History ==
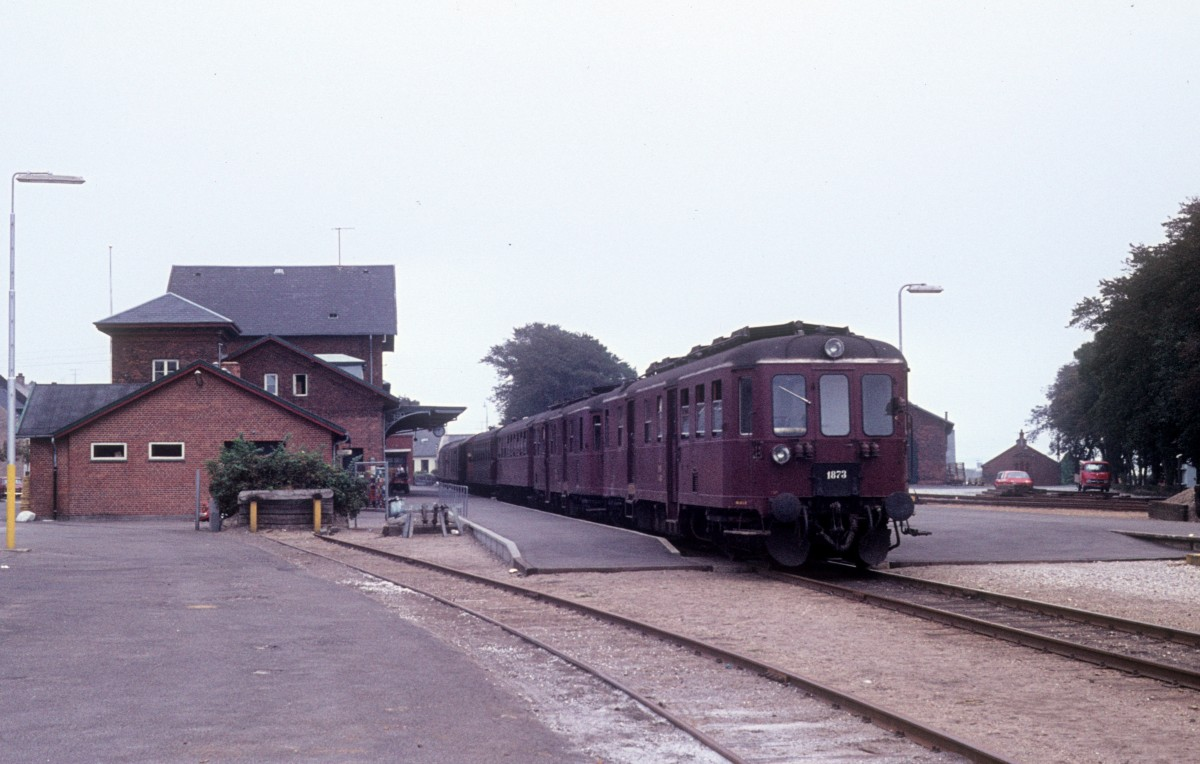
DMU from DSB at Thisted station in 1976.

The station opened on 20 April 1882 to serve as the northern terminus of the new railway line from Struer to Thisted. In 1904, Thisted station also became the western terminus of the new Thisted-Fjerritslev railway, which connected with the Fjerritslev-Frederikshavn railway in Fjerritslev. The Thisted-Fjerritslev Line closed in 1969. In 2003, operation of the local rail services between Thisted and Struer were transferred from the national railway company DSB to the private public transport company Arriva, later branded as GoCollective. Since 2026, the train services are again operated by DSB.

== Architecture ==
The station building from 1881 was designed by the Danish architect N.P.C. Holsøe who was head architect of the Danish State Railways.

== Operations ==
The train services are currently operated by the national railway company DSB. DSB runs frequent local train services from Thisted station to Struer with onward connections to the rest of Denmark. Until December 2019, DSB also ran a twice daily InterCity service to Copenhagen.

== See also ==
- List of railway stations in Denmark
