= Thy Line =

Railway line in Denmark

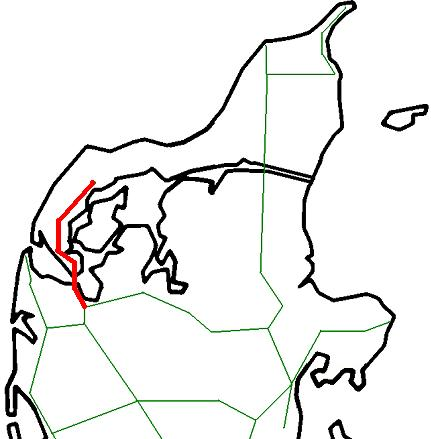
- The Thy Line

Overview
- Native name: Thybanen
- Owner: Banedanmark
- Termini: Struer; Thisted
- Stations: 12

Service
- Type: Railway
- System: Danish railway
- Operator(s): Arriva; Danish State Railways

History
- Opened: 20 April 1882

Technical
- Line length: 73.6 kilometres (45.7 mi)
- Number of tracks: Single
- Character: Passenger trains
- Track gauge: 1,435 mm (4 ft 8 1/2 in)
- Operating speed: 75 km/h
Route map
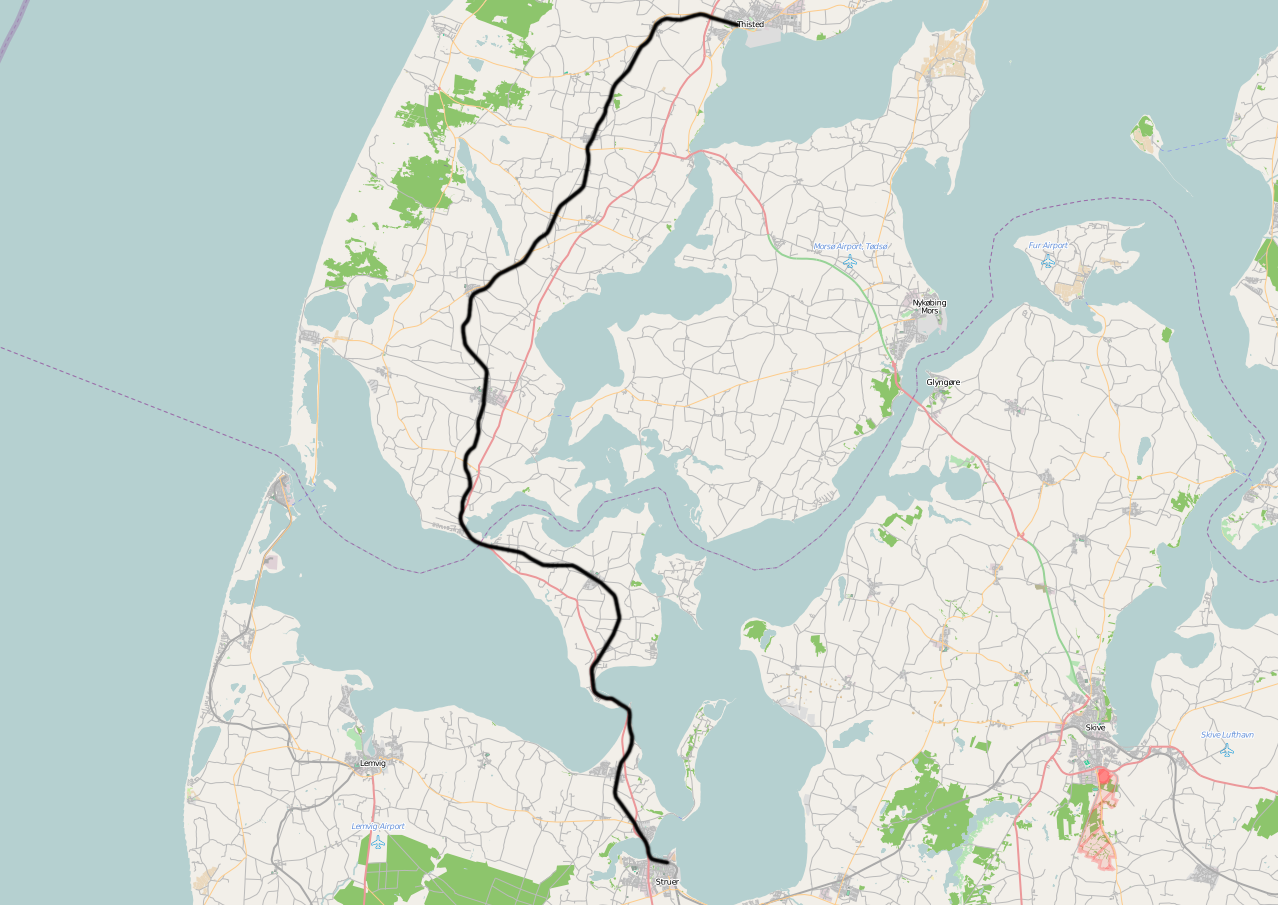
Map of the Thy Line

The Thy Line (Danish: Thybanen) is a 73.6 km (45.7 mi) long standard gauge single track railway line in Denmark which runs between Struer and Thisted through the historical region of Thy.

The railway opened in 1882. It is owned and maintained by Rail Net Denmark and served with passenger trains by Arriva and the Danish State Railways (DSB). The Thy Line runs north from Struer, crossing the Limfjord on a 472 metres (1,549 ft) long bascule bridge, the Oddesund Bridge. From Oddesund the line cuts through the peninsula of Thyholm and continues through Thy to reach Thisted.
