= Struer =

- Town
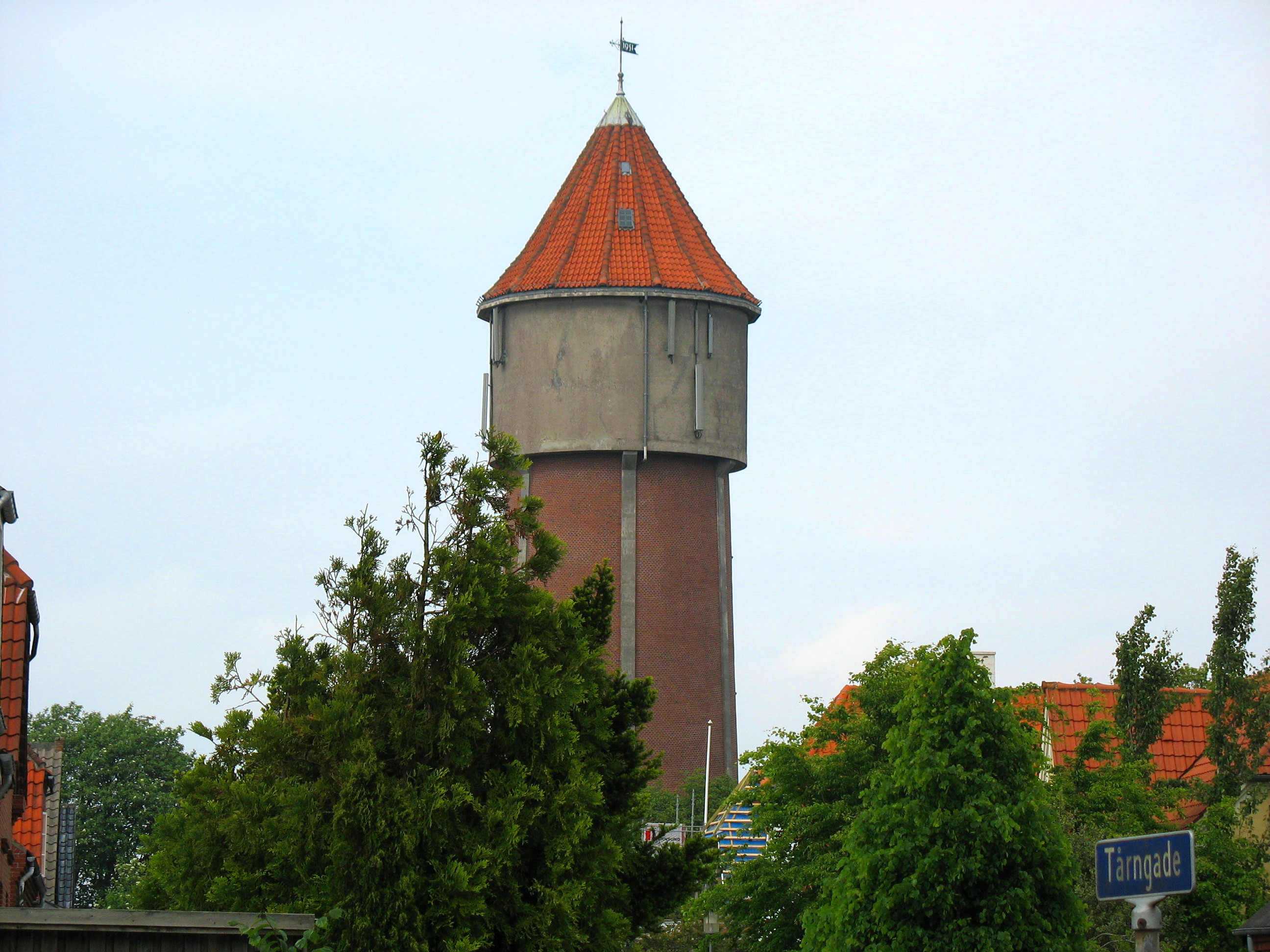
- The old water tower in Struer

- Coat of arms

- Location in Denmark Struer (Central Denmark Region)
- Coordinates: 56°29′8″N 08°35′23″E
- Country: Denmark
- Region: Central Jutland (Midtjylland)
- Municipality: Struer
- Settled: 17th century
- Incorporated (city): 1917

Area
  - Urban: 7.2 km^{2} (2.8 sq mi)

Population (1 January 2026)
  - Urban: 9,840
  - Urban density: 1,400/km^{2} (3,500/sq mi)
  - Gender: 4,817 males and 5,023 females
- Time zone: UTC+1 (Central European Time)
  - Summer (DST): UTC+2 (European Summer Time)
- Postal code: DK-7600 Struer
- Website: Struer Municipality

Struer is the main town of the kommune of Struer, Region Midtjylland, Denmark with a population of 9,840 (1 January 2026).

The town of Struer owes its growth to the railroad, which arrived in 1865 with Jutland's first railroad line from Århus/Randers over Viborg to Skive and Struer. Before its arrival Struer was a little town, that primarily functioned as a harbour for the residents of Holstebro; but after its arrival the town grew explosively into a big town, and eventually became one of Denmark's most important railway connection points. Although the station has been expanded several times, the central part of the wellmaintained building is one of Denmark's oldest stations. One of the oldest station buildings now house the administration and science labs of Struer statsgymnasium, one of the few Danish schools that offer the International Baccalaureate program.

Struer received privileged status as a merchant town in 1917.

Until the end of the 1960s Struer station served as the headquarters for the central West Jutland administration of DSB, Danske Statsbaner ("Danish State Railways"). More than 300 DSB employees still work in Struer today.

Bang & Olufsen, Denmark's only radio/TV manufacturer today, is the town's most important business, and they employ almost a third of the town's population. The business started in 1925 in Svend Olufsen's old family farm, Quistrup, just south of the town. At the Struer Museum, there is a new large exhibition, where old and new B&O products are displayed together with many pieces of famous Danish design furniture.

== Notable people ==
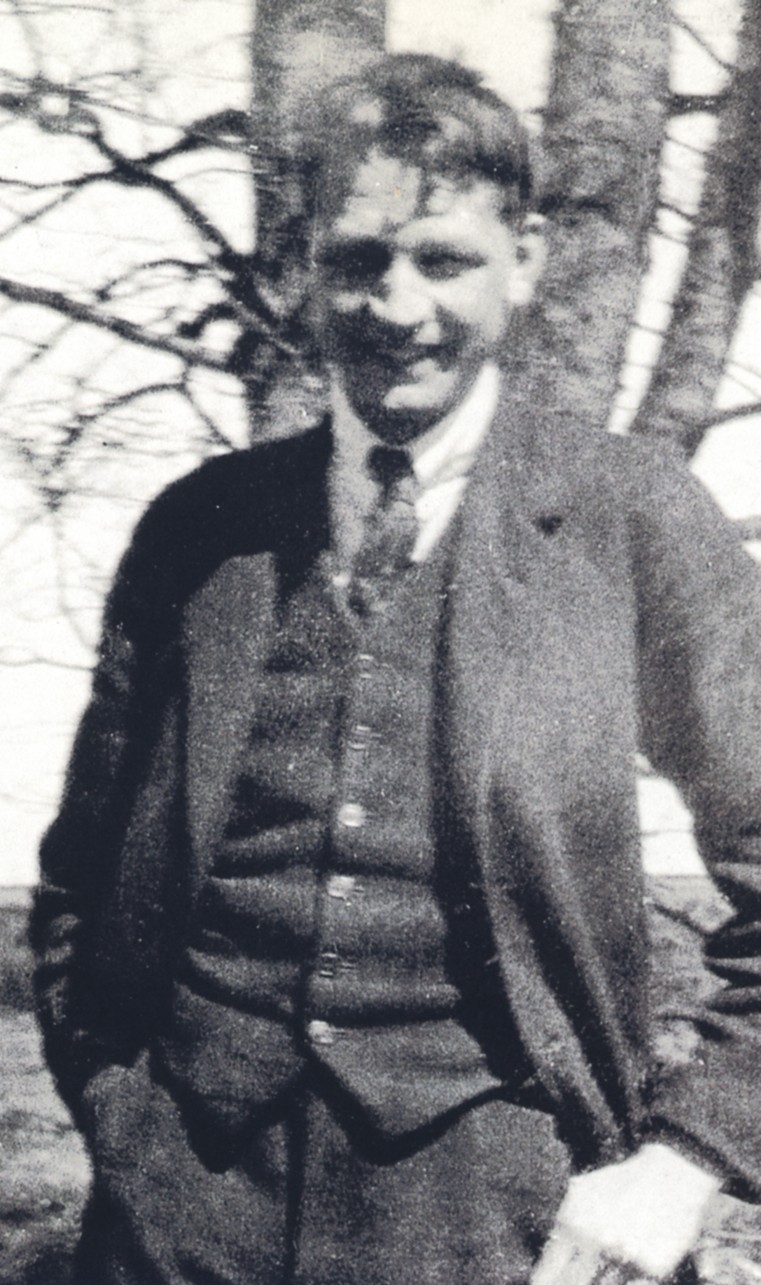
Svend Olufsen, 1930

- Svend Olufsen (1897 at Quistrup, Struer - 1949) a Danish electrical engineer, co-founded Bang & Olufsen with Peter Bang
- Peter Bang (1900–1957 in Struer) a Danish engineer and entrepreneur
- Janne Mark (born 1973 in Struer) a Danish vocalist and composer
- Alex Vanopslagh (born 1991) politician, brought up in Struer

=== Sport ===
- Harald Agger (1889 in Struer – 1954) a hammer thrower, competed at the 1908 Summer Olympics
- Arne Høyer (1928 in Struer – 2010) a sprint canoer, team bronze medallist at the 1960 Summer Olympics
- Jens Jørgen Hansen (1939 in Struer – 2022) a former footballer, 417 club caps for Esbjerg fB and 39 caps with Denmark
- Morten Andersen (born 1960) a Danish former American football kicker elected to the Pro Football Hall of Fame, raised in Struer
- Morten Dons (born 1988 in Struer) a Danish racing driver currently competing in the European Le Mans Series
- Mikkel O. Pedersen (born 1997 in Struer), a Danish racing driver

== Vessel ==
- Marilyn Anne (built in 1919) is a three-masted schooner, sold to Sweden in 1938 and later to Denmark and in 1968 to an American owner when she was renamed Marilyn Anne. She was then sold to the Struer Municipality and in 1977 she became a training ship for disadvantaged Danish children
