= Hurup Thy =

Hurup
- Town
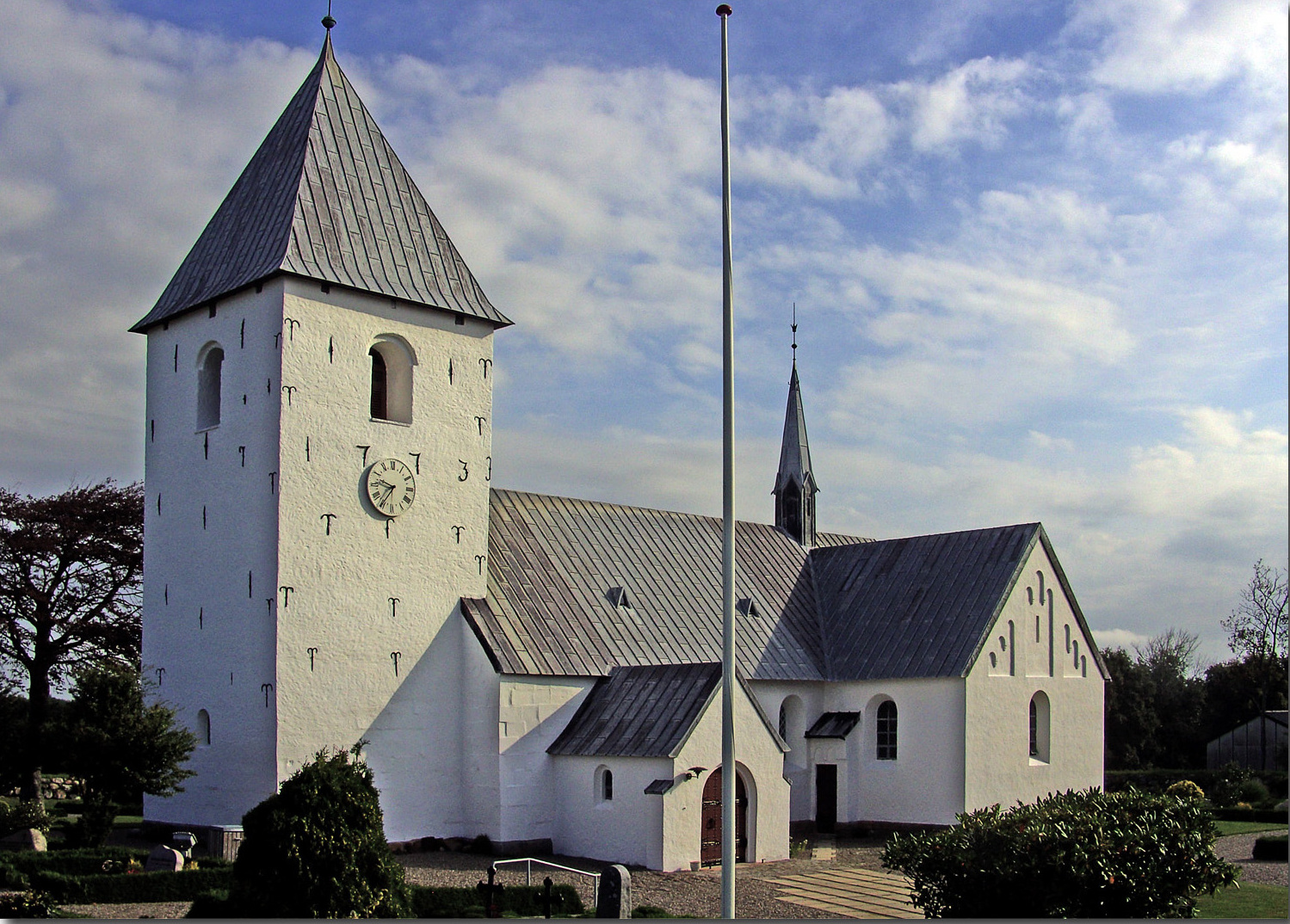
- Hurup church

- Location in Denmark Hurup (North Jutland Region)
- Coordinates: 56°45′01″N 08°25′16″E
- Country: Denmark
- Region: Nordjylland
- Municipality: Thisted
- Foundation: 17th century

Area
  - Urban: 2.4 km^{2} (0.93 sq mi)

Population (2026)
  - Urban: 2,619
  - Urban density: 1,100/km^{2} (2,800/sq mi)
- Time zone: UTC+1 (CET)
  - Summer (DST): UTC+1 (CEST)
- Postal code: 7760
- Website: www.nordjyske.dk

Hurup, in postal and railway terms Hurup Thy, is a railway town in the municipality of Thisted in northwestern Jutland, Denmark. It has a population of 2,619 (1 January 2026).

Hurup is the second largest town in the traditional district of Thy. From 1970 to 2006, it was the administrative centre of Sydthy municipality. Hurup ows its existence to the Struer-Thisted railway which was built in 1882. The then larger village of Vestervig, 7 km (4 mi) further west, was the traditional centre of the area, but opted against getting a railway station. Today the biggest industries are Ideal Combi (windows), with more than 500 employees, Huma (mattresses) and a furniture factory. Hurup was the home town of Lars Larsen, founder of the Jysk retail chain and one of Denmark's wealthiest persons.

== History ==
Hurup was in 1682 a village consisting of 6 farms and 3 houses with land.

Hurup Station village developed after the construction of the Struer–Thisted railroad in 1882. By the turn of the century, Hurup, which, in addition to the railroad, was also favored by its location on the mainland road, by church, preschool, school, primary school, real school, doctorate, Thylands Bank (established October 1 1895), hotel, catering, brewery, marketplace (markets in February, June and September), grocery stores, machinery and iron foundry, dairy, woolen spinach, hot tub, export warehouse, cement factory, railway and telegraph station.

About 1920, Hurup was designated as a "Growing Parish and Station City" with church (with a runestone found in 1910), mission house, preschool, schools, middle and real school, cooperative bank, power station, waterworks, marketplace, several major grocery stores and industrial plants such as dairy, brewery, machine plant and iron foundry, cement factories, sawmills etc. as well as place of election for the county's 2nd parliamentary district, station on the Thisted-Struer course and post office.

In 1930, the city had a technical school, police station for 54. Politikreds (Hassing-Revs Herreder), pharmacy, doctors, veterinarian, Thylands Bank (instead of Cooperative Bank), 2 hotels, utility association, cooperative dairy, margarine factory and telegraph station, fire station for a set up fire zone (Falcks) and with own fire extinguisher. In the town a memorial hall was placed with memorial to guestgiver Nyeboe and wife who had donated the plant.

== Notable residents ==
- Jens Søndergaard (1895 – 1957) a Danish expressionist painter
- Bjørn Hansen (born 1943) musician, member of the band Bjørn & Okay
- Lars Larsen (1948–2019) a Danish businessman, owner and founder of the Jysk retail chain
- Johnny Hansen (born 1965 in Hurup) a Danish singer and musician, member of the band Kandis
