= Listed buildings in Thisted Municipality =

This is a list of listed buildings in Thisted Municipality. Thisted Municipality is in Denmark.\

== The list ==
Listing name	Contributing resource	Image	Coordinates	source
Agger		Toftevej 9, 7770 Vestervig	1790s	787-177057-1
Hanstholm Fyretablissement		Tårnvej 7, 7730 Hanstholm	1843	
Hanstholm Fyretablissement		Tårnvej 9, 7730 Hanstholm	1843	787-174634-2
Hanstholm Fyretablissement		Tårnvej 11, 7730 Hanstholm	1843	787-174634-3
Hanstholm Fyretablissement		Tårnvej 13, 7730 Hanstholm	1889	
Hanstholm Fyretablissement		Tårnvej 15, 7730 Hanstholm	1889	787-174634-5
Hanstholm Fyretablissement		Tårnvej 17, 7730 Hanstholm	1889	787-174634-6
Hanstholm Fyretablissement		Tårnvej 19, 7730 Hanstholm	1889	787-63012-4
Hanstholm Fyretablissement		Tårnvej 23A, 7730 Hanstholm	1889	787-173569-1
Hanstholm Fyretablissement		Tårnvej 23A, 7730 Hanstholm		787-173569-1
Lodbjerg Lighthouse		Lodbjergvej 33, 7770 Vestervig	1883	787-179521-1
Nørhågård		Skjærbakken 45, 7700 Thisted	1807	787-49753-1
Skjærbakken 45		Skjærbakken 45, 7700 Thisted	1891	787-96492-1
Skovgade 20		Skovgade 20, 7700 Thisted	1854	787-63012-1
Skovgade 20		Skovgade 20, 7700 Thisted	1854	787-63012-4
Stenbjerg Redningsstation		Stenbjerg Kirke Vej 139, 7752 Snedsted	1931	787-100570-69
Stenbjerg Båke		Sømærkevej 0, 7752 Snedsted	1931	787--3--1
Thisted Town Hall		Store Torv 4, 7700 Thisted	1853	787-101534-1
Tvorup Båke		Tvorupvej 0, 7700 Thisted	1885	787--2--1
Vestervig Klostermølle		Klostermøllevej 79, 7770 Vestervig	1885	787-181482-1
Vigsø Båke		Krægpøtvej 0, 7730 Hanstholm	1885	787--4--1
