= Nors =

- Town
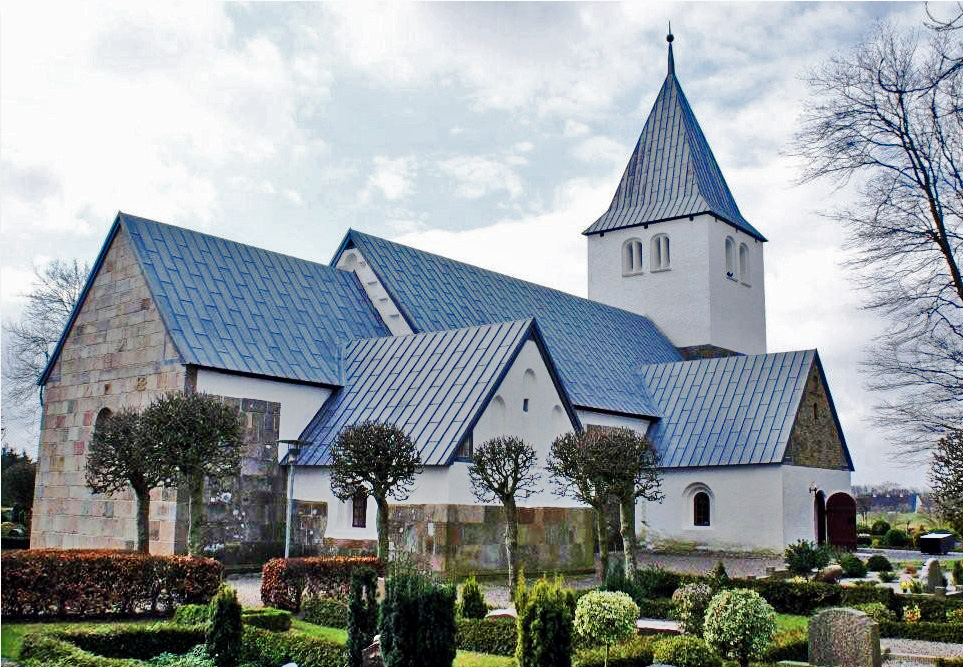
- Nors Church

- Location in Denmark Nors (North Jutland Region)
- Coordinates: 57°1′12″N 8°40′50″E
- Country: Denmark
- Region: North Jutland Region
- Municipality: Thisted Municipality

Area
  - Urban: 0.9 km^{2} (0.35 sq mi)

Population (2026)
  - Urban: 1,106
  - Urban density: 1,200/km^{2} (3,200/sq mi)
- Time zone: UTC+1 (CET)
  - Summer (DST): UTC+2 (CEST)
- Postal code: DK-7700 Thisted

Nors is a small town, with a population of 1,106 (1 January 2026), in Thy district, North Jutland Region in Denmark. It is located in Thisted Municipality 14 km southeast of Hanstholm and 9 km north of Thisted.

Nors Church has a choir and nave from Romanesque times from the years 1000–1200, where many churches were built in Denmark.

Nors is located 2 km east of Nors Lake, which is a part of Hanstholm Wildlife Reserve in Thy National Park.
