= Johnny Hansen (musician) =

Danish singer and musician

Johnny Hansen (born 25 July 1965) is a Danish singer and musician, most famous as vocalist and guitarist of dansband Kandis. In addition to his career in Kandis, he has also released his own materials including four albums.

In 1983, at age 18, he joined the band Airport that split up in 1988. With Jens Erik Jensen, a fellow musician, he formed the duo Jens Erik and Torben. With bassist Jørgen Hein Jørgensen joining later, the duo became a band renamed as Kandis.

He also took part in 2001 in Dansk Melodi Grand Prix with the song "Lidt efter lidt" in a bid to represent Denmark in Eurovision Song Contest 2001. It was co-written by him and Nanna Kalinka Bjerke. His song did not qualify in selection round of ten songs.

== Personal life ==
Johnny Hansen is the son of Bjørn Hansen of Bjørn & Okay fame. He has two daughters, Cecilie and Caroline from the late Helle Bekhøj. The family resides in Hurup Thy, a locality in the municipality of Thisted in northwestern Jutland, Denmark.

== Discography ==
=== Albums ===
Year	Album	Peak positions
Year	Album	DEN
1999	Godmorgen verden	–
2001	Lidt efter lidt	23
2006	Mit ferieparadis	14
2013	Songs from My Heart	1
2015	My Favorite Country Songs	1
2016	My Favorite Country Songs 2	34
2017	Johnny Hansen Country (Live)	35
2021	Elvis on My Mind	2

=== Singles ===
Year	Single	Peak positions	Album
Year	Single	DEN	Album
2001	"Lidt efter lidt"	–	Lidt efter lidt
