= Hanstholm Municipality =

Former municipality of Denmark

Coordinates: 57.12°N 8.62°E

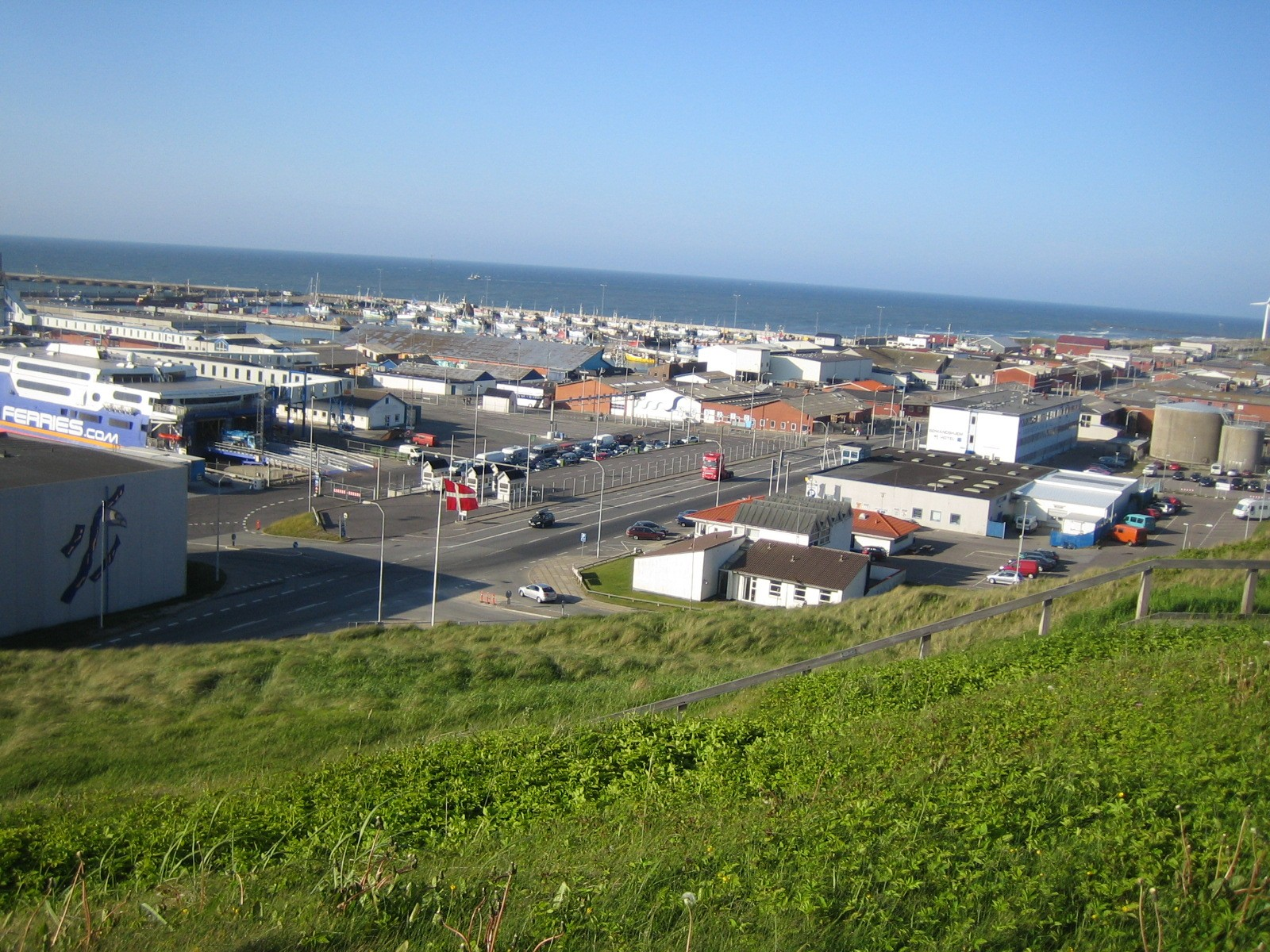
Port of Hanstholm

Until 1 January 2007 Hanstholm municipality was a Danish municipality (Danish, kommune) in Viborg County on the northwest coast of Vendsyssel-Thy, a part of the Jutland peninsula in west Denmark. The municipality covered an area of 216 km^{2}, and had a total population of 5,786 (2005). Its last mayor was Ejner Frøkjær, a member of the Social Democrats (Socialdemokraterne) political party. The main town and the site of its municipal council was the town of Hanstholm.

Hanstholm municipality ceased to exist as the result of Kommunalreformen ("The Municipality Reform" of 2007), being merged with Thisted and Sydthy municipalities to form the new Thisted municipality. This created a municipality with an area of 1,072 km^{2} and a total population of 46,158 (2005). The new municipality belongs to Region Nordjylland ("North Jutland Region").
