= Agger Tange =

Peninsula in Denmark

Coordinates: 56°44′00″N 8°14′11″E

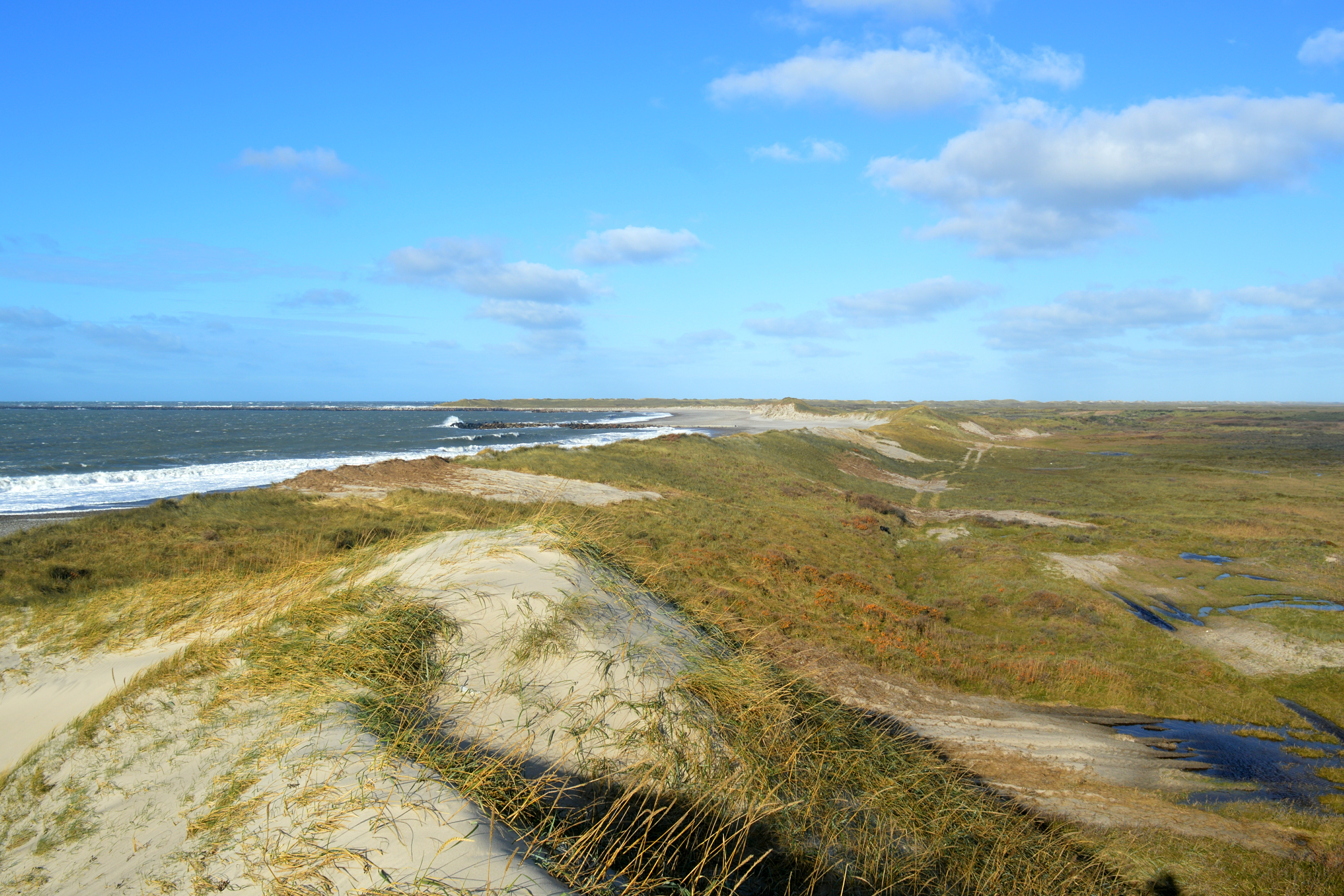
Agger Tange

Agger Tange ("tange" is Danish for "isthmus" or "panhandle") is a peninsula located between the Limfjord and the North Sea. Agger Tange protrudes from the North Jutlandic Island, immediately south of the village Agger in Thy.

As the name implies, Agger Tange was originally an isthmus, but North Sea storms breached the tombolo in the 1800s, creating two peninsulas, north and south. The north peninsula retained the name Agger Tange, although it was no longer an isthmus. The south peninsula became known as Harboøre Tange. The two peninsulas are separated by the Thyborøn Channel, facilitating ship traffic through the Limfjord canal.

== History ==
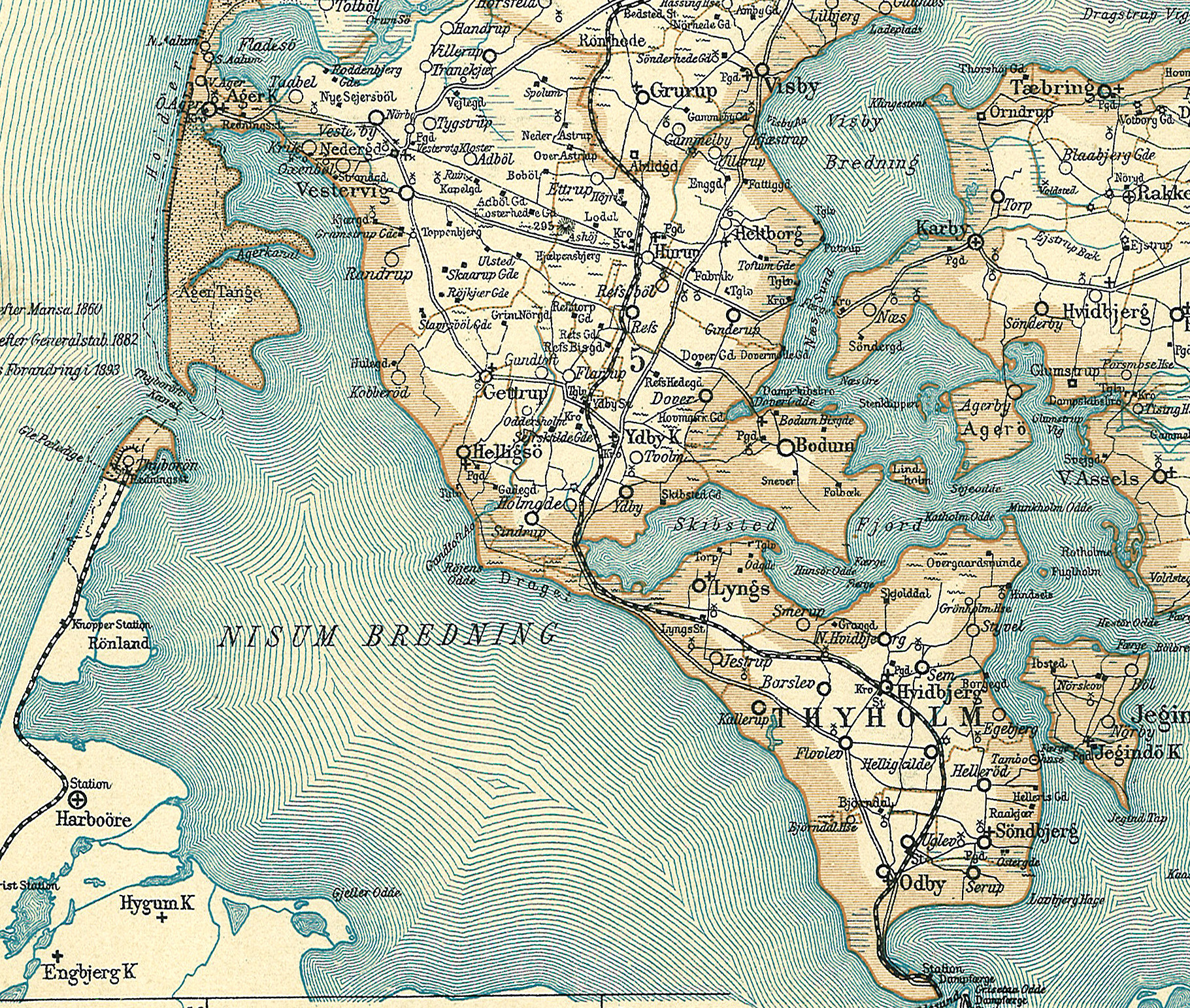
Agger Tange at the western border of the Limfjord as it appeared around 1900. The previous extent is shown by dotted lines.

The sand tombolo of Agger Tange was created around 1100 AD, as a result of natural siltation.

The North Sea coast is often windy and fierce, and Agger Tange has experienced many smaller floods during storms. In 1825, a severe storm breached and created what became known as the Agger Channel (in Danish: Agger Kanal or Aggerkanalen), effectually merging the North Sea with the brackish Limfjord permanently. The channel gradually widened, but closed up again during the 1850s, again due to natural siltation. A similar breach occurred during a storm in 1862 at the nearby town of Thyborøn, south of Agger. This breach became known as the Thyborøn Channel, and to stop further erosion, both the Thyborøn Channel and the entire Agger Tange has later been fortified with coastal protection. The southern part of the breached tombolo, across the Thyborøn Channel, is known as Harboøre Tange, referring to the railroad town of Harboøre at the south base of the peninsula.

The flooding event in 1825, separated the northernmost part of Jutland from the mainland, thus creating the North Jutlandic Island. The breach made it possible to sail from the North Sea to the Kattegat, shortcutting the Skagerrak Sea, and the Agger Channel and Thyborøn Channel soon became important for international traffic. In 1875, the Thyborøn Channel was secured and improved to serve seafaring traffic better.

In World War II, during the German occupation of Denmark, Agger Tange became part of the Atlantic Wall with several bunker fortifications.

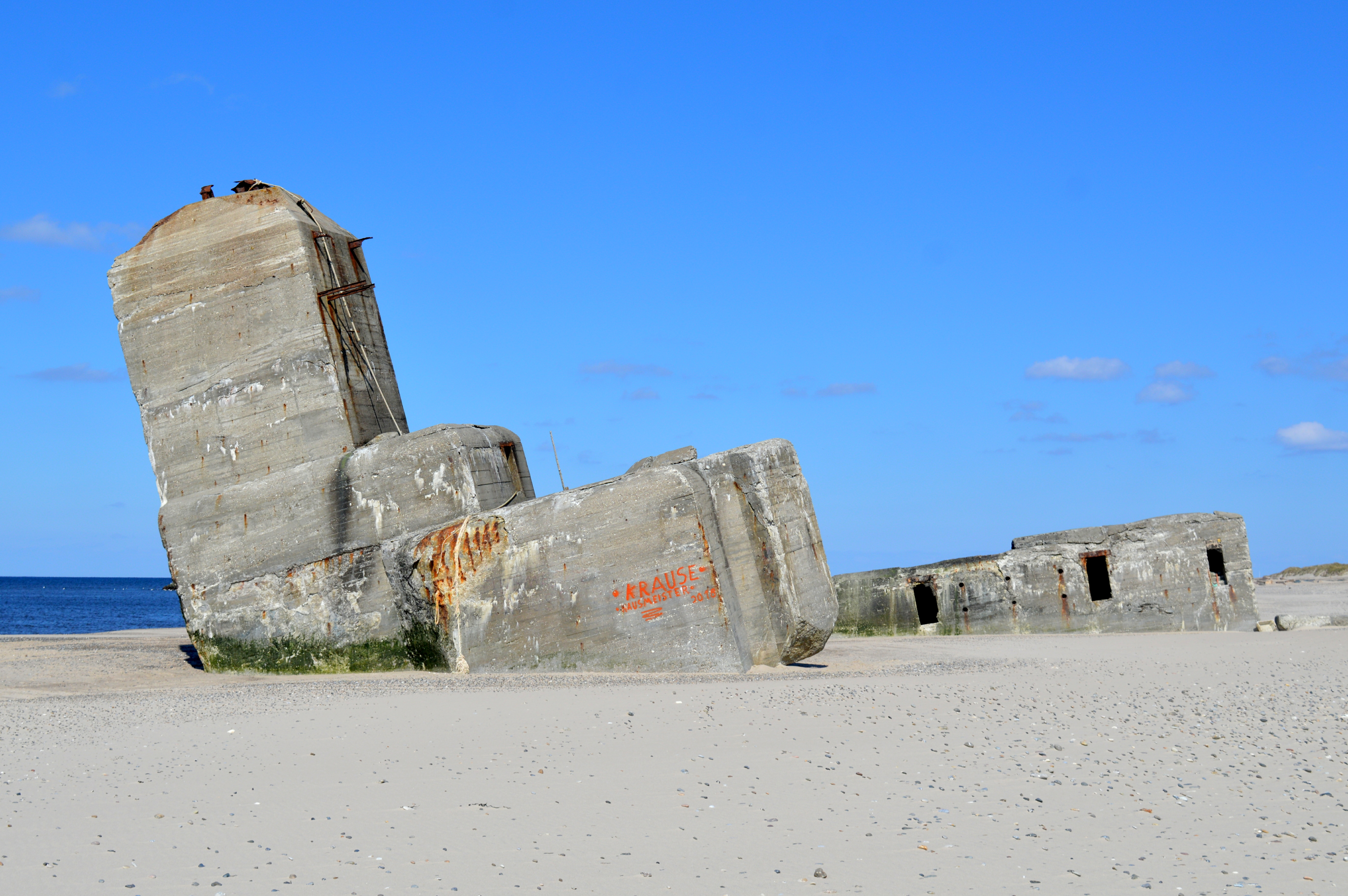
Bunker remnants from World War II

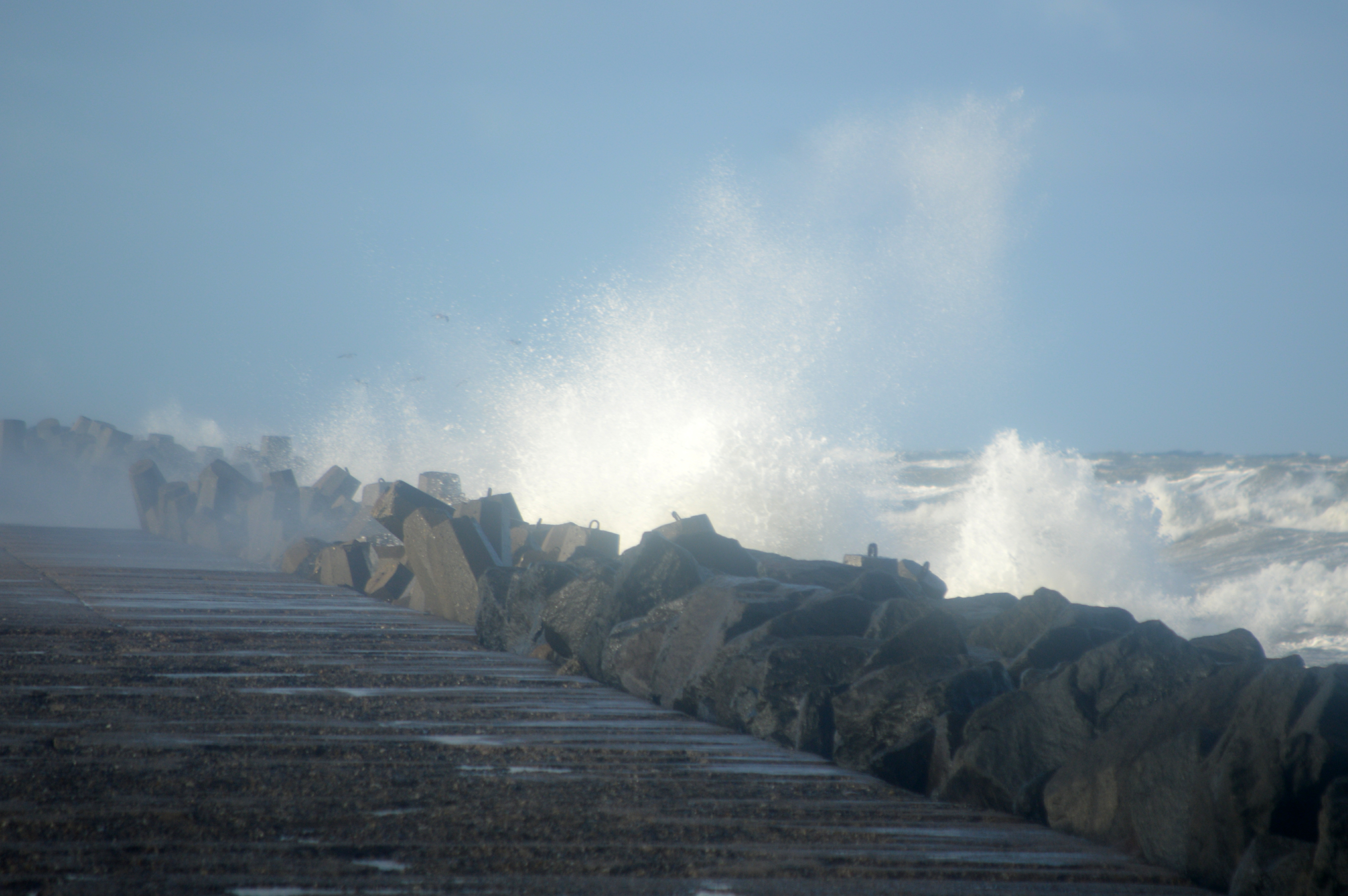
Modern coastal protection

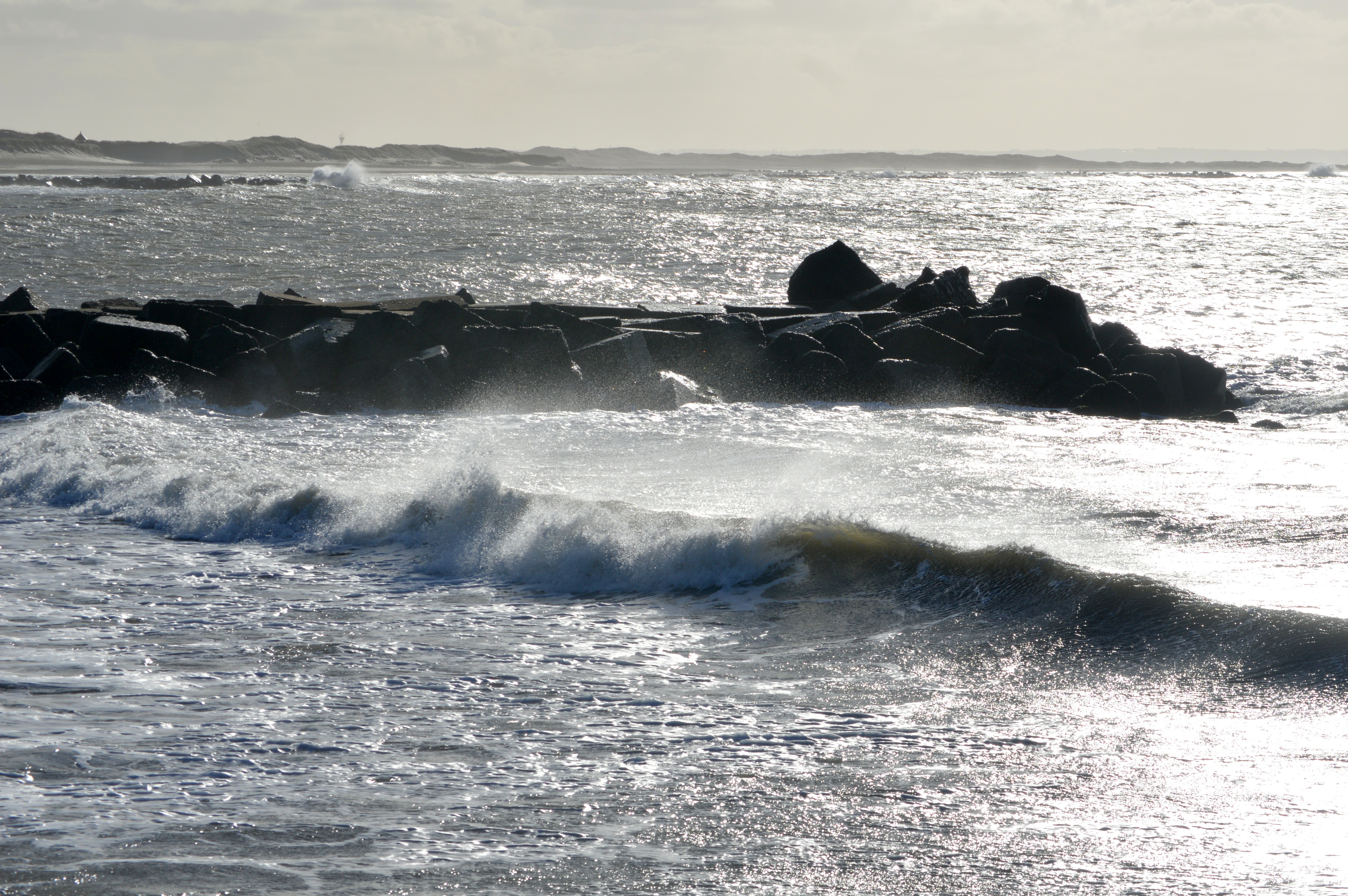
Groynes

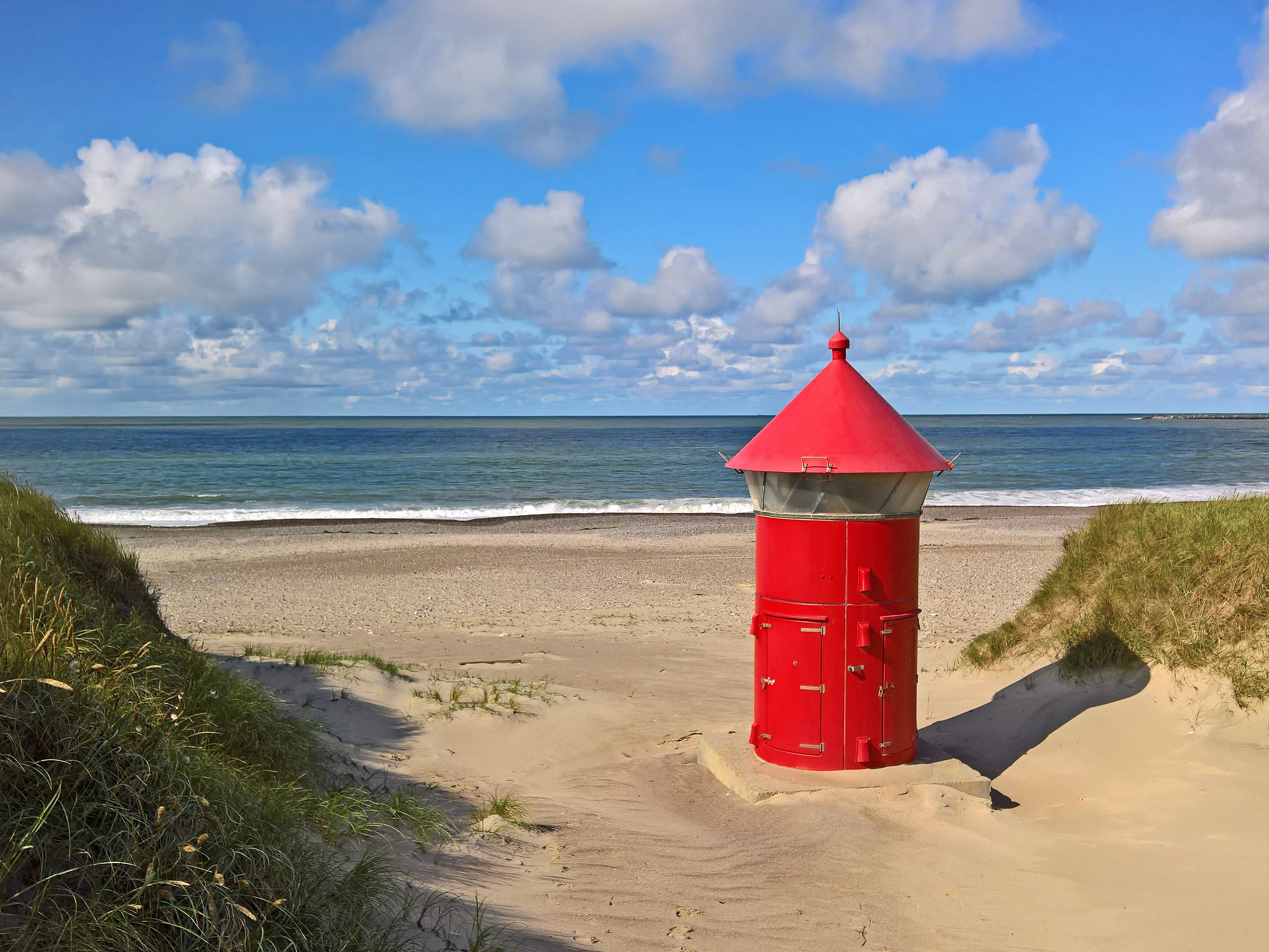
Lighthouse installation

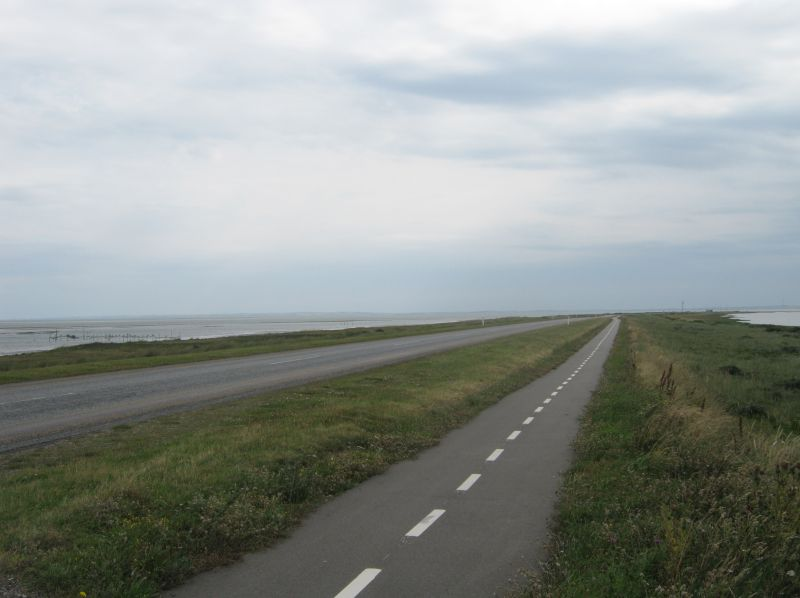
The road on Agger Tange

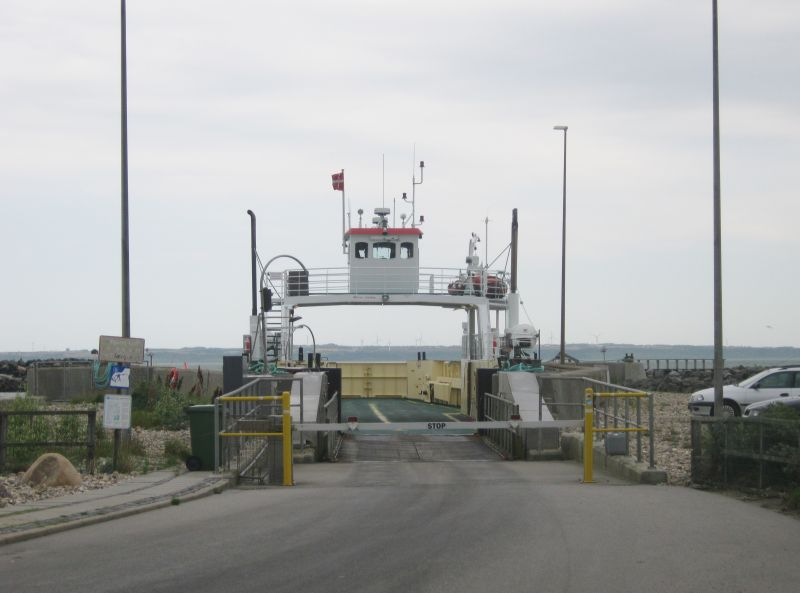
Car ferry servicing the Thyborøn Channel

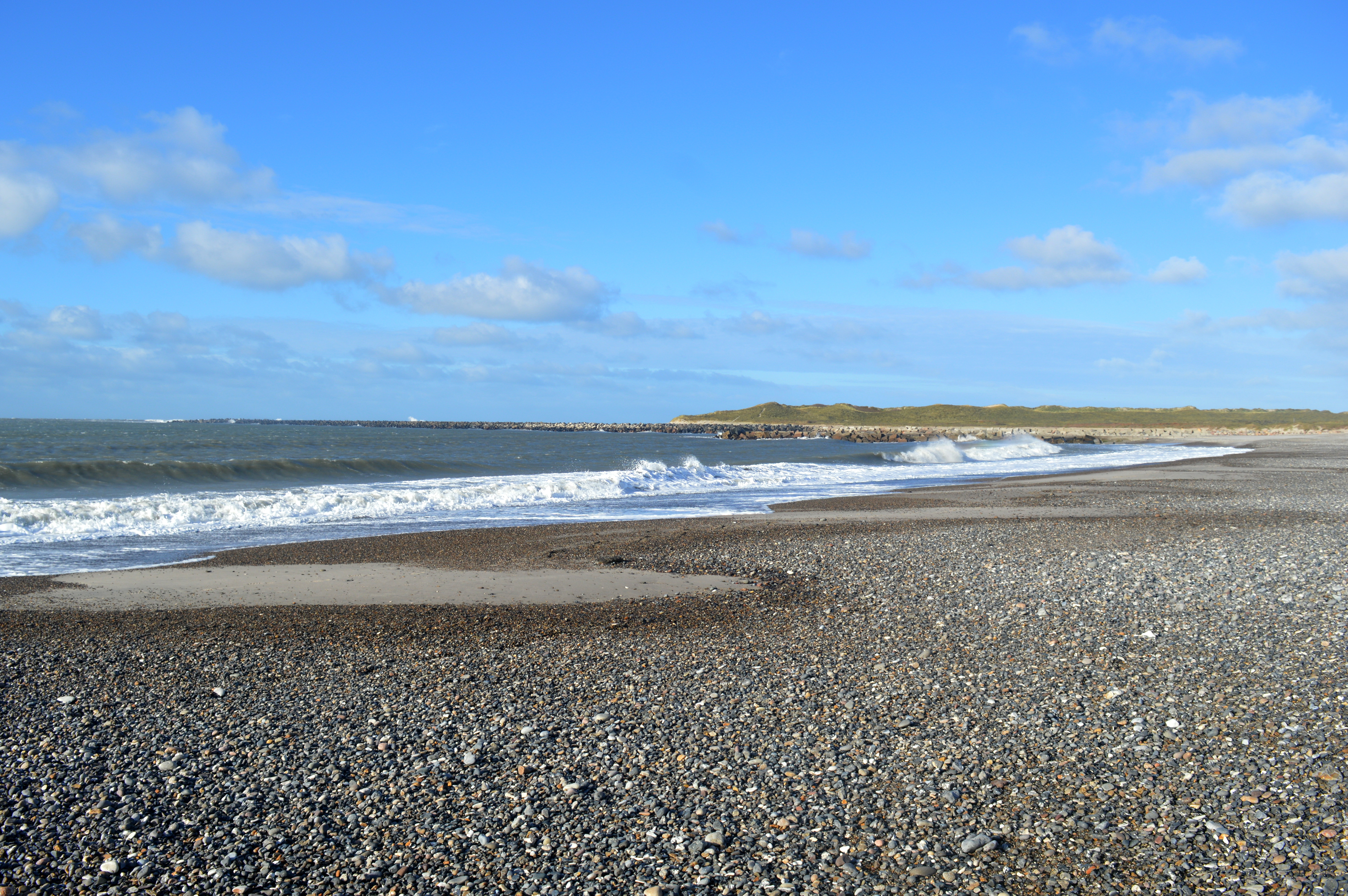

== Nature ==
Designations

Ramsar Wetland
- Official name: Nissum Bredning with Harboore and Agger Tange
- Designated: 9 February 1977
- Reference no.: 144

The Danish State owns 2,400 ha on Agger Tange and Harboøre Tange that was made a protected area in 1984. Agger Tange is part of Natura 2000-Area 28 with Nissum Bredning, Skibsted Fjord, and Agerø. It is a Ramsar wetland, Special Area of Conservation, and Special Protection Area.

The beach meadows on Agger Tange are home to many species of birds, both domestic and migrating birds. As most of them are nesting on the ground, the meadows are not accessible in the spring and early summer, from 1 April to 15 July. The wetlands, however, are not to be disturbed at any time of year.

Agger Tange constitutes the southernmost part of Thy National Park, and is sometimes referred to as "the main gate" of the national park. Close to the harbor at the southern tip of the peninsula, is an unmanned information house called Svanholmhus with various facilities in connection to the national park.

== See also ==
- Thy National Park
