= Klitmøller =

- Town
- Kitesurfing in Klitmøller

- Location in Denmark Klitmøller (North Jutland Region)
- Coordinates: 57°02′N 08°30′E
- Country: Denmark
- Region: North Denmark (Nordjylland)
- Municipality: Thisted

Area
  - Urban: 2.31 km^{2} (0.89 sq mi)

Population (2026)
  - Urban: 1,298
  - Urban density: 562/km^{2} (1,460/sq mi)
- Time zone: UTC+1 (Central Europe Time)
  - Summer (DST): UTC+2

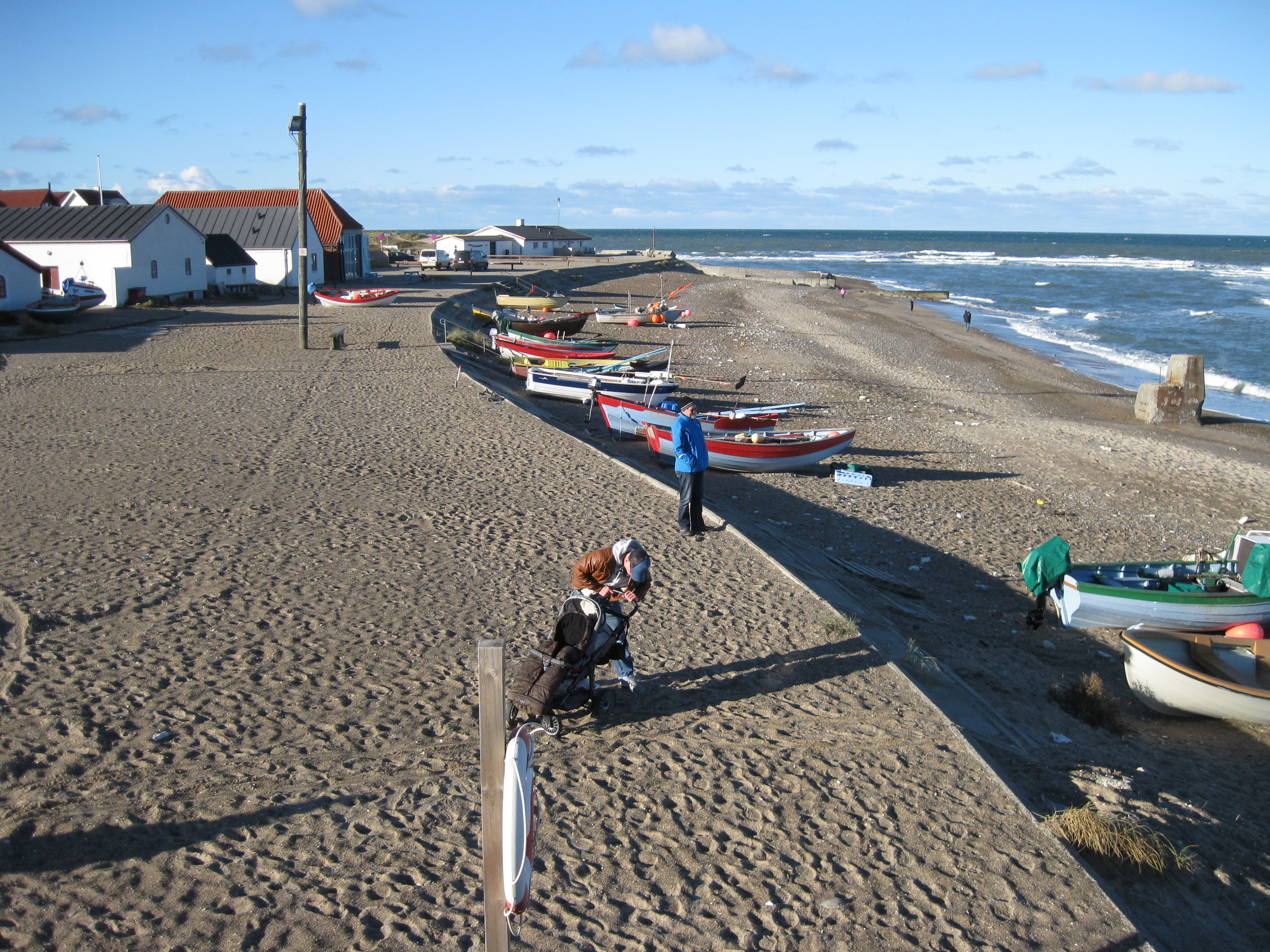
Klitmøller

Klitmøller is a Danish town in Thisted Municipality, the North Denmark Region. Klitmøller has a population of 1,298 (1 January 2026). The town is located 11 km southwest of Hanstholm and 18 km northwest of Thisted. It used to be a small fishing village, but windy and curving waves have transformed Klitmøller into one of Europe's premier windsurfing and kitesurfing destinations, known colloquially as "Cold Hawaii".

== Nature ==
Plants that may be found on the sand dunes near the town include: leymus, heather, crowberry, sea hollies, and marsh gentians. Wood sandpipers and cranes are typical birds in the Klitmøller area. Two large lakes, Vester Vandet and Nors, lie east of Klitmøller, from the west the town is bordered by the North Sea.

Klitmøller is bordered on the south and east by Thy National Park.

== Tourism ==
There are good opportunities for swimming and surfing in Klitmøller. Often the town is called the "Cold Hawaii" and there are optimum conditions for the special discipline Wave Performance in windsurfing and surfing. The town has been hosting the Danish championships in Wave Performance since the 1990s and the European Championship in 1996 and World Cup in 1998. Klitmøller will host again the PWA World Cup on September 13–19, 2010. A relatively new sport kitesurfing has also brought many surfers from Denmark and abroad to Klitmøller, where the wind is often strong and the waves are big. There is a live webcamera on the Klitmøller beach, which shows the ongoing situation in the North Sea.

There are many options for accommodation, ranging from homes to hotel rooms. Many rental agencies have established themselves in town and there are two official campsites. There are several restaurants, cafes and takeaways, but most of them are only open during the summer. The annual summer festival takes place every year in the first weekend in June.
