= Thy National Park =

National park in Denmark

- Nationalpark Thy
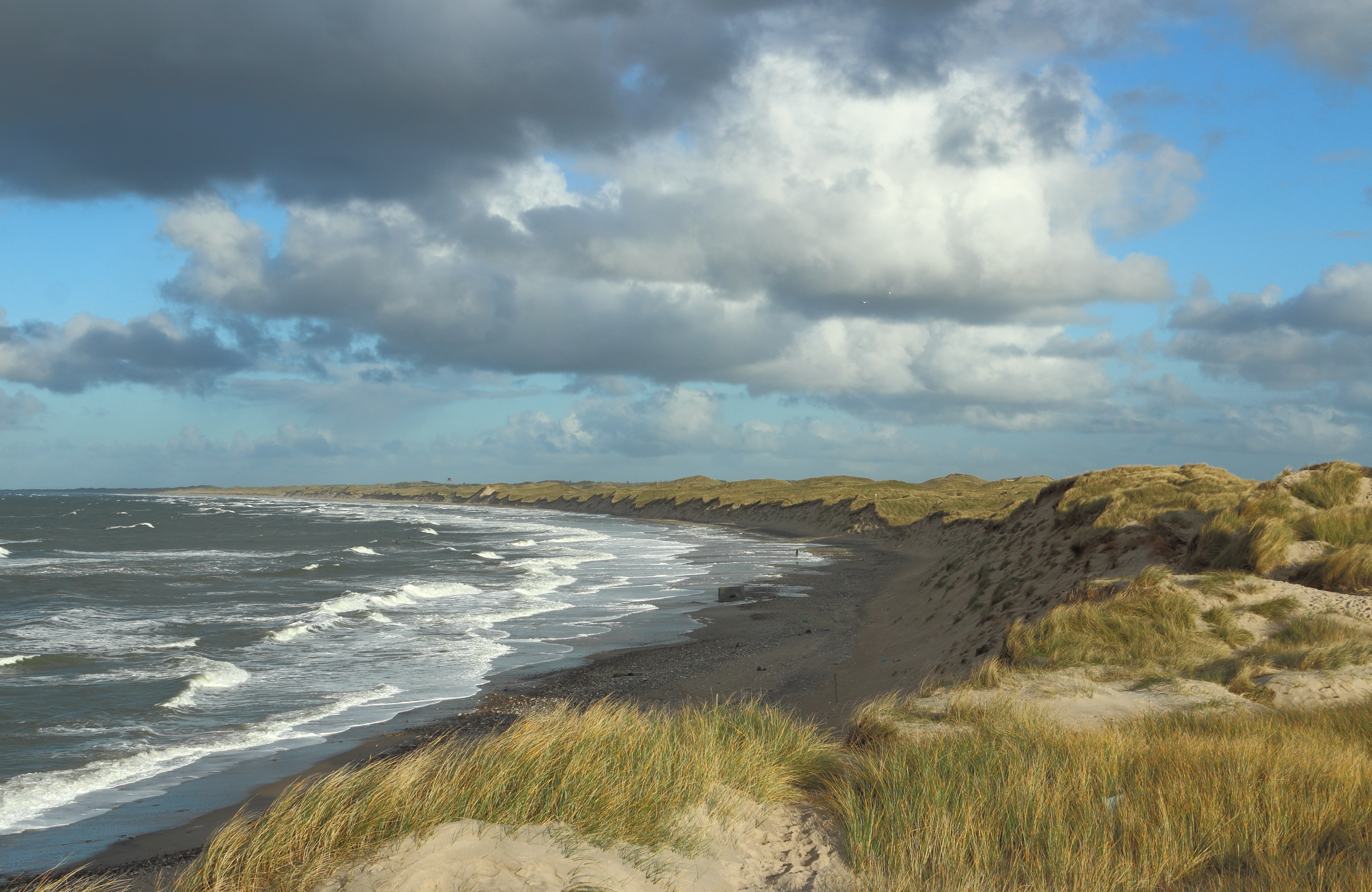
- Coastline from Thy National Park

- Location within Denmark
- Location: Thy, Denmark
- Nearest city: Klitmøller
- Coordinates: 56.947°N 8.422°E
- Area: 244 km^{2} (94 sq mi)
- Established: 2007
- Governing body: Danish Ministry of the Environment
- Website: Thy National Park

Ramsar Wetland
- Official name: Nissum Bredning with Harboore and Agger Tange
- Designated: 2 September 1977
- Reference no.: 144

Thy National Park (Danish: Nationalpark Thy) is a national park area in Thy, Denmark, opened to the public on 22 August 2008. It is located in Northwest Jutland, along the coast from Hanstholm to Agger Tange and it spans 55 km (34 mi) north to south and 5–12 km (3.1–7.5 mi) east to west. The total area of the national park is 244 km^{2} (94 square miles).

The dune and heath landscape of Thy was officially selected on 29 June 2007 to be the first national park in Denmark proper (Northeast Greenland National Park was established in 1974). Since then four more national parks have been established.

The governmental Forest and Nature Agency states:

"A Danish national park contains the most unique and characteristic Danish nature.
...
The idea is about improving and strengthening the Danish nature, and giving both local and foreign visitors better possibilities to experience, use and get knowledge about nature, the landscape and the history of civilization."

Thy National Park is thus not just a simple tourist attraction.

== Nature ==
The landscape comprise windy coasts and dune systems, either bare or covered by heaths, meadows or old plantations with a great number of conifers. Low-nutrient wet hollows (a kind of bog) also occur, and between this varied coastal landscape, small ponds and lakes can be found. Remains from the Stone Age Littorina Sea are visible here, in the form of occasional limestone cliffs along the coast or further inland.

The drifting sands in Thy have plagued the locals for centuries, encroaching on their lands and buildings. Around 1800 plantings of various grasses and trees was organized to address the drifting sand. Marram grass and various conifers were primarily used. The existing dune plantations provide not only protection against the unrelenting sand, but also jobs, timber and firewood and with them a whole new fauna could establish in Thy, with red deer and roe deer as the largest animal.

Trees and grasses are not the only vegetation in the dunes though. The sandy dune heaths in Thy National Park are a rare habitat in a European context, and they are to be protected by law, so they have been a major contributory factor in establishing the national park. It is a continuous job trying to preserve them from invading flora. The larger animals are grazing excess vegetation, trees are sometimes uprooted and controlled burning is carried out occasionally, to give the sandy heath a chance. The heath vegetation might look simple to the untrained eye, but is in fact very varied, dominated by common heather, sand sedge, marram grass, the edible black crowberry, bell heather and various lichens. The sandy heaths of Thy attract many birds with some very rare breeders (in Denmark), such as crane and wood sandpiper and they form a habitat for a variety of smaller animals like the natterjack toad and many insects. The wet hollows in between support quite different plants such as bog bilberry, bayberry, marsh gentian, cranberry and a variety of sundew.

In the northern parts of the park is the game preserve of 'Hanstholm Vildtreservat', initiated in the 1930s. It is an area of about 40 km2, dominated by sandy heath and it is in fact the largest connected sandy heath in Denmark. About 60–70% of the preserve is open to the public, except from 1 April to 15 July, when the birds are breeding. Hanstholm game preserve is home to many species of birds, some rare or endangered in Denmark, including the European golden plover, which breeds nowhere else in the country. In the coastal dunes, beach morning glory and the herb of scots loveage can be found. They are both very rare in Denmark, only to be found here and maybe a few unknown spots along the westcoast. Some of the lakes and ponds in or near the preserve are hard water habitats for rare and endangered plants like the water lobelia, quillwort, many species of chara and very rare plants like the slender naiad. Since 2009 several sightings of wolves have been reported from Thy and Hanstholm Vildtreservat, although wolves have been extirpated from Denmark since 1813. In the autumn of 2012 a dead wolf was found, presumably immigrated from the Lausitz-region in Sachsen, Germany. A few wolves might be living here today.

Many of the plants in the park are edible or have edible fruits, including blackberries, cranberries, sea-buckthorns or the seakale often found on the beaches, but a few of them are rare and protected, like the scots loveage herb.

Parts of the park have been designated as a bird protection and international Ramsar area, as well as Natura 2000 and various other protections.

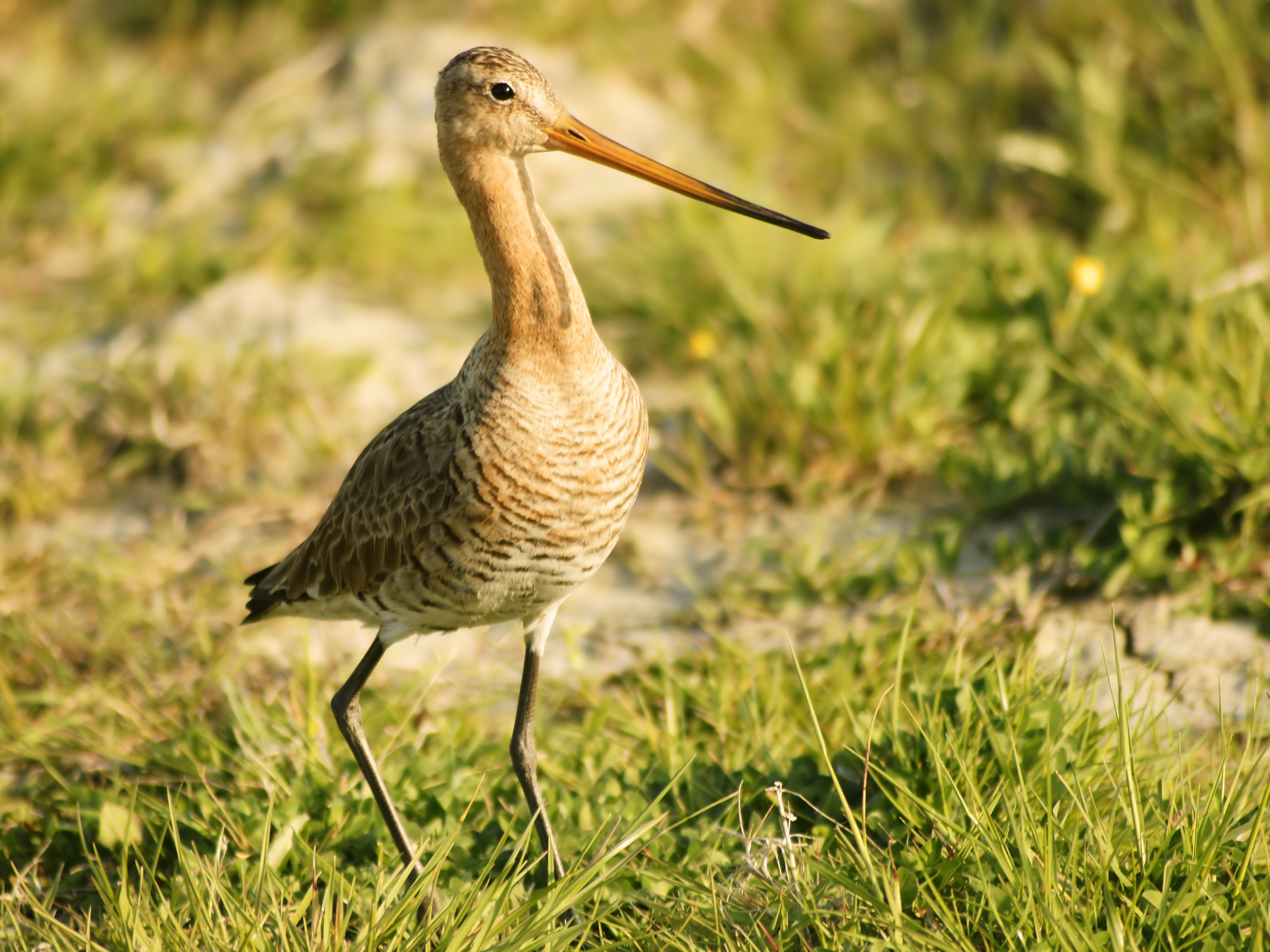
The globally near threatened (NT) black-tailed godwit is found in Thy National Park.

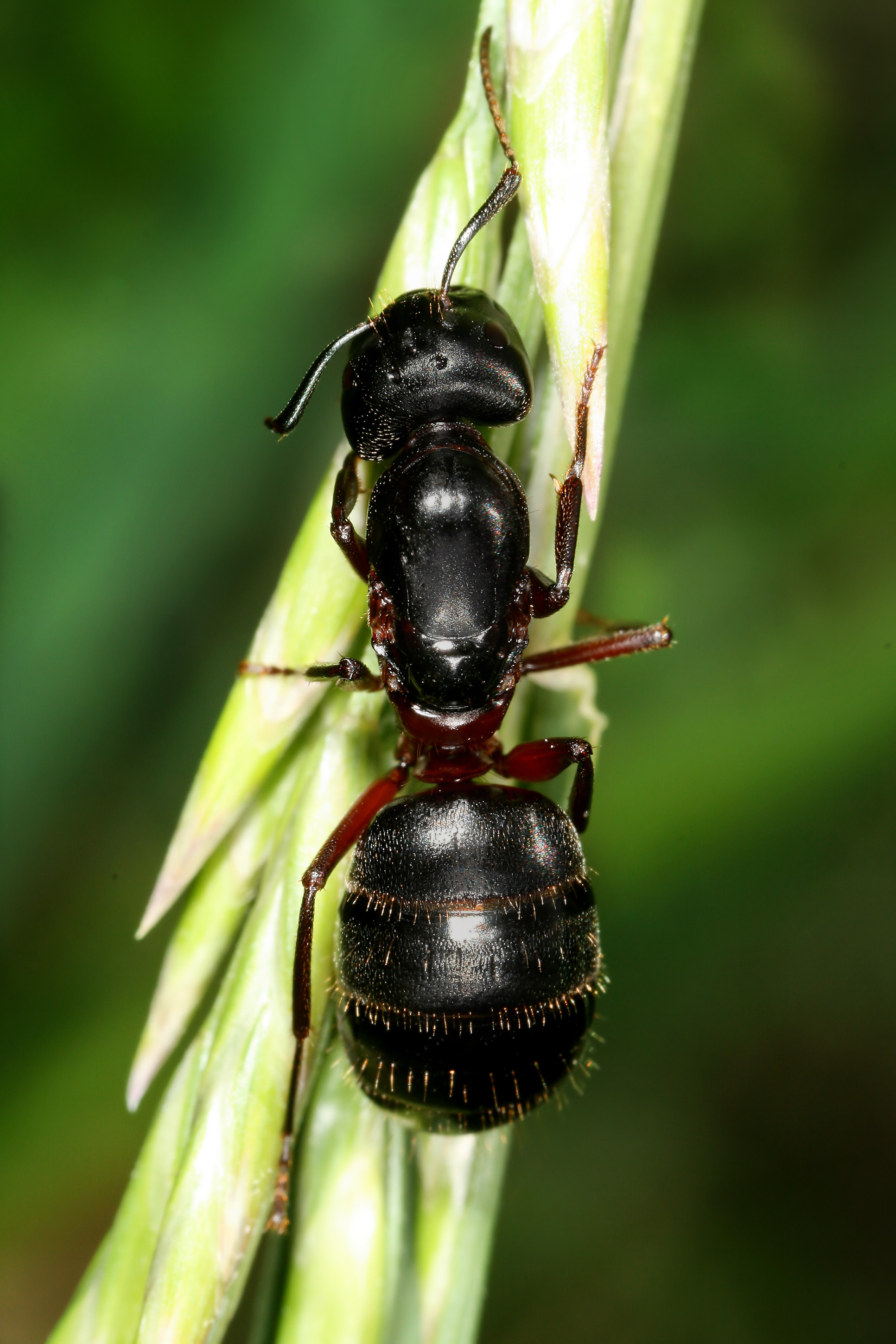
The large Hercules ant (Camponotus herculeanus) has established in some of the plantations here. It is either rare or absent from the rest of Denmark.

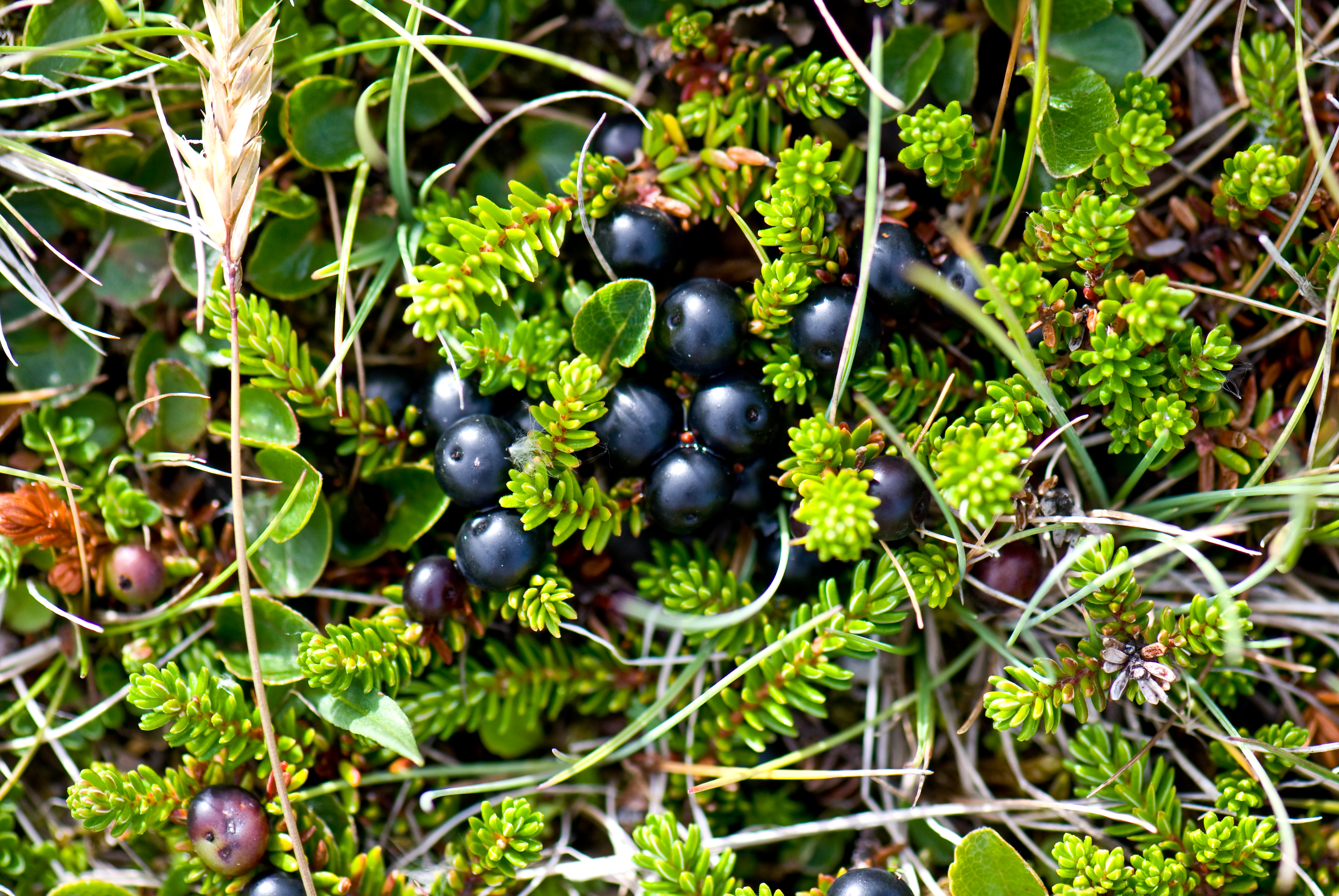
Black crowberries. Many of the plants in the national park are edible.

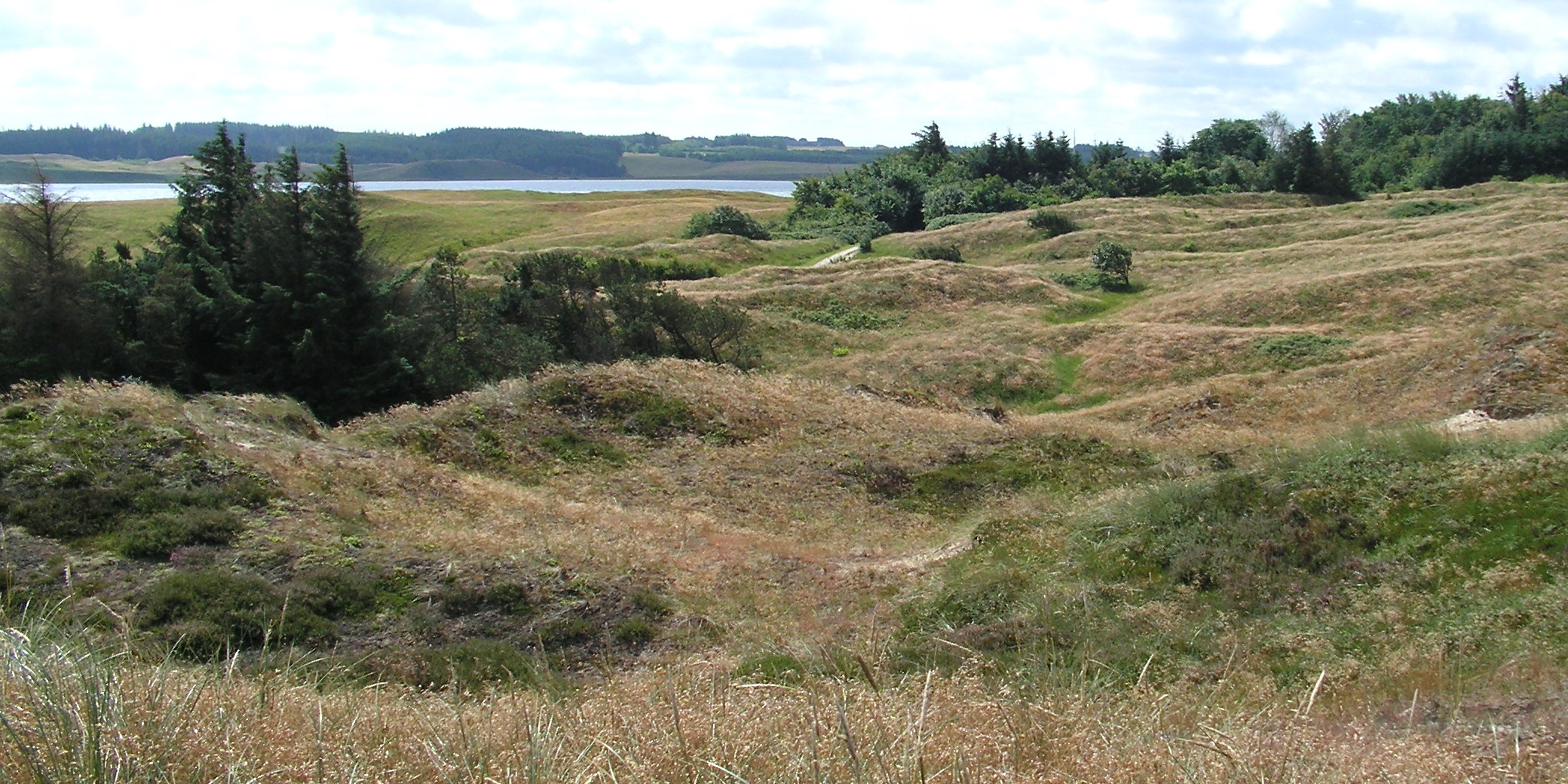
View across the dune heaths of Hanstholm game preserve.

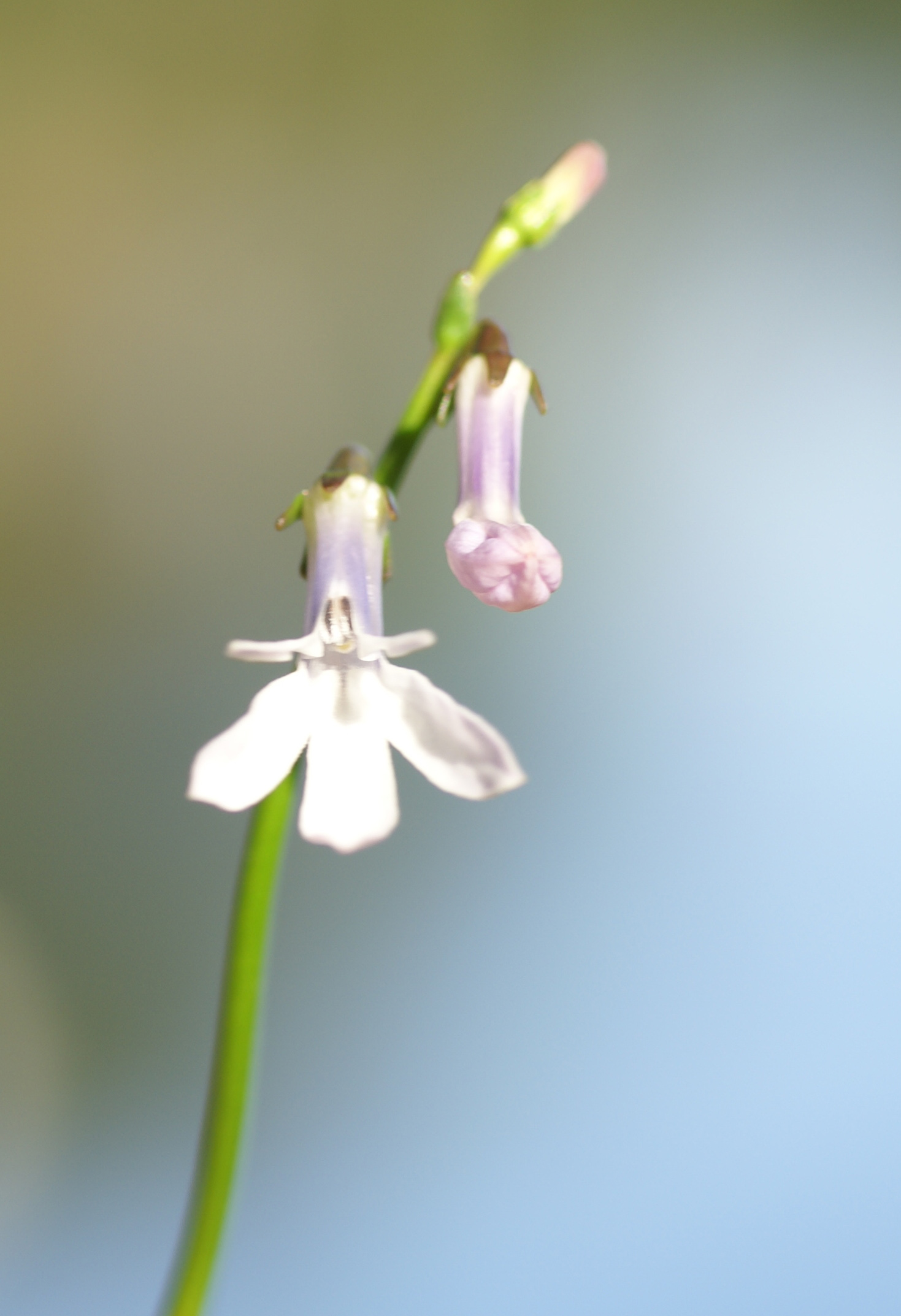
The slender water lobelias are indicator species of the very clean lakes and ponds in the national park.

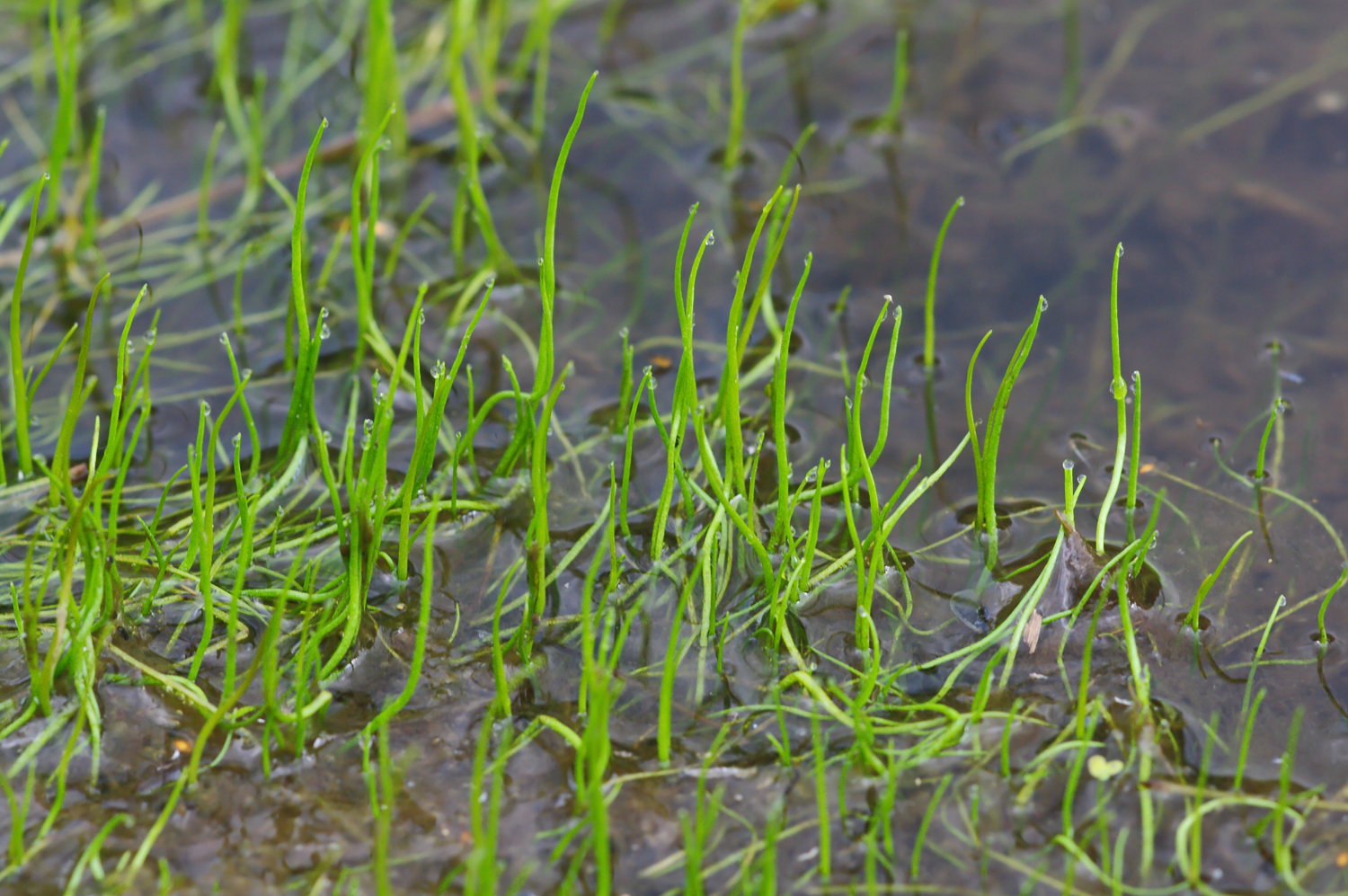
The peculiar pillwort fern is near threatened (NT) on a global scale, but found growing in Thy.

== Cultural history ==
The cultural history found in Thy National Park is as old as the land itself. At the end of the last Ice Age, when the ice melted and receded, the land began to rise by the process of post-glacial rebound and the virgin grounds were soon settled by Stone Age cultures. Their early presence and activities are still visible in the landscape in the shape of dolmens, burial mounds, kitchen middens and organized flint productions.

As the land continued to rise from the sea, human activity increased as well and Thy was a very active spot, with a thriving culture in the Bronze Ages. We have archaeological evidence from their settlements in the area and many barrows from that period can still be seen, especially in the northern reaches near Hanstholm. An unknown number of the pre-historic remains have been covered by the drifting sands and dunes over the aeons though, so the fact that so many mounds are still visible is an indication of just how active the area was.

The human activity continued into the iron Age, the Viking Age and the Middle Ages, with their own individual traces in the national park, often with a strong tie to the harsh North Sea. It was at some point during these times that the formerly lush environment around Thy collapsed. For many years the land had been stressed and over-exploited by excessive grazing and tree cutting. Finally drifting sands got the upper hand and have formed the environment and culture here for several centuries. It was not until around the year 1800 that larger organized efforts to stop the destructive sand drifts was initiated and it took more than a hundred years for them to succeed.

From modern times, perhaps the most dramatic evidence of human activities are the German bunkers built here during World War II, when Denmark was occupied. The German Wehrmacht found it important to fortify themselves in Thy and all along the west coast. As part of the Atlantic Wall, Thy was strategically important in dominating the North Sea, limiting the Allied marine forces, as an effective defence against the British air force and for many other reasons. Many of the massive concrete bunkers and fortifications are still around today, some abandoned or ruined and some restored and now functioning as museums and testimonies of that bleak era. In the north part of the park lies the Hanstholm Fortress, as a modern museum of the events that took place here in World War II. In total, five restored bunkers and batteries are spread along the coastline in the national park.

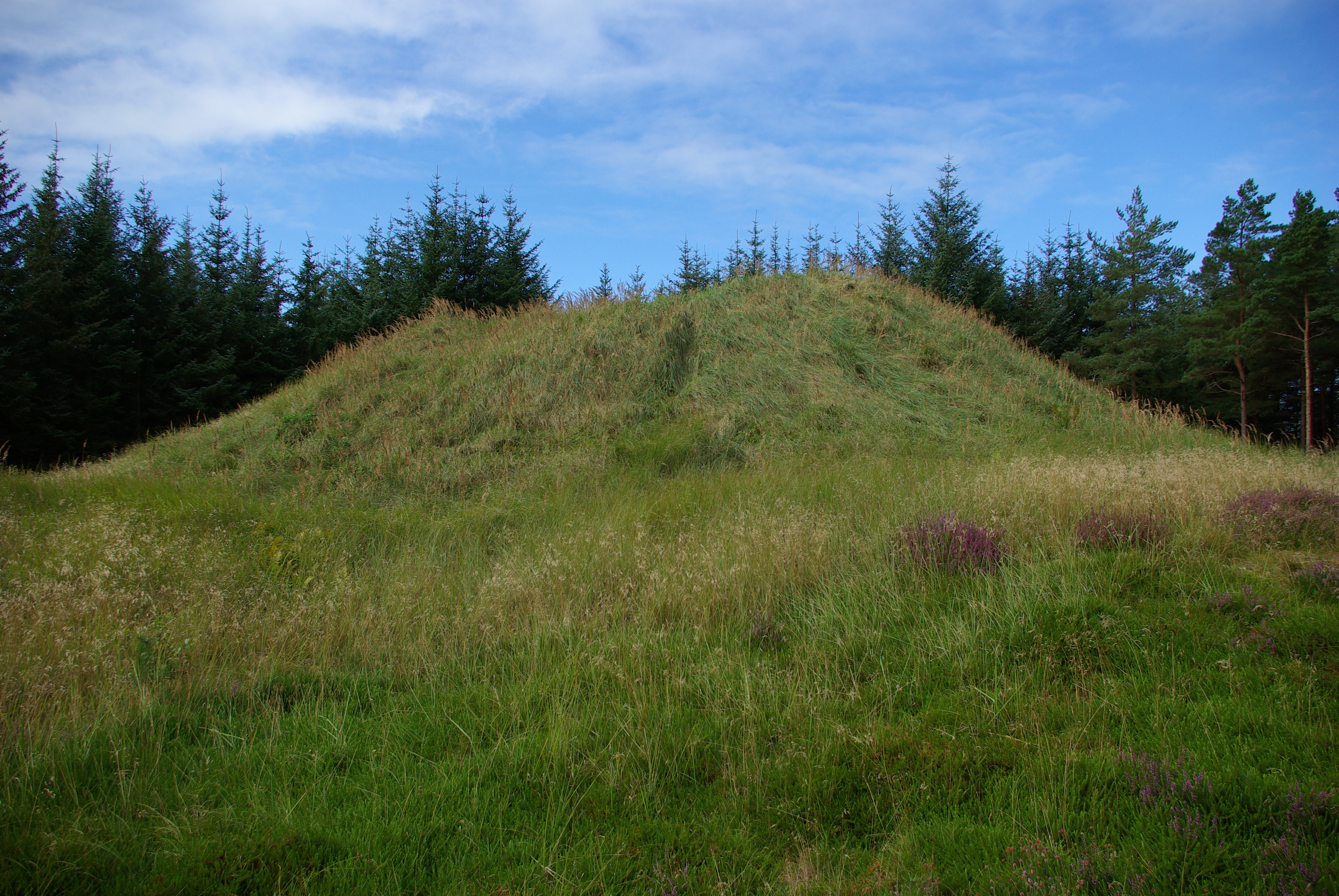
Dyrhøj. One of the many Bronze Age burial mounds in Thy.

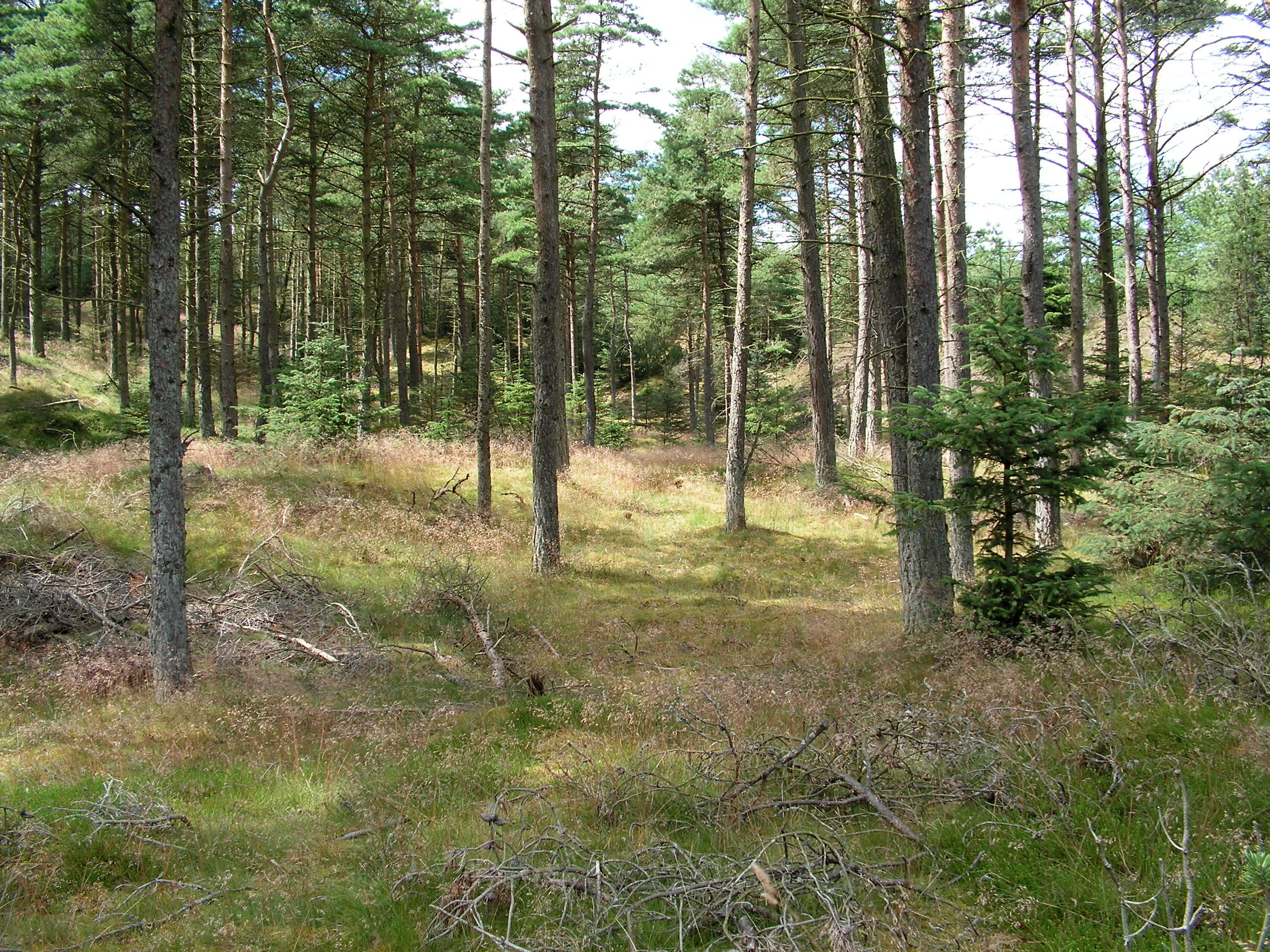
The plantations stopped the advance of the destructive sand drifts, but it took more than 100 years.

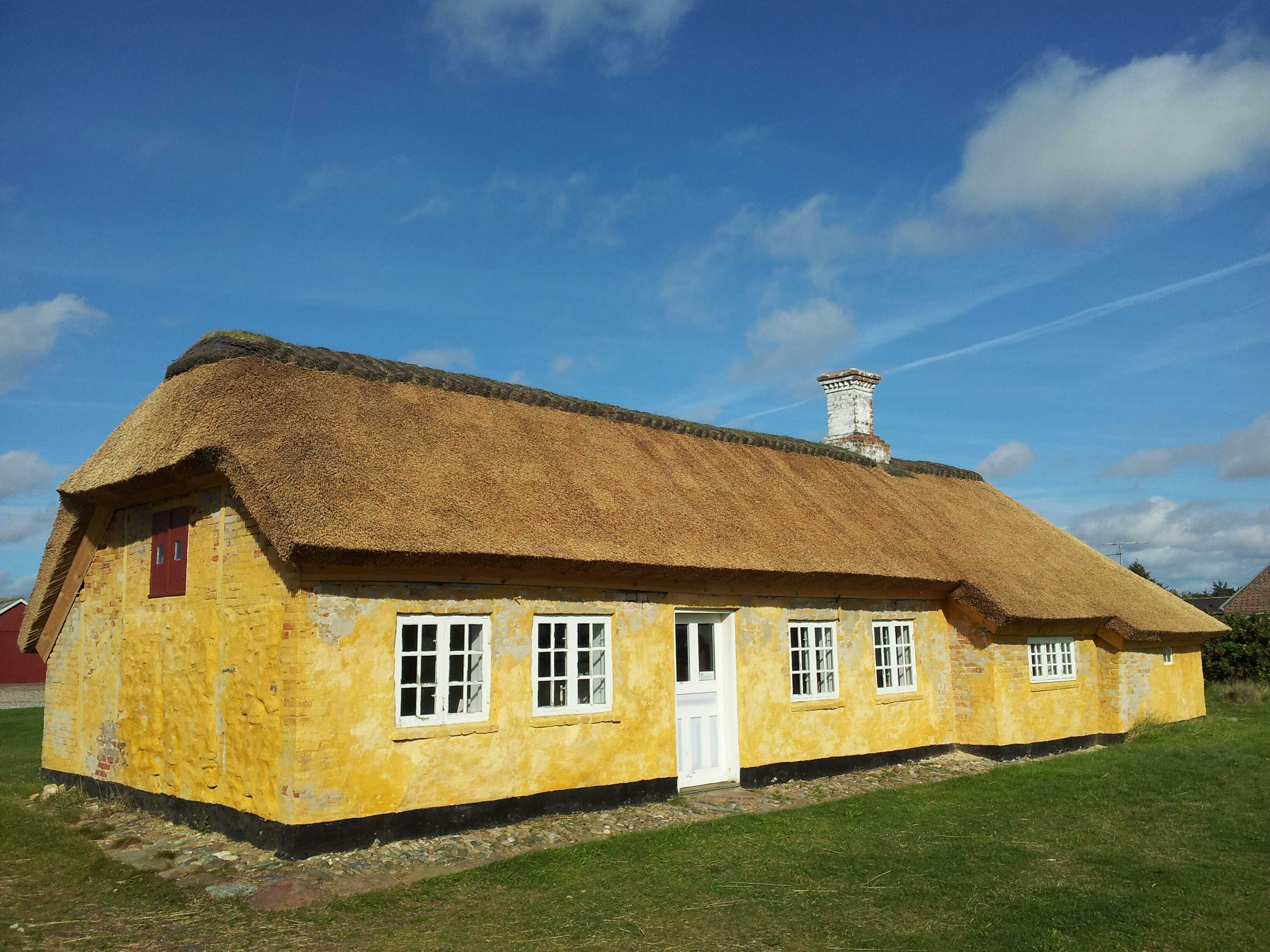
An old fisherman's house in Agger.

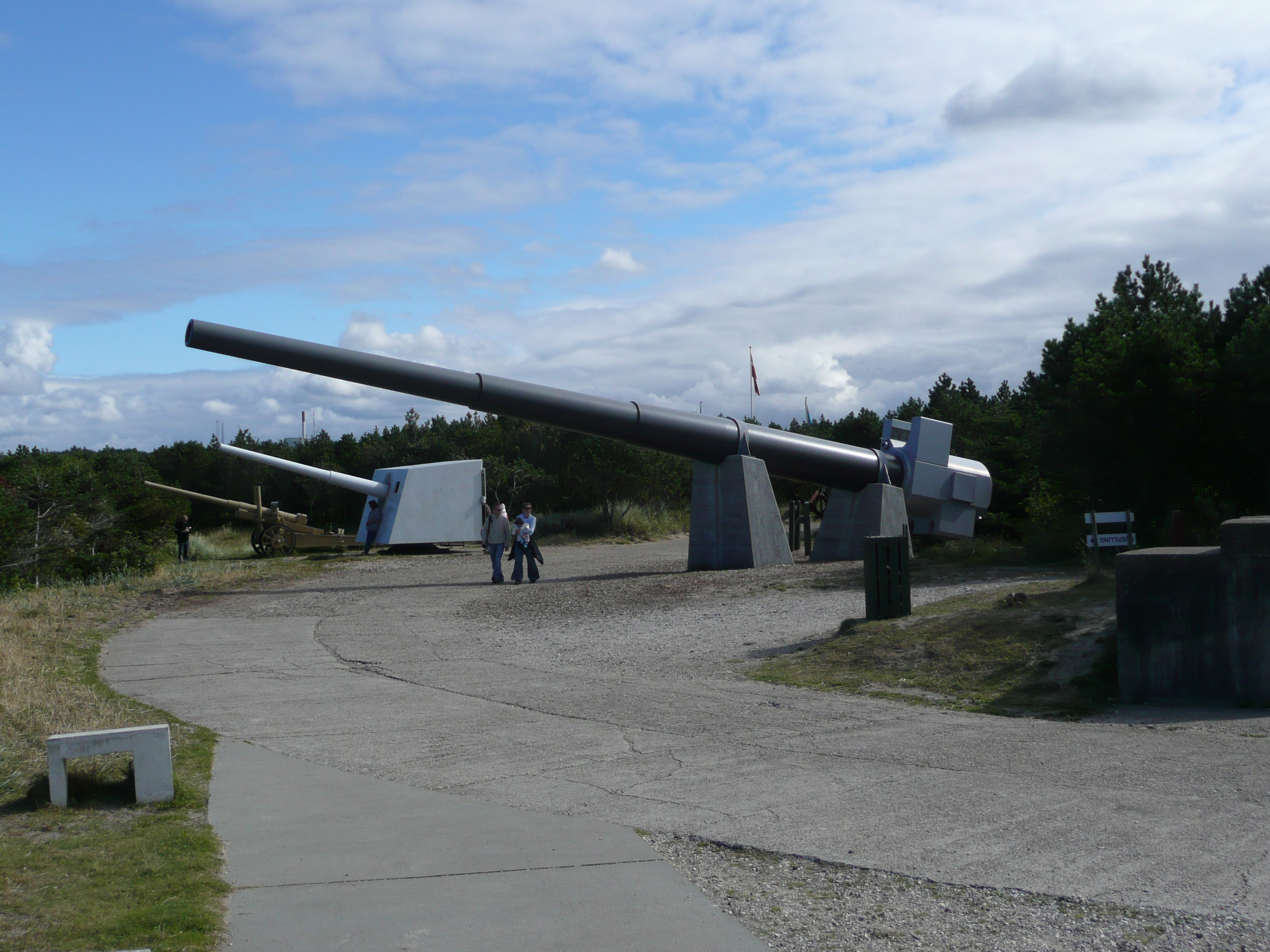
Some of the cannons at the Hanstholm Fortress, now a World War II museum.

== See also ==
- List of national parks of Denmark
