= Bjørn & Okay =

Danish pop group

- Origin: Denmark
- Genres: Pop
- Years active: 1968-2015
- Past members: Bjørn Hansen; Benny Jensen; Svend Aage Studsgaard; Erik Madsen

Bjørn & Okay was a Danish pop group formed in 1968, and fronted by singer and bass player Bjørn Hansen. Their lineup has changed throughout the years, with Hansen remaining as the main figure. Presently, the band is made up of Hansen, guitarist Erik Madsen, keyboard player Svend Aage Studsgaard, and drummer Benny Jensen.

The band has had a string of hits, notably "Du og jeg", "Den gule flyver", "Tro, håb og kærlighed" and "Bind dit gule hårbånd".

Hansen's son Johnny Hansen is also a musician; he is a member of the dansband Kandis.

== Discography ==
=== Albums ===
(selective)

- 2003: Gæstealbummet (DEN: #10)
- 2004: 100 go'e med (DEN: #15)
- 2005: 40 år / 40 Hits (DEN: #33)
