= Hanstholm =

- Town
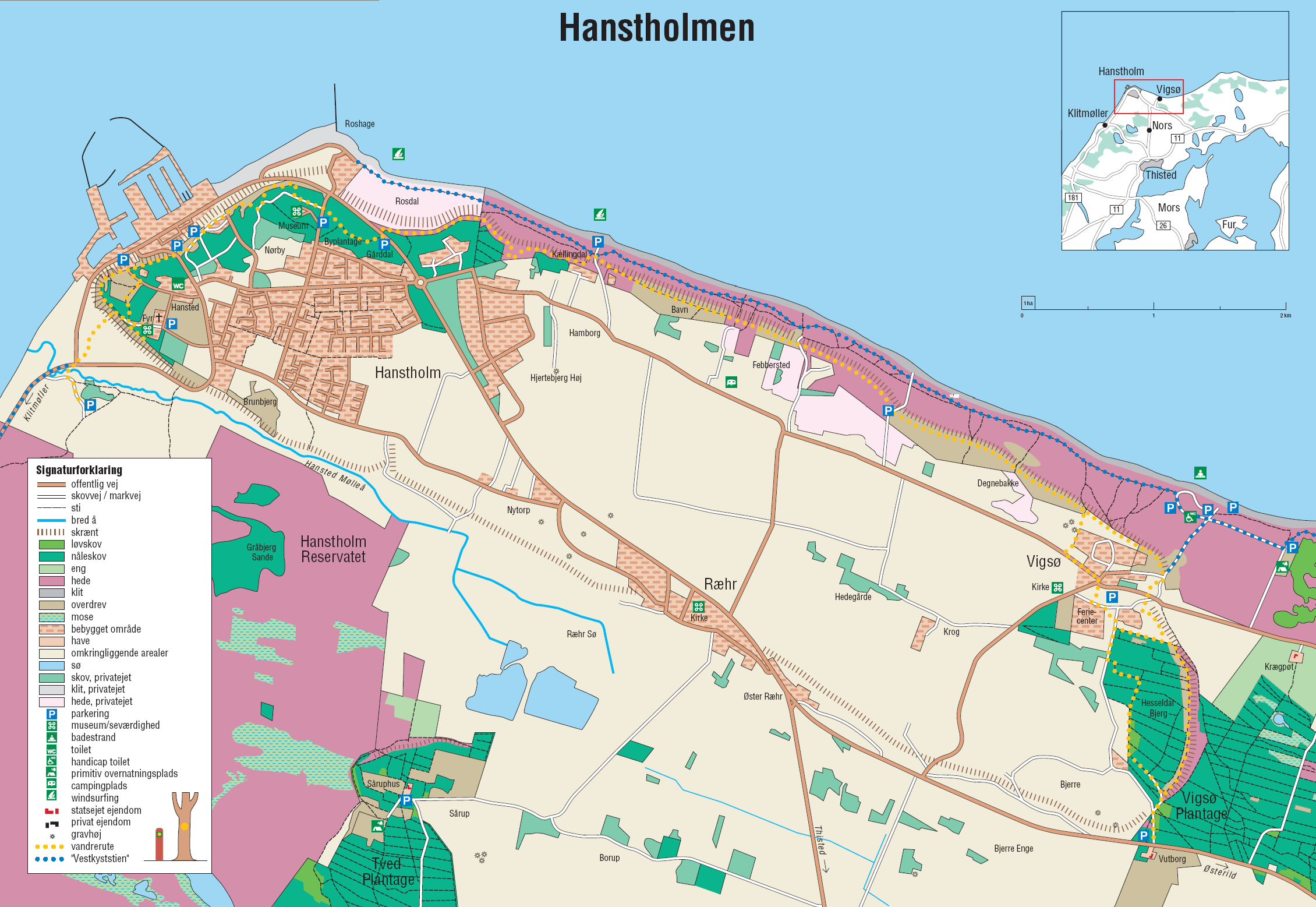
- Map of Hanstholm. From the brochure "Vandreture nr. 118. Hanstholmen", opdated January 2005, published by the Danish Forest and Nature Agency

- Location in Denmark Hanstholm (North Jutland Region)
- Coordinates: 57°07′12″N 8°37′12″E
- Country: Denmark
- Region: Region Nordjylland
- Municipality: Thisted Municipality

Area
  - Urban: 2.97 km^{2} (1.15 sq mi)

Population (2026)
  - Urban: 2,058
  - Urban density: 693/km^{2} (1,790/sq mi)
- Time zone: UTC+1 (CET)
  - Summer (DST): UTC+2 (CEST)
- Postal code: DK-7730 Hanstholm

Hanstholm is a small town and a former island, now elevated area in Thisted municipality of Region Nordjylland, located in northern Denmark. The population of the town is 2,058 (1 January 2026).

== Etymology ==
The former island Hanstholm (short form of the original name Hansted Holm) has many placenames, including Hansted, Nørby, Gårddal, Ræhr, Hamborg, Bjerre, Febbersted, Krog, Nytorp and Vigsø. In the beginning of the second millennium, churches were built in Vigsø, Ræhr and Hansted, forming three parishes.

At the end of the 20th century, Denmark's largest harbour was built in Hansted, and a 10-fold larger harbour town was needed. A new town was planned, covering the places Hansted, Gårddal and Nørby, and the new town was officially named Hanstholm. This has led to some confusion, because the people from the towns Ræhr and Vigsø live on Hanstholm (the former island), they live in Hanstholm postal district, they live in Hanstholm municipality, but they don't live in Hanstholm town.

However, since all the parts of this new harbour town belong to Hansted parish, and because Hansted has been the harbour town for so many centuries, many people refer to this town simply as Hansted instead of Hanstholm.

Besides Hanstholm and Hansted, one more name is related to this, Hanherred:

- Hansted means "The place of Han". This suffix is often used with town names in Denmark.
- Hanstholm means "The island of Hansted".
- Hanherred means "The herred of Han", where herred is an old-age administrative division.

== Geography ==
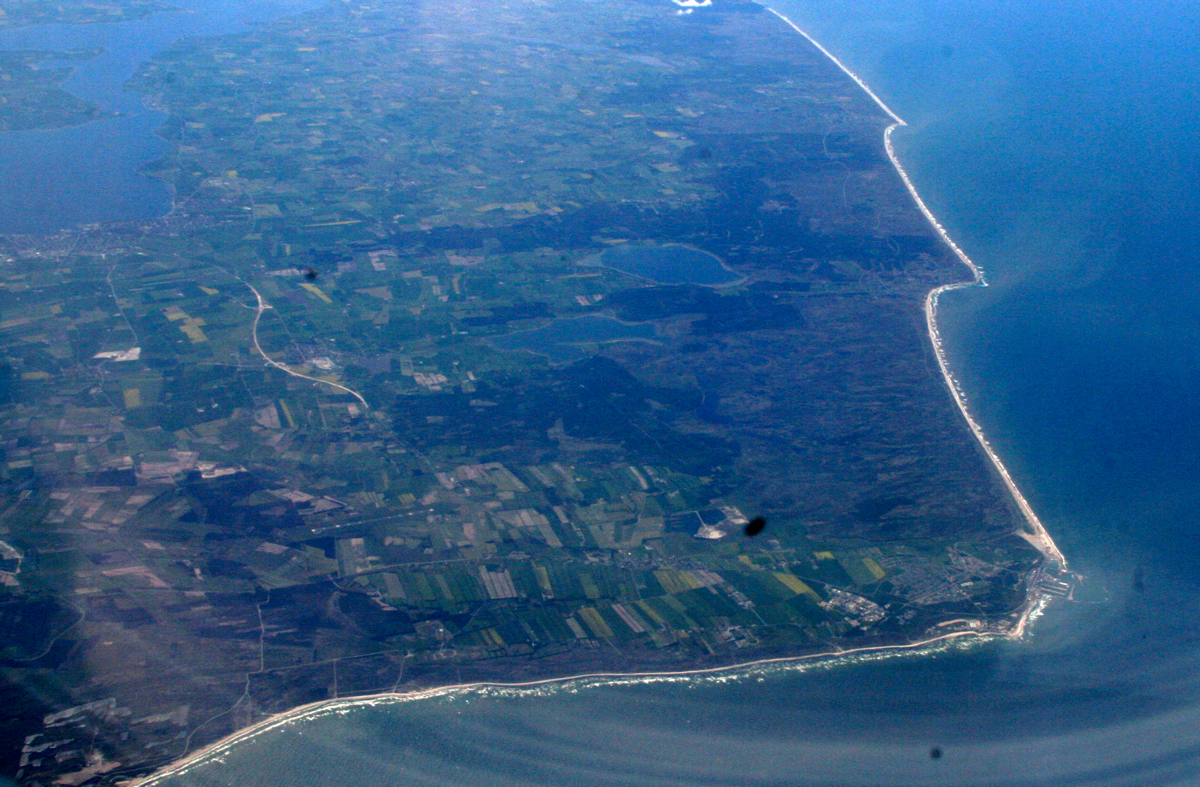
Hanstholm viewed from farther north

To the north is Vigsø Bay ("Vigsø Bugt") a part of Skagerrak, to the west is the North Sea.

The ferry MV Norröna of Smyril Line operated a weekly summer service to the Faroe Islands and Iceland from Hanstholm until 2010. This service now departs from Hirtshals.

The northern part of Denmark is rising because of plate tectonics, and has lifted the island of Hanstholm out of the water so that it is no longer an island, but an elevated area. You can still see two old farms: Bådsgård, which means boat farm, is located on the previous island Hanstholm; Færgegård, which means ferry farm, is located in Sårup towards Hansted. Today you can simply drive between Sårup and Hansted.

== Urban planning ==
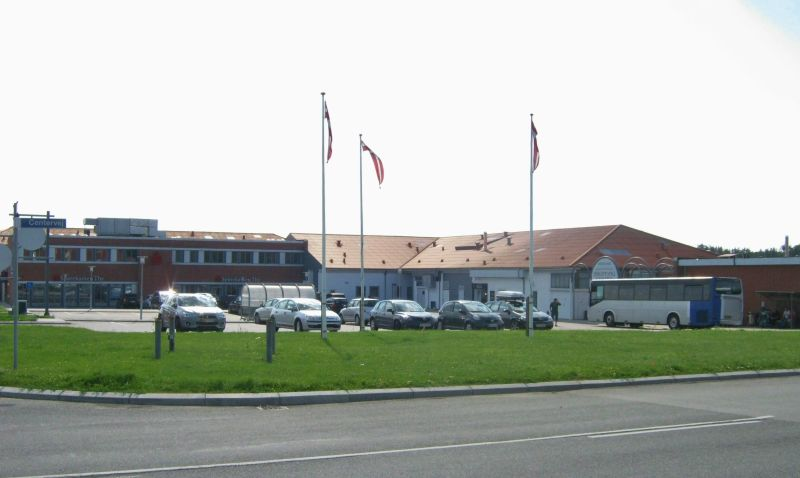
Hanstholm Center

As Hansted's population grew from a couple of hundred to several thousand people during the 20th century, some urban planning was applied. It seems to have been modelled in the same way as other growing Danish towns in the 1960s, which basically means that you can drive through the city without noticing the size of it.

Most shopping is concentrated in a shopping mall (Hanstholm Centret), and there are separate pedestrian and bicycle paths covering most of the city.

== History ==
=== Prehistoric ===
Several excavations have shown that the Hanstholm area was inhabited by farmers as early as 1000 B.C.

=== Teutons ===
In the year 120 B.C., Teutons inhabited the area, but left in a large exodus, together with the Cimbri, towards the south, where they encountered the Romans.

=== Age of the Vikings ===
In the years 800 to 1050, Hanstholm and the area around it were islands, and nearby was the gathering point for the Vikings for their invasions of England and France.

=== First Christianity ===
According to legend, the first Christian church in the Thy area was built in 1040 in Vestervig, where Christian priests coming from England entered Denmark. A big monastery was later built here and this was the beginning of the end of the Viking era.

The churches in Ræhr, Hansted and Vigsø were built in the 12th century in Roman style, and on Hansted church, one of the stones shows the picture of a trading vessel. This trading vessel has been used as model for the arms of the former Hanstholm municipality.

=== Norwegian trade ===
From approximately 1600 to approximately 1850, people from the area of Hanstholm traded considerably with Norway, which was a part of Denmark at that time, with special boats across the Skagerrak. They exported food, mostly grain, and imported logs. There were no trees in the whole area, so wood was in high demand. The primary harbours for this trade were Vigsø and Klitmøller, the latter because they had water mills to produce flour.

For this trade, special ships were designed, named 'sandskuder', meaning 'sand boats'. They were able to sail directly onto the beach and were designed for the transport of grain, flour and logs.

=== Sand drift ===
A lot of sand began to drift from the west coast towards the east in the 14th century. In 1555, the sand drift had damaged a large area of Vigsø parish, and the local pastor suggested the abandonment of both the parish and the church. However, people stayed in the area, and the parish remained active. The other parishes were hit hard as well, and in 1690 there were dunes on the pastor's fields, more than 12 metres high.

Numerous attempts to stop the sand drift finally succeeded in the 19th century by the planting of trees and lyme grass. However, many low coastal areas between the former islands had already been covered with dunes. South of Hanstholm, a unique dune landscape of approximately 4,000 hectares has become a wildlife reservation, named Hansted Reservat.

=== Hanstholm Lighthouse 1843 ===
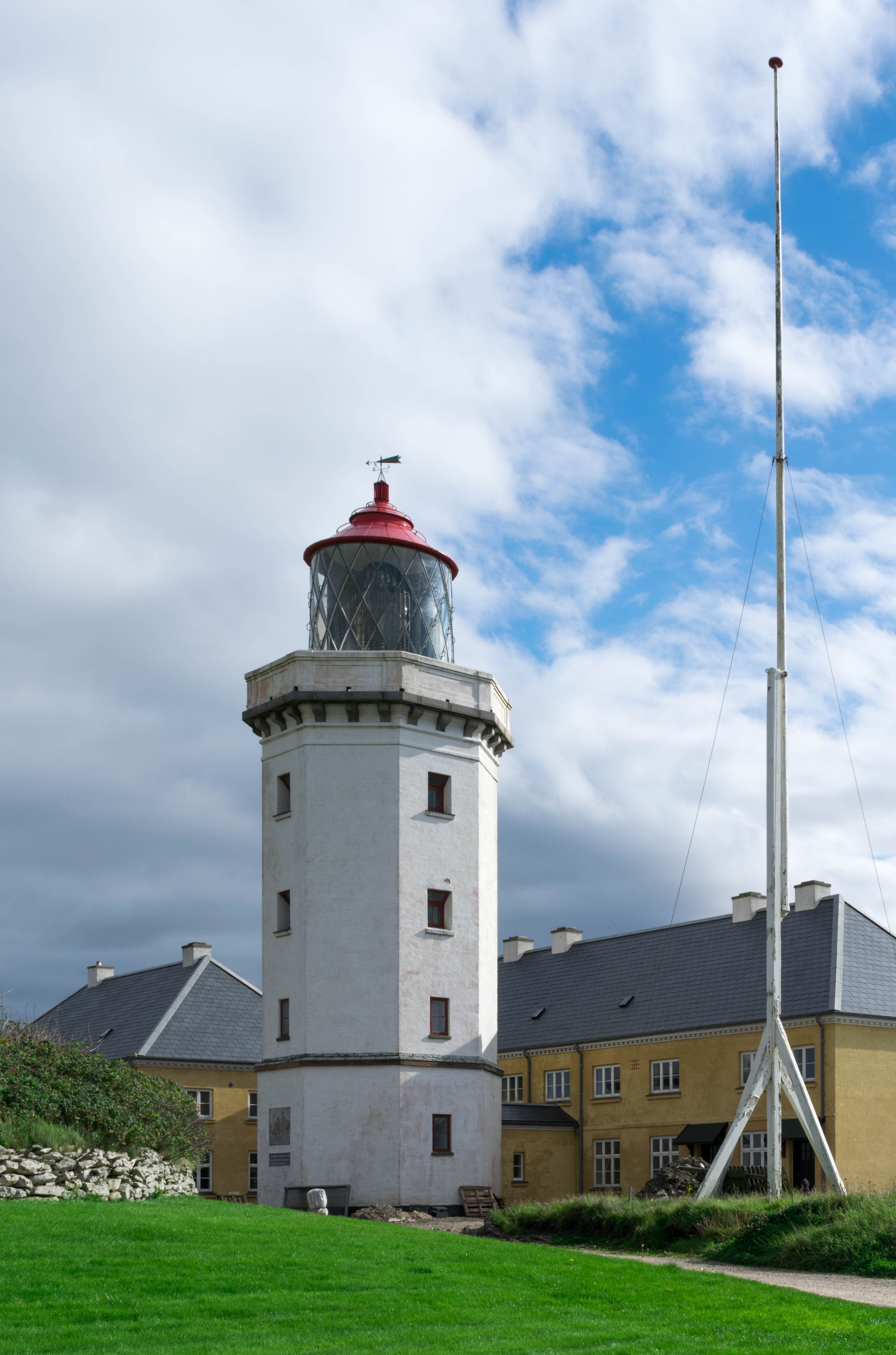
Hanstholm Lighthouse

The lighthouse was initially built in 1842, but the construction was too weak, so it had to be torn down and rebuilt in 1843. It was the first lens-based lighthouse in Denmark. When it was electrified in 1889, it became the strongest lighthouse in Denmark, and still is today, even though the light intensity has been lowered. In a period of its life, it was also the strongest lighthouse in the world. The lighthouse was automated in 1970, and in 1979 the buildings associated with the lighthouse were converted to a museum about the nature and history of the surrounding area.

From the top of the lighthouse, 65 metres above the ocean, you can see the entire area.

=== World War II ===
During the Second World War, the citizens of Hansted were removed and Europe's biggest fortress was built by the Germans in this area. Large 38 cm. naval guns were installed, that could shoot almost half the distance to Norway, in order to block allied entry into the Kattegat and thus the Baltic Sea. Similar cannons were installed in Kristiansand in Norway. Thousands of bunkers were constructed in the area. After the war it was too dangerous to blow them away and the bunkers themselves were too solid to remove in other ways. Therefore, most bunkers still remain in the ground, and some can even be seen on beaches or in the water, where the ocean has moved the coastline (the coastline moved, but the bunkers did not). Only a few bunkers lying in the way of road constructions have later been blown up using a special method of filling them with water before the explosion. A museum in Hanstholm gives access to the central parts of this World War II fortress.

After the war, many conifers were planted in order to provide shelter against the wind and in order to hide the German concrete constructions (ref. SkovOgNatur brochure).

The conifers are now slowly being replaced by broadleaf trees, which are more natural to area.

=== The Municipal reform of 2007 ===
As a result of the Municipal reform of 2007, Hanstholm Municipality ceased to exist on 1 January 2007, when it was merged with Thisted and Sydthy municipalities to form the new Thisted Municipality.

== Port of Hanstholm ==
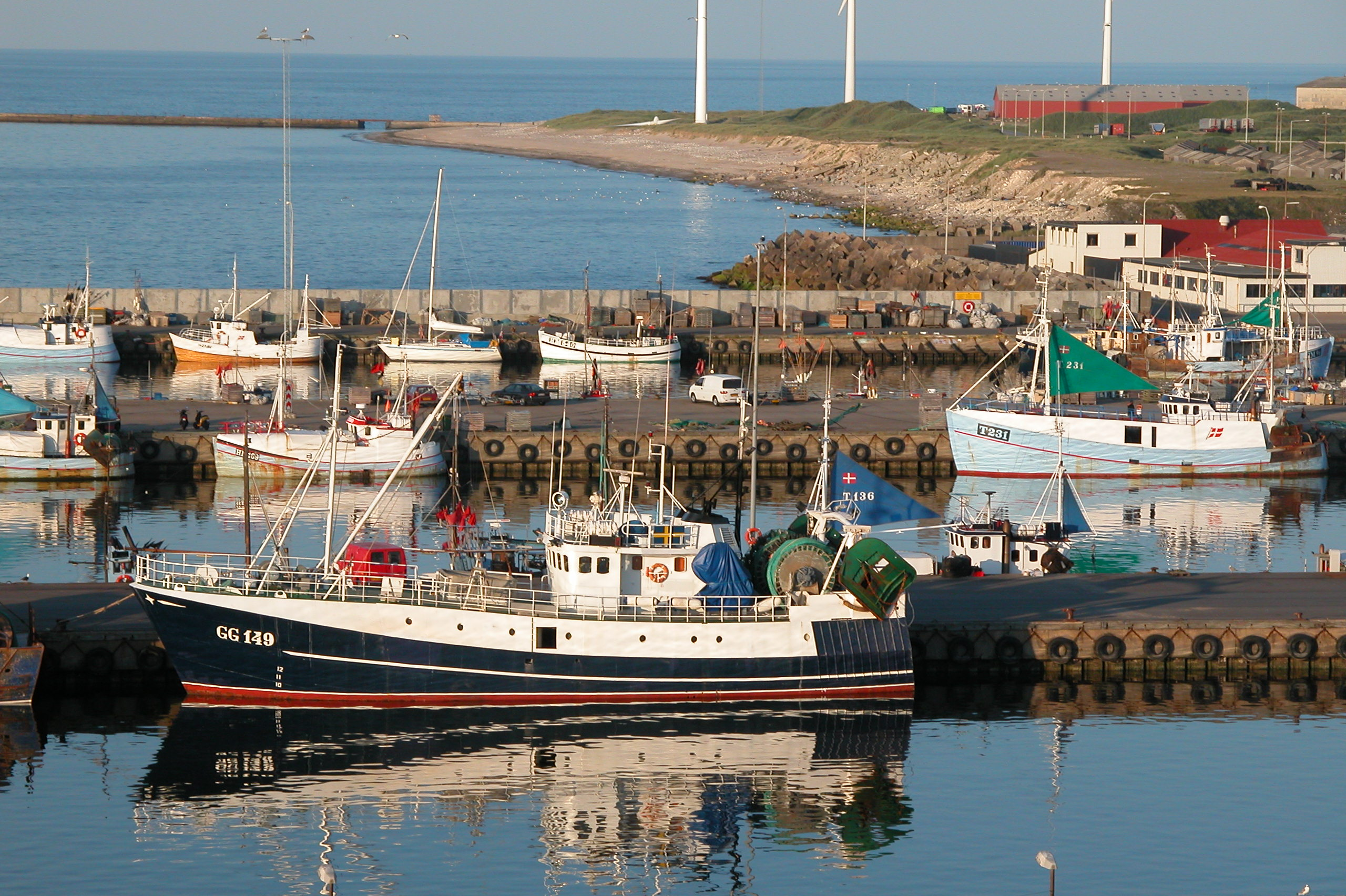
Hanstholm Harbour

Hanstholm is located on the northern edge of a salt dome, and this edge consists of very hard chalk, which is the reason that ice age erosion did not remove these formations. Because the ocean streams in this area prevent the ocean from freezing, and because of Hanstholm's geographic location, it is the perfect place for an industrial harbour, open all year.

In 1917, the Danish Parliament decided by law to build a harbour in Hanstholm. However, this was delayed by numerous incidents, including the low grants in the 1930s, and even though the Germans had plans to use the harbour as part of their strategy when they occupied Denmark in the Second World War, they stopped all construction in June 1943, removed all machines and blew up the buildings on the beach.

After the Second World War, a political struggle began to complete the harbour's construction, but the other harbours in Denmark feared this. But the passing of a new law on 29 April 1960 finally led to the harbour's completion. It opened in 1967 and today is one of the largest harbours in Denmark.

Fjord Line ferries sailed from Hanstholm until autumn 2008 to Western Norway (Egersund, Haugesund and Bergen). Fjord Line's fast ferry Fjord Cat to Kristiansand sailed from the harbour (ex-MasterCat and Mads Mols) until October 2009.

Previously there has also been a ferry service to the Faroe Islands and Iceland from Hanstholm with the ferry Norröna owned by the Faroese shipping company Smyril Line. But in the autumn of 2010, after almost 20 years of regular ferry service to and from the Faroe Islands and Iceland, the shipping company Smyril Line unexpectedly chose to stop all of its operations to and from Hanstholm. Instead it moved all Danish operations to the Port of Hirtshals approximately 140 km north of Hanstholm.

With the loss of the ferry service to the Faroe Islands and Iceland, Hanstholm also lost its last ferry connection to and from the city, but there are still on-going attempts to establish new ferry routes to the city, and at the same time try to get some of the old ferry routes back to the port of Hanstholm.

== Museums ==
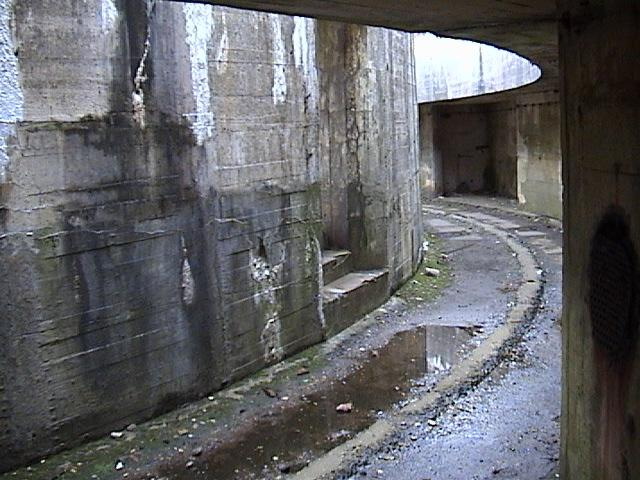
Hanstholm-Bunker

There are two museums in Hanstholm, one of which enables visitors to go down into the World War II bunkers, see how the soldiers lived, drive the ammunition train from ammunition depots to the cannons, and get an impression of how huge they were.
