= Kandis (band) =

Danish band

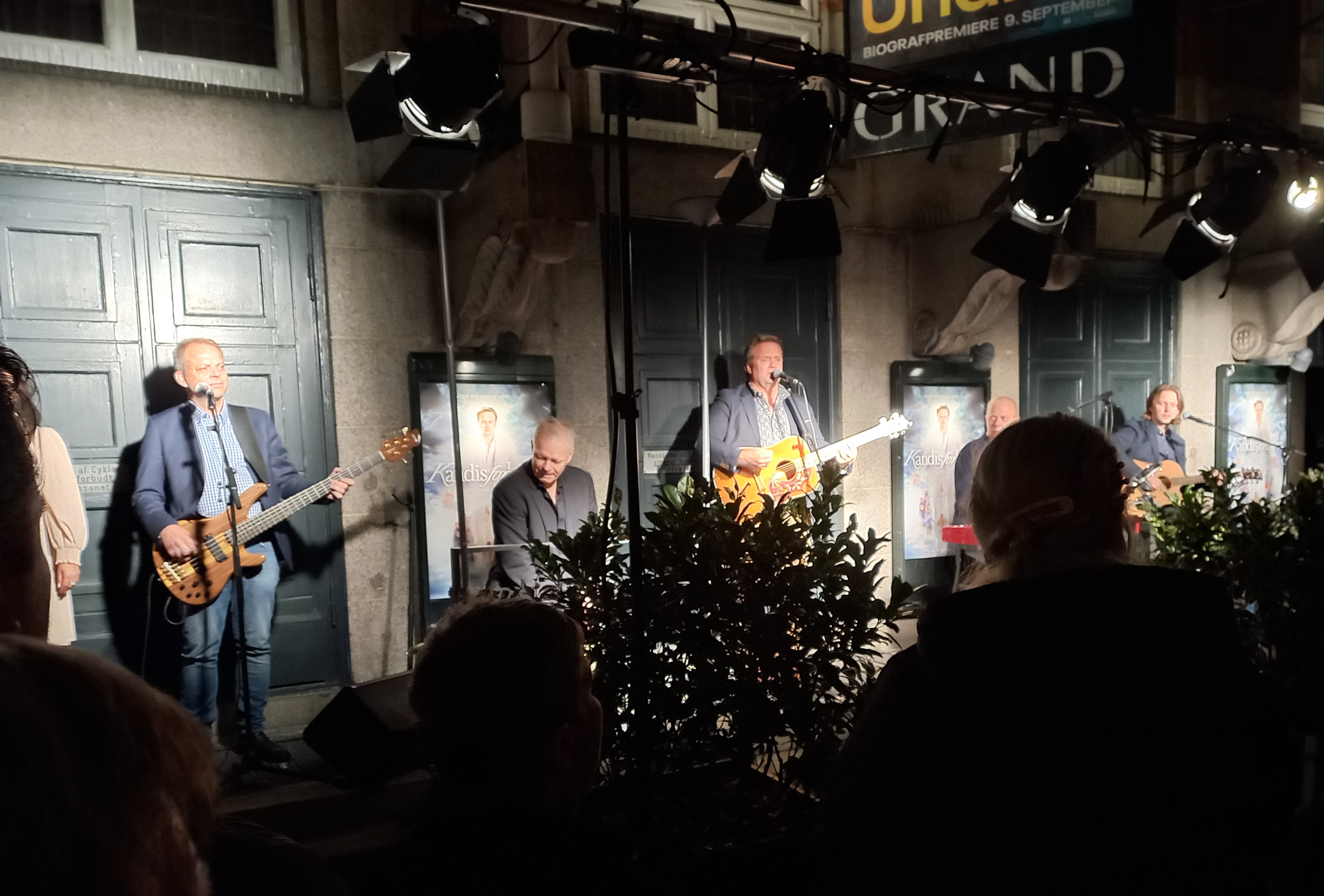
- Kandis playing outside Grand Theatre after the premiere of the documentary about them, "Kandis for Livet".

Background information
- Origin: Denmark
- Genre: Dansband
- Years active: 1990-present
- Label: My Way Music
- Members: Johnny Hansen; Jens Erik Jensen; Ole Svendsen; Frank Thøgersen; Mads Hyldahl
- Past members: Jørgen Hein Jørgensen
- Website: www.kandis.dk

Kandis is a Danish dansband made up of Johnny Hansen, Frank Thøgersen, Mads Hyldahl, Ole Svendsen and Jens Erik Jensen. Formed in 1989, Kandis scored their biggest hit in 1993, "En lille ring af guld," which topped the Danish Danse Charts for a total of 33 weeks.

Their albums regularly chart in the Top 5 of the Danish Albums Chart, such as 2008's Kandis 12 or 2011's Kandis 14.

Lead singer and guitarist Johnny Hansen, also has a solo career releasing various albums like Godmorgen verden (1999), Lidt efter lidt (2001) and Mit ferieparadis (2006)

== Discography ==
(For Johnny Hansen separate solo discography, see Johnny Hansen)

=== Albums ===
(Selective listing. In parentheses, top positions in the Danish Albums Chart)

Year	Album	Peak positions	Certification
Year	Album	DEN	Certification
1993	Kandis 4		
2002	Kandis 9	4	
2003	Kandis 10	2	
2005	Kandis 11	6	
2008	Kandis 12	1	Platin
2009	Kandis 13	5	
2011	Kandis 14	1	Platin
2012	Kandis 15	2	Gold
2014	Kandis 16	1	Platin
2016	Liebesgrüße aus Dänemark	33	
2016	Kandis 17	3	Gold
2017	Sommerdansen 5	7	
2018	Kandis 18	2	
2019	Kandis 19: Latest & Greatest	3	
2020	Kandis 20	4	
2021	Kandis 21	4	
2023	Kandis 22	2	
2025	Kandis 23	9	

Live albums

Year	Album	Peak positions	Certification
Year	Album	DEN	Certification
2004	Kandis Live	2	
2009	Kandis Live 2 - 20 års jubilæumsshow	1	Gold
2024	35 års jubilæums tour – Live in Concert	7	

Compilation albums

Year	Album	Peak positions	Certification
Year	Album	DEN	Certification
2007	Gold	2	
2009	Kandis (10-box CD)	32	
2010	De bedste julehilsner	5	
2013	Kandis 25 års jubilæum	3	Gold
2019	Jubilæum: 30 År 1989–2019	14	

=== Singles ===
- 1993: "En lille ring af guld"
