= Sydthy Municipality =

Former municipality in Denmark

Coordinates: 57°7′N 8°37′E

Until 1 January 2007 Sydthy municipality was a Danish municipality (Danish, kommune) in the former Viborg County on the west coast of Vendsyssel-Thy, a part of the Jutland peninsula in west Denmark. This former municipality was located on the north bank of the Limfjord. The municipality covered an area of 322 km^{2}, and had a total population of 11,239 (2005). Its last mayor was Arne Hyldahl, a member of the Venstre (Liberal Party) political party. The main town and the site of its municipal council was the town of Hurup.

Sydthy municipality ceased to exist as the result of the Kommunalreformen ("The Municipality Reform" of 2007). It was merged with existing Hanstholm and Thisted municipalities to form a new Thisted municipality. This created a municipality with an area of 1,072 km^{2} and a total population of 46,158 (2005). The new municipality belongs to Region Nordjylland ("North Jutland Region").

== Gallery ==
Coat of arms of Sydthy

Flag of Sydthy
