= Thisted Municipality =

Thisted Municipality Thisted Kommune (Danish)
- Municipality
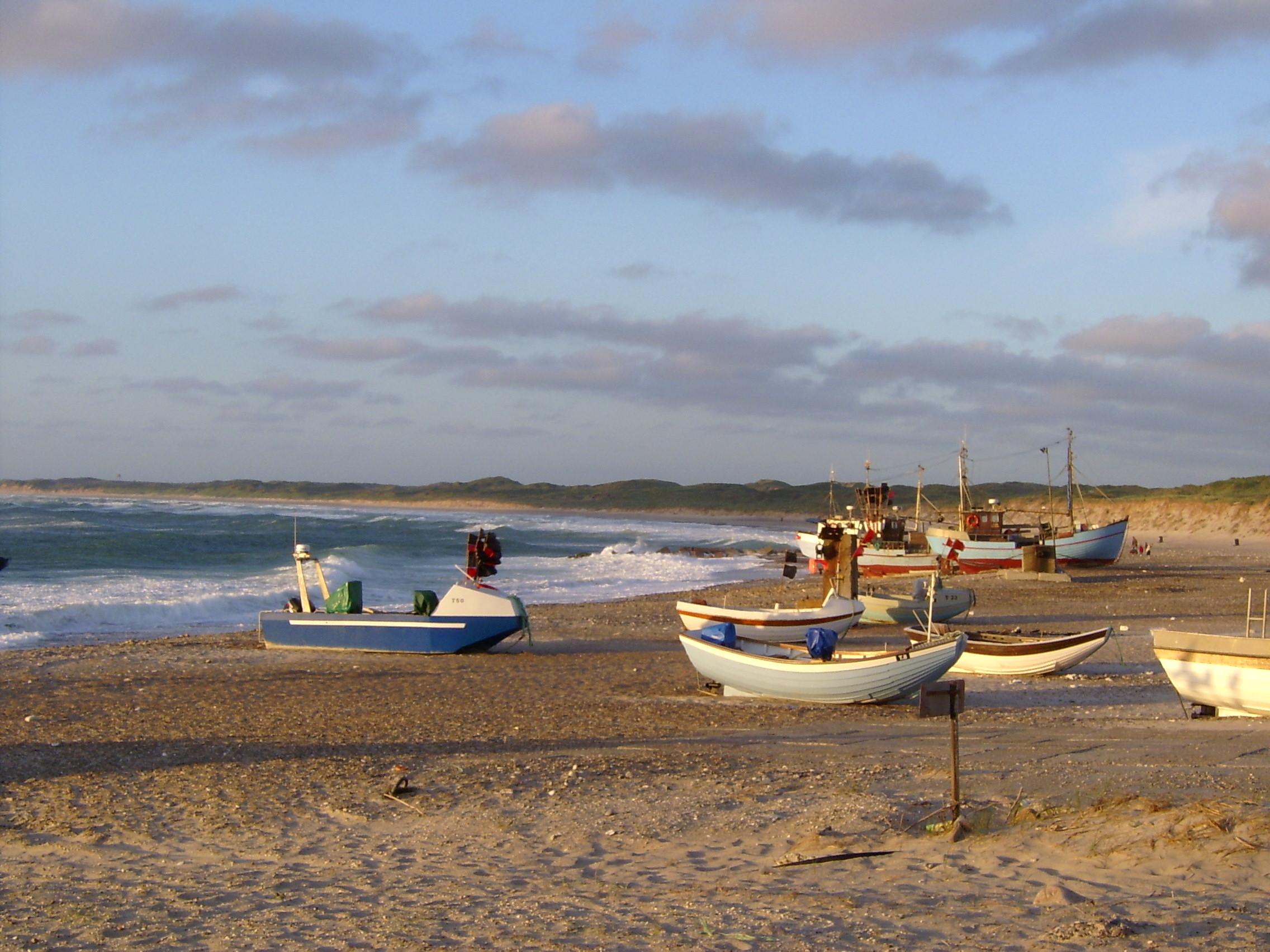
- View of beach with small trawlers berthing in Vorupør

- Coat of arms

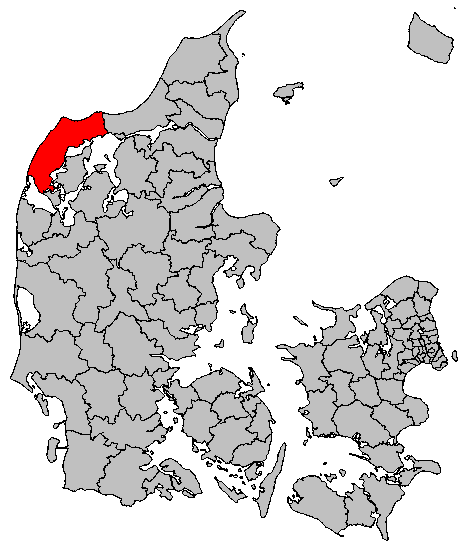
- Location in Denmark
- Coordinates: 56°57′10″N 8°36′10″E
- Country: Denmark
- Region: North Jutland
- Established: 1 January 2007

Government
  - Mayor: Niels Jørgen Pedersen

Area
  - Total: 1,101 km^{2} (425 sq mi)

Population (1 January 2026)
  - Total: 42,572
  - Density: 38.67/km^{2} (100.1/sq mi)
- Time zone: UTC+1 (CET)
  - Summer (DST): UTC+2 (CEST)
- Postal code: 7700
- Website: www.thisted.dk

Thisted Municipality (Danish: Thisted Kommune) is a kommune in North Jutland Region, Denmark. The municipality covers an area of 1,072 km^{2}, and has a total population of 42,572 (2026). The main town and the site of its municipal council is the town of Thisted.

On 1 January 2007 Thisted municipality was, as the result of Kommunalreformen ("The Municipal Reform" of 2007), merged with Hanstholm and Sydthy municipalities to form a new Thisted municipality.

== Locations ==
Thisted	13,500
Hurup	2,700
Hanstholm	2,100
Klitmøller	1,200
Snedsted	1,100
Nors	1,100

== Thy ==
Thisted municipality is roughly identical with the traditional district of Thy, except that the municipality includes a small portion of the district Hanherred, but not the southernmost peninsula of Thy, Thyholm.

== Potential name change ==
In November 2023, the municipal council voted, by 17 to 10, to advance with a proposal to change the name of the municipality to Thy Municipality. The next step was to have a feel among the citizens to see whether it should be changed. A final decision was set to take place on February 27, 2024. The proposal was then rejected in a digital citizen consultation by 62.5 % of the participants. The turnout was 54 %. Following this, the municipality dropped the proposal.

== Politics ==
=== Municipal council ===
Thisted's municipal council consists of 27 members, elected every four years.

Below is the current council composition

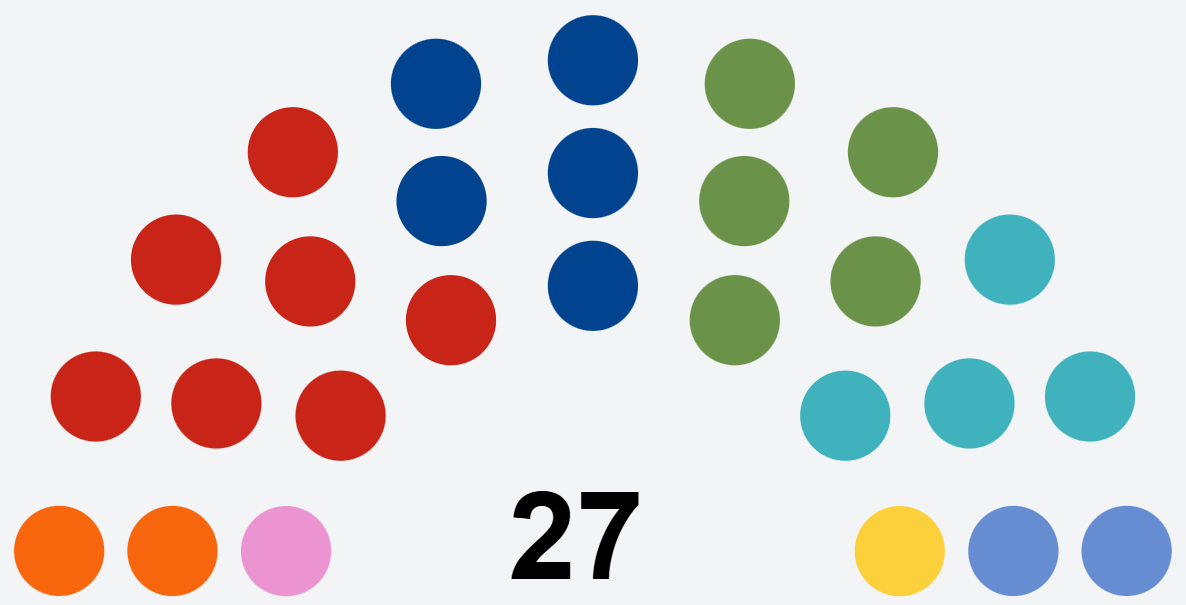

Below are the municipal councils elected between the enactment of the Municipal Reform of 2007 and the 2021 Danish local elections.

Election	Party										Total seats	Turnout	Elected mayor
Election	A	B	C	F	I	K	O	V	Ø	Å	Total seats	Turnout	Elected mayor
2005	11	1	3	1		1	1	9			27	72.1%	Erik Hove Olesen (A)
2009	10		4	2			2	9			27	68.3%	Lene Kjeldgaard (V)
2013	10		2				4	10	1		27	75.0%	Lene Kjeldgaard (V)
2017	9		5	1	1		3	6	1	1	27	74.4%	Ulla Vestergaard (A)
Data from Kmdvalg.dk 2005, 2009, 2013 and 2017

== Notable people ==
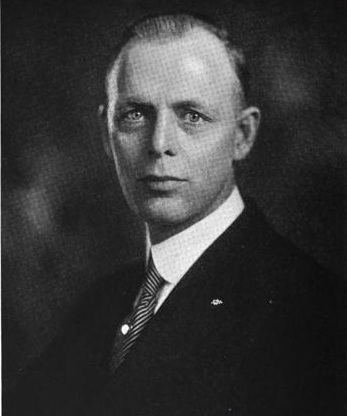
Congressman Andrew Petersen, 1921

- Niels Andersen (1835 in Ydby, Thisted County - 1911) a Danish businessman and politician; created the first large construction company in Denmark; lived in Søholm from 1877
- Andreas Riis Carstensen (1844 in Sennels, near Thisted – 1906) a Danish painter who specialized in maritime scenes, notably of Greenland.
- Johan Skjoldborg (1861 in Øsløs in Thisted – 1936) a Danish educator, novelist, playwright and memoirist
- Andrew Petersen (1870 near Thisted – 1953) was a patternmaker, foundry company executive and politician in New York City
- Aage Oxenvad (1884 in Gettrup near Thisted – 1944) a Danish clarinetist who played in the Royal Danish Orchestra from 1909
- Erik Aalbæk Jensen (1923 in Thy – 1997) a Danish writer and Lutheran minister
- Bent Larsen (1935 in Tilsted near Thisted – 2010) a Danish chess grandmaster and author
- Jonas Vingegaard (born 1996 in Hillerslev) a Danish cyclist
