= Traditional districts of Denmark =

Traditional districts

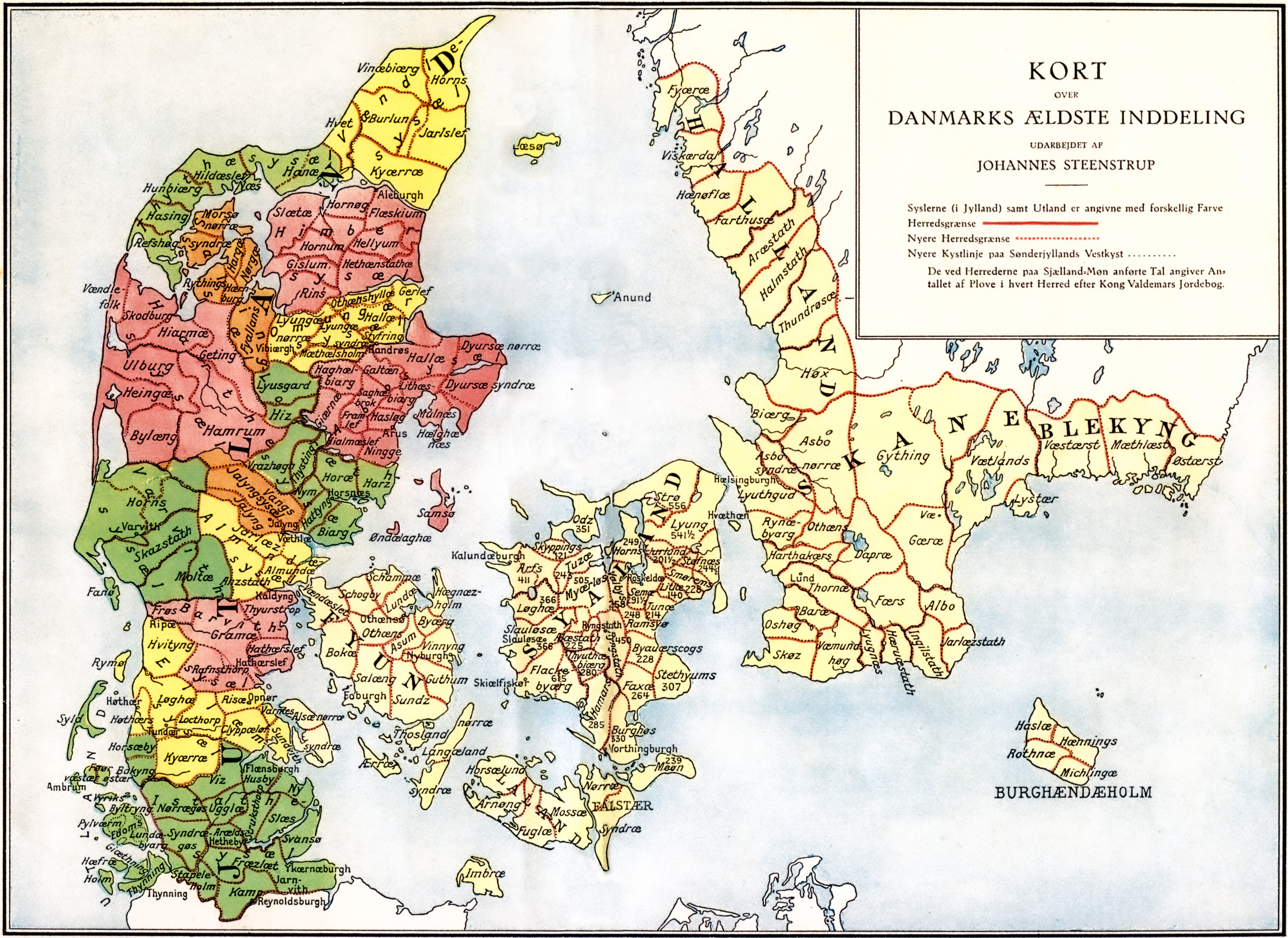
Administrative division of Denmark in Medieval times.

The traditional districts of Denmark differ from the country's administrative divisions nowadays, as their existence and extent are usually not defined by law. The Danes will often refer to their traditional districts if asked where they come from, rather than the administrative unit which has been changed several times (last in 2007).

Some of these districts are nationally known, others more locally. Some of them may vary in their delimitations, while others are based on ancient hundreds and syssels with fixed borders. Dialect, folklore and local identity will or would often vary from one traditional district to another.

The lands of Denmark were the three major parts of the country until the 17th century when the territories of Skåne, Halland and Blekinge were acquired by Sweden in the Treaty of Roskilde after Denmark lost the Second Northern War.

- Scanian Provinces
  - Scania (now Swedish)
  - Halland (now Swedish)
  - Blekinge (now Swedish)
  - Bornholm
- Øerne ('The Islands')
  - Zealand
    - Hornsherred
    - Odsherred
    - North Zealand
    - Stevns
  - Møn
  - Lolland-Falster or Smålandene
    - Lolland
    - Falster
  - Funen
  - South Funen Archipelago
    - Langeland
    - Tåsinge
    - Ærø
- Jutland
  - South Jutland
    - Vestslesvig
    - Als
    - Sundeved
    - Tørninglen
    - Angel (now German)
    - Svans (now German)
    - North Frisia (now German)
  - East Jutland
    - Kronjylland
    - Djursland
    - Bjerreherred
  - West Jutland
    - Hardsyssel
    - Fjends
  - Northwest Jutland
    - Thy
    - Mors
    - Salling
  - North Jutland
    - Himmerland
    - Hanherred
    - Vendsyssel

== See also ==
- Districts of Norway
- Provinces of Sweden
- Subdivisions of the Nordic countries
- Administrative divisions of Denmark
