= Vendsyssel =

District of North Jutland, Denmark

Coordinates: 57°17′16″N 10°02′44″E

Vendsyssel (Danish pronunciation: [ˈvenˌsysl̩]) is the northernmost traditional district of Denmark and of Jutland. Being divided from mainland Jutland by the Limfjord, it is technically a part of the North Jutlandic Island which also comprises the areas Hanherred and Thy. Vendsyssel is part of the North Denmark Region.

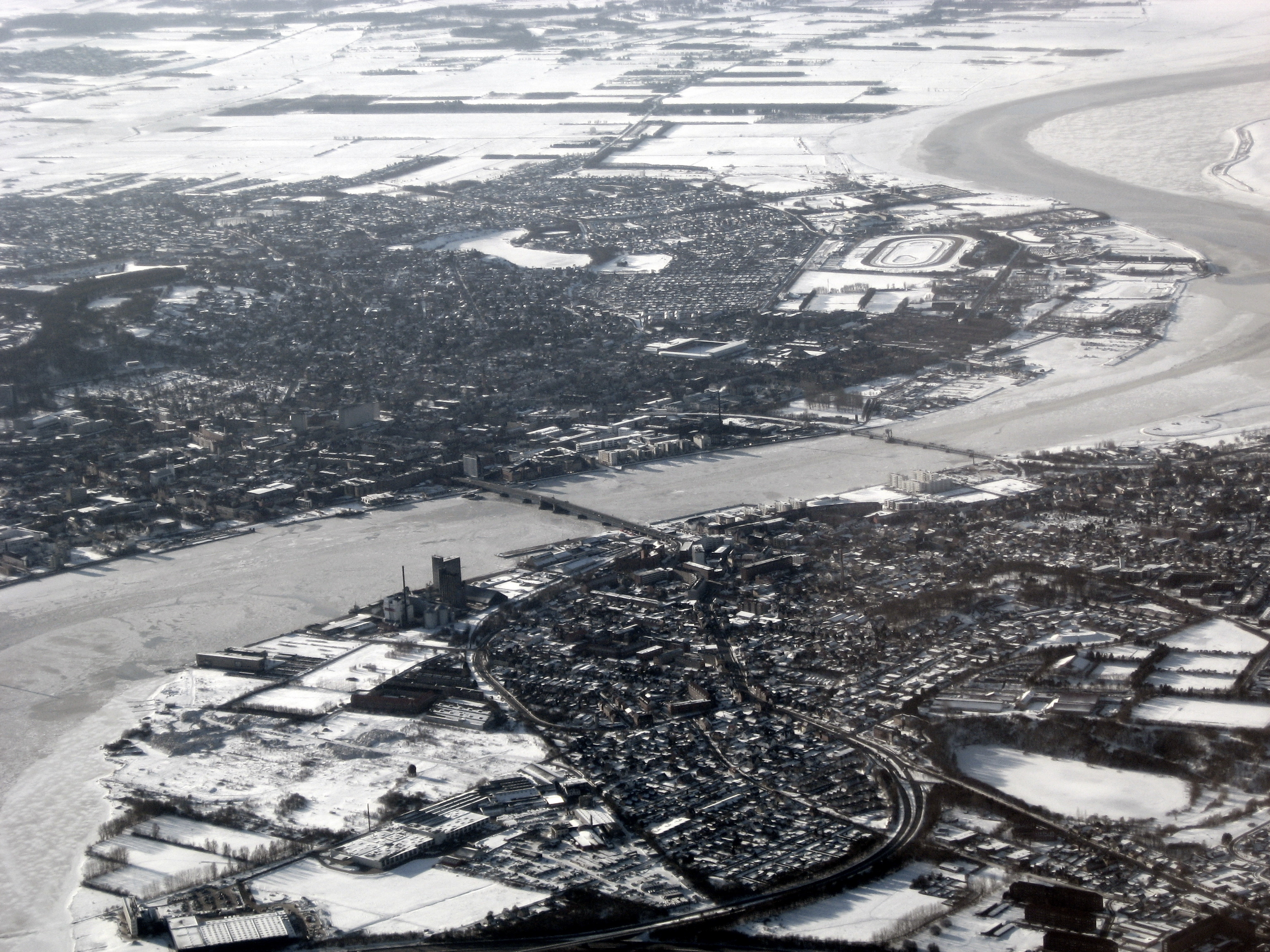
Limfjord separating Vendsyssel from mainland Jutland

Vendsyssel neighbours Hanherred to the southwest and Himmerland to the south, across the Limfjord. Whether the island Læsø is also a part of Vendsyssel, is a matter of definition. The major towns of Vendsyssel are Hjørring, Frederikshavn, Brønderslev, Sæby, Hirtshals, Løkken Vodskov, and, on its northern tip, Skagen. The dominating city is, however, Aalborg which is mainly situated outside Vendsyssel on the southern shore of the Limfjord with Nørresundby as a secondary, northern centre.

== Etymology ==
Adam of Bremen (ca. 1075) calls Vendsyssel Wendila, Ælnoth (ca. 1100) calls it Wendel, the Icelandic literature Vendill or Vandill. Derived from this is the ethnic name wændlar, Danish vendelboer, which is part of the name of the syssel. In the Danish Census Book (Kong Valdemars Jordebog, ca. 1231) Wændlesysæl, Wendelsysel, Wændil. Presumably originally the name of the Limfjord, then name of the region north of it.

According to historians and linguists, the name Vendsyssel may be derived from the Germanic tribe of the Vandals. Syssel is an ancient form of administrative region. Vendel (Old Danish Wændil) was also the ancient name of the Limfjord itself.

== Places of interest ==
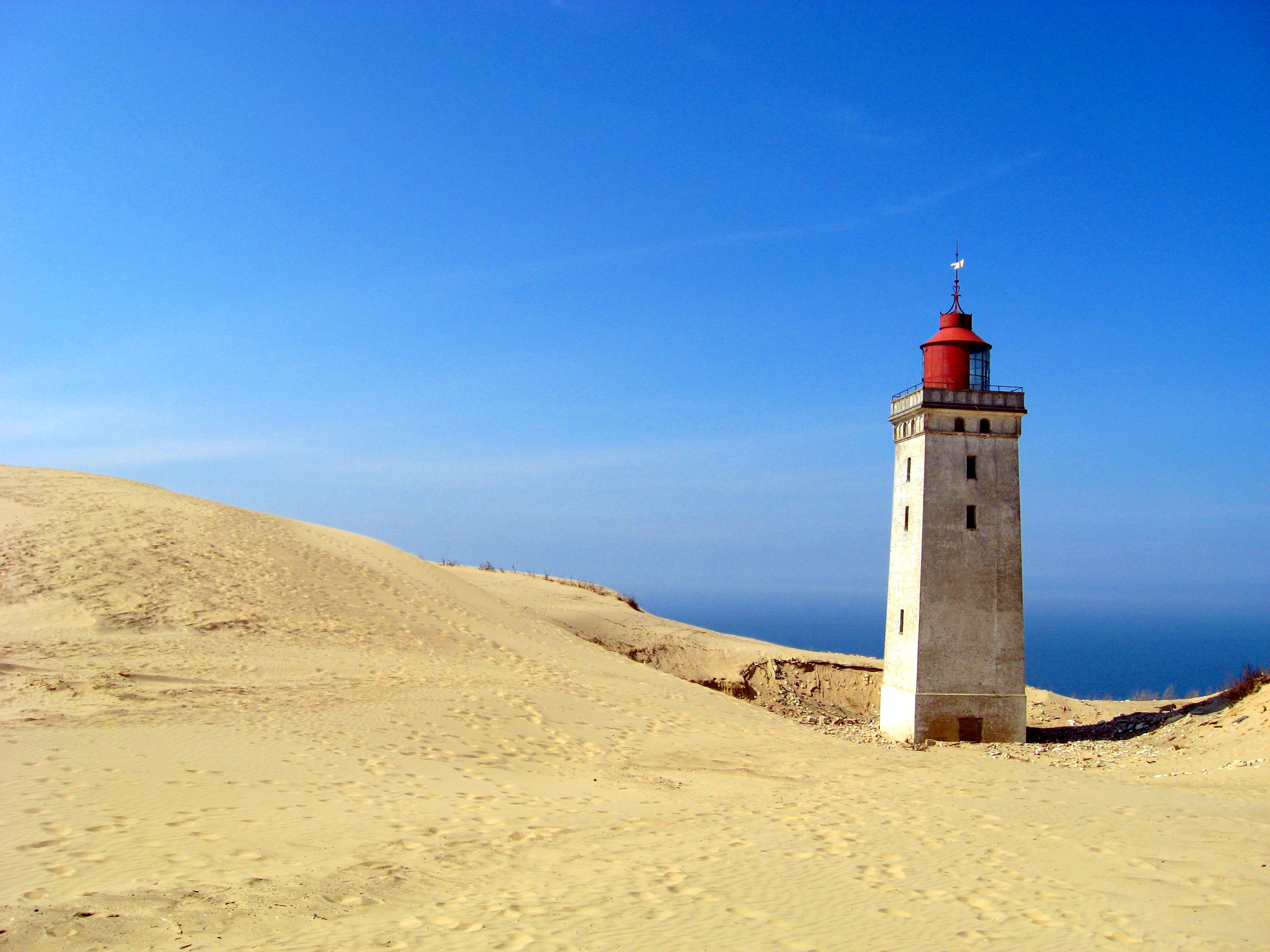
Rubjerg Knude lighthouse

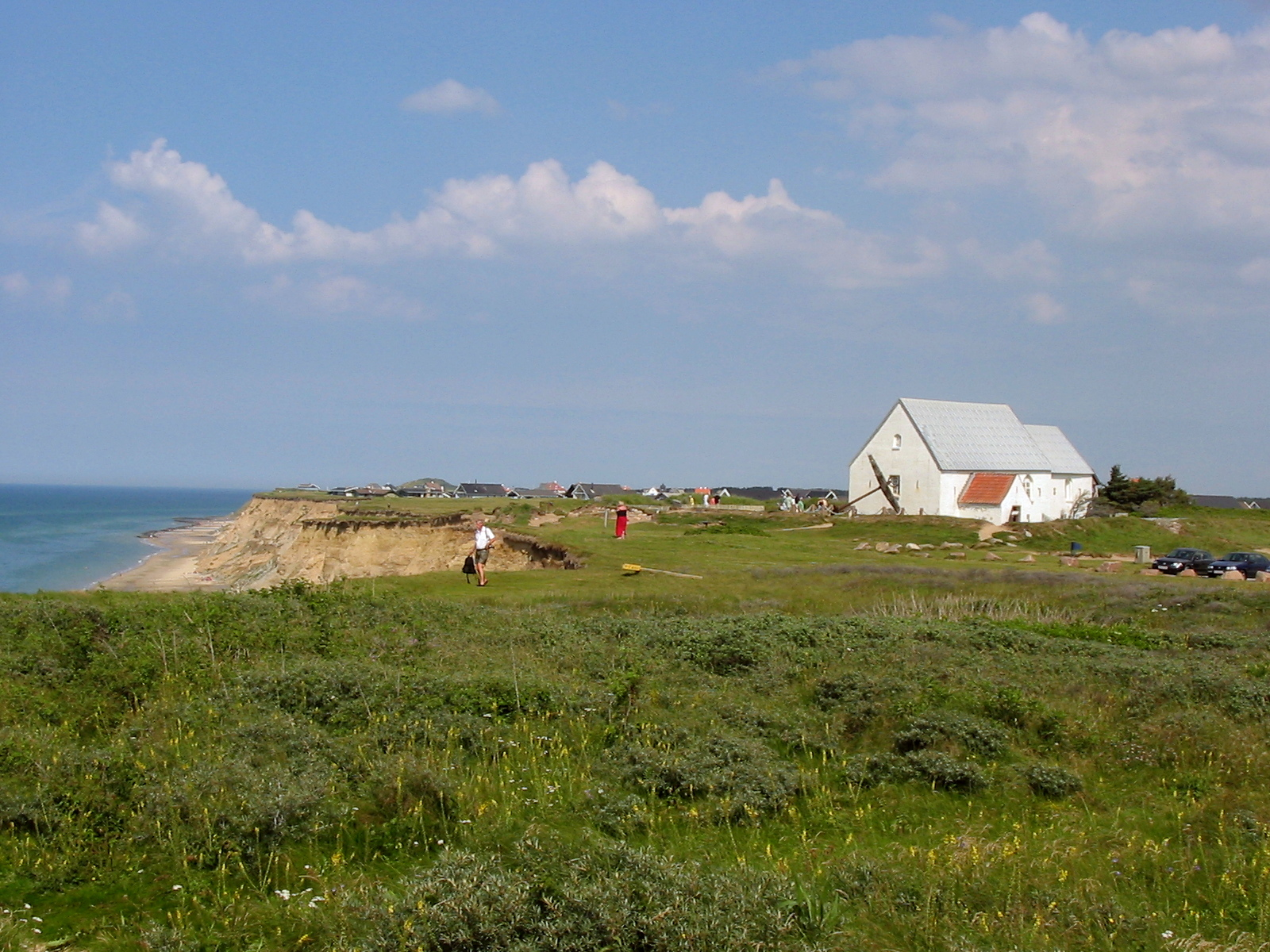
Mårup Church

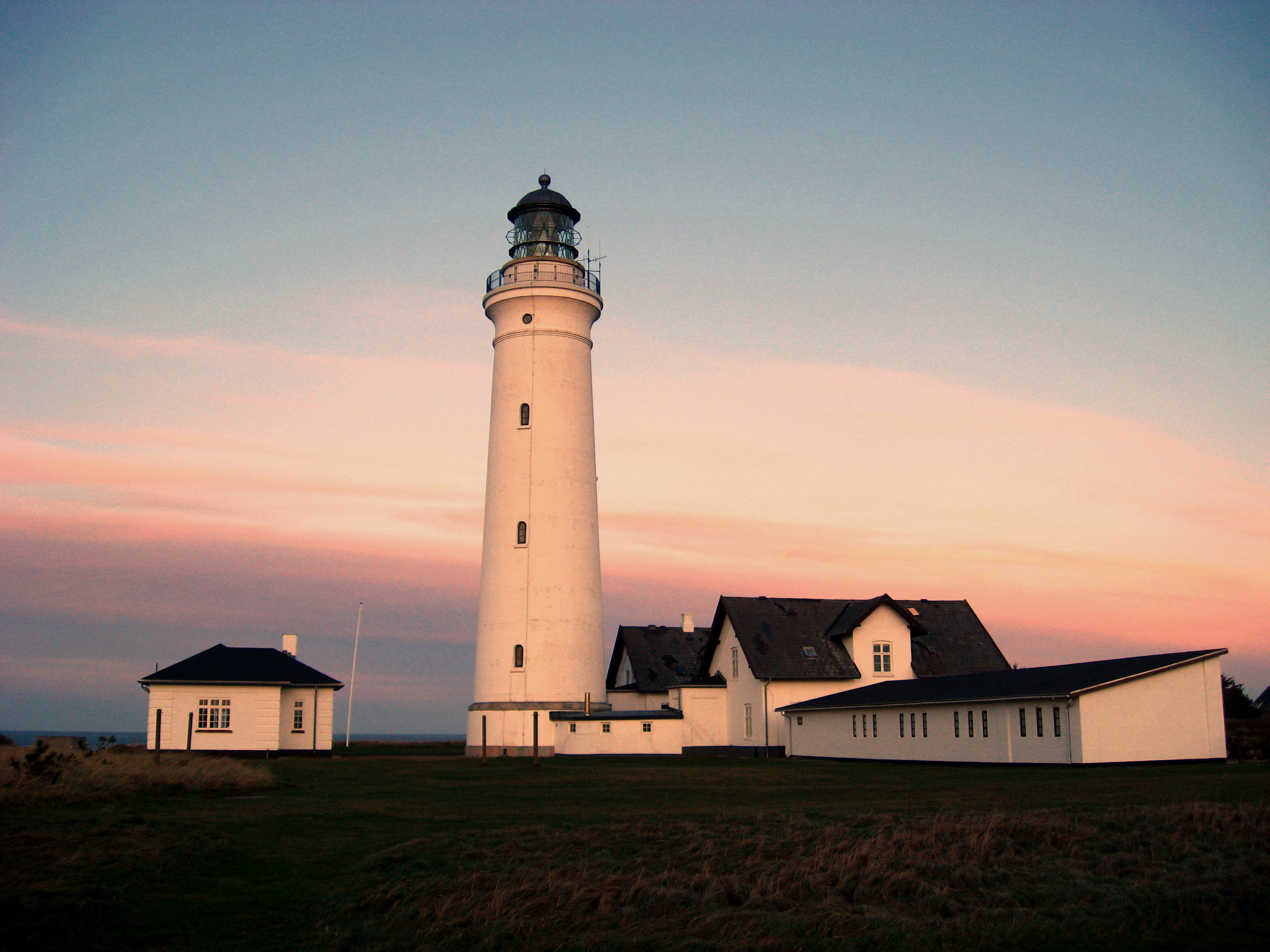
Hirtshals lighthouse

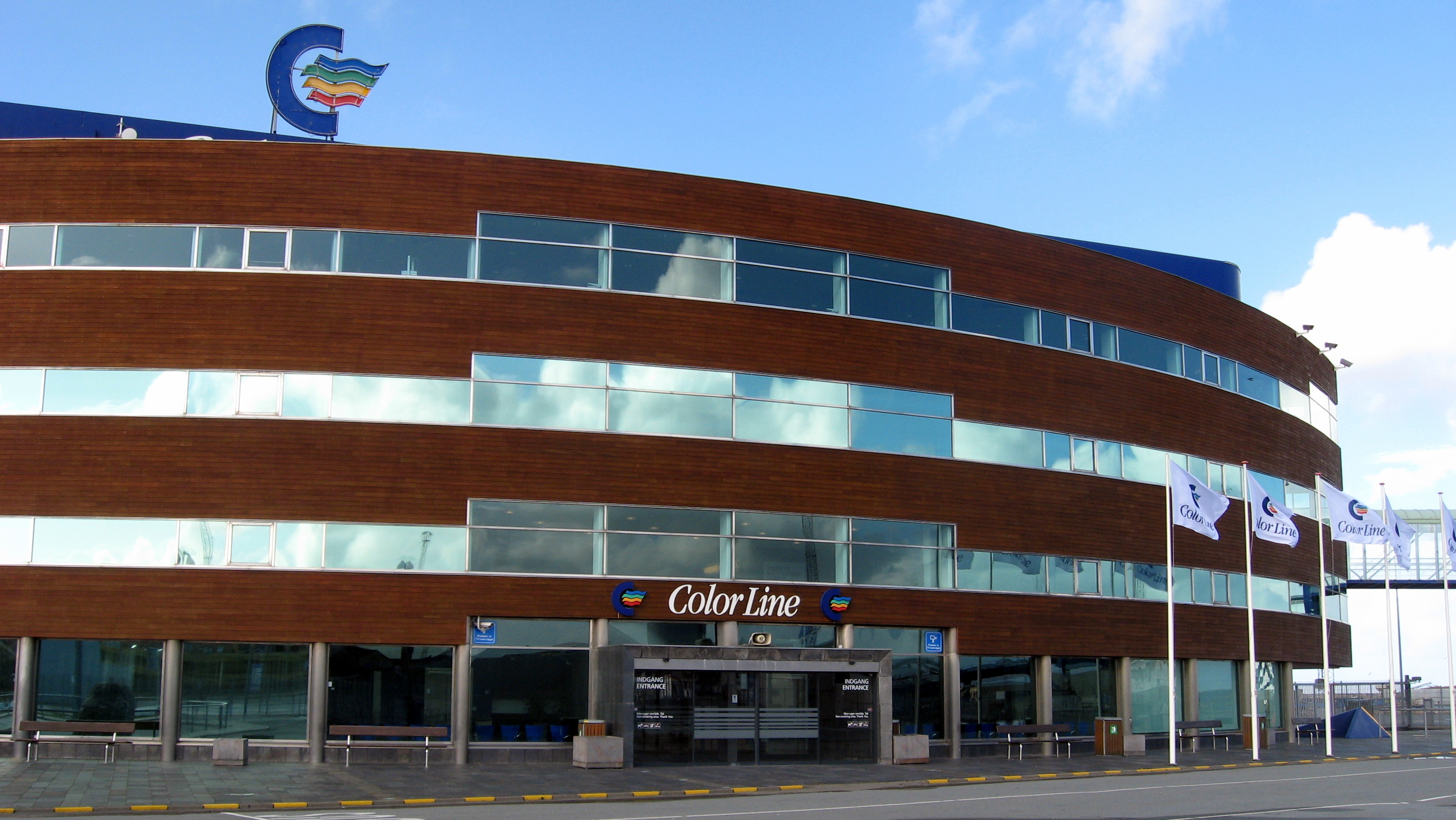
Color Line ferry terminal in Hirtshals

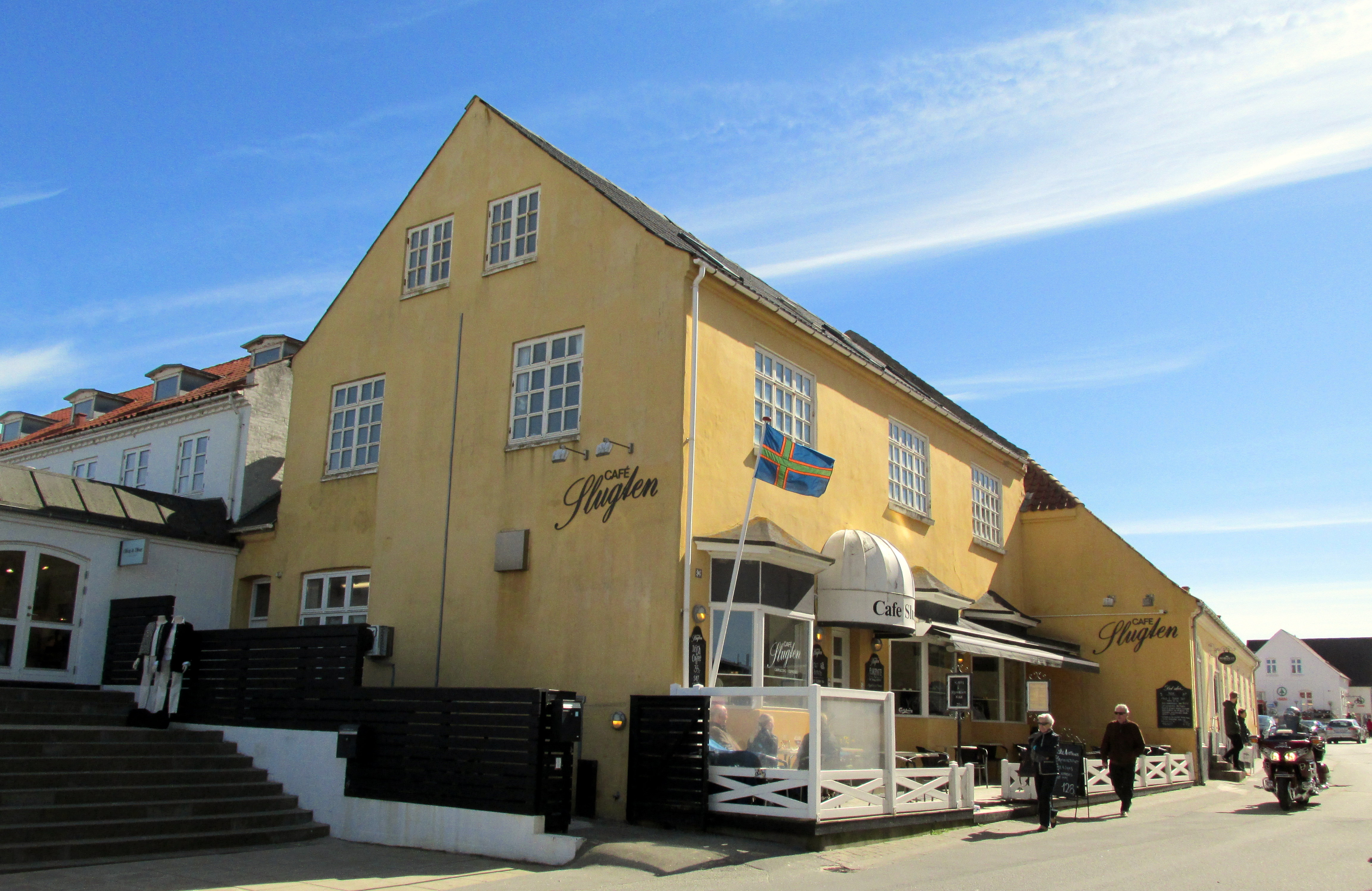
Flag of Vendsyssel in Lønstrup, 2015

- Hirtshals lighthouse
- North Sea Oceanarium
- Rubjerg Knude lighthouse
- Vendsyssel Historical Museum

== Events ==
The largest classical music festival in Scandinavia is the Vendsyssel Festival in the summer.

== Infrastructure ==
Vendsyssel is an important gatehead for transport from the European continent to Norway and Western Sweden. The European routes E39 and E45 cross the area as motorways. National route 11 connects Vendsyssel with Hanherred and Thy before crossing the Limfjord to western Jutland on the Oddesund Bridge. Danish national road 40 also passes through Vendsyssel.

=== Bridges ===
Vendsyssel is linked to mainland Jutland by bridges and a tunnel:

- Limfjord Railroad Bridge (in Aalborg, linking Vendsyssel to the rail network)
- Limfjord Bridge (road, linking Nørresundby to central Aalborg)
- Limfjord Tunnel (motorway E45, east of Aalborg)
- A further bridge crossing the Limfjord west of Aalborg (carrying the E39) has been proposed.

=== Railways ===
- Skagen-Frederikshavn-Hjørring-Brønderslev-Aalborg, Nordjyske Jernbaner, single track, hourly Intercity trains. From Aalborg there are connections to Århus and Copenhagen
- Hjørring-Hirtshals, local railway (and transit to Norway) operated by Nordjyske Jernbaner

=== Ferries ===
To Sweden:

- Frederikshavn-Gothenburg (also for railway freight cars)

To Norway:

- Hirtshals-Kristiansand (also for railway freight cars)
- Hirtshals-Larvik
- Hirtshals-Stavanger
- Hirtshals-Bergen
- Hirtshals-Oslo
- Hirtshals-Langesund
- Frederikshavn-Oslo

To mainland Jutland:

- Hals-Egense (crossing the eastern mouth of the Limfjord)

To the island of Læsø:

- Frederikshavn-Læsø

To the Faroe Islands:

- Hirtshals-Tórshavn

=== Airports ===
- Aalborg Airport (international)
- Sindal Airport (currently no scheduled routes)
