= Hardsyssel =

District in Denmark

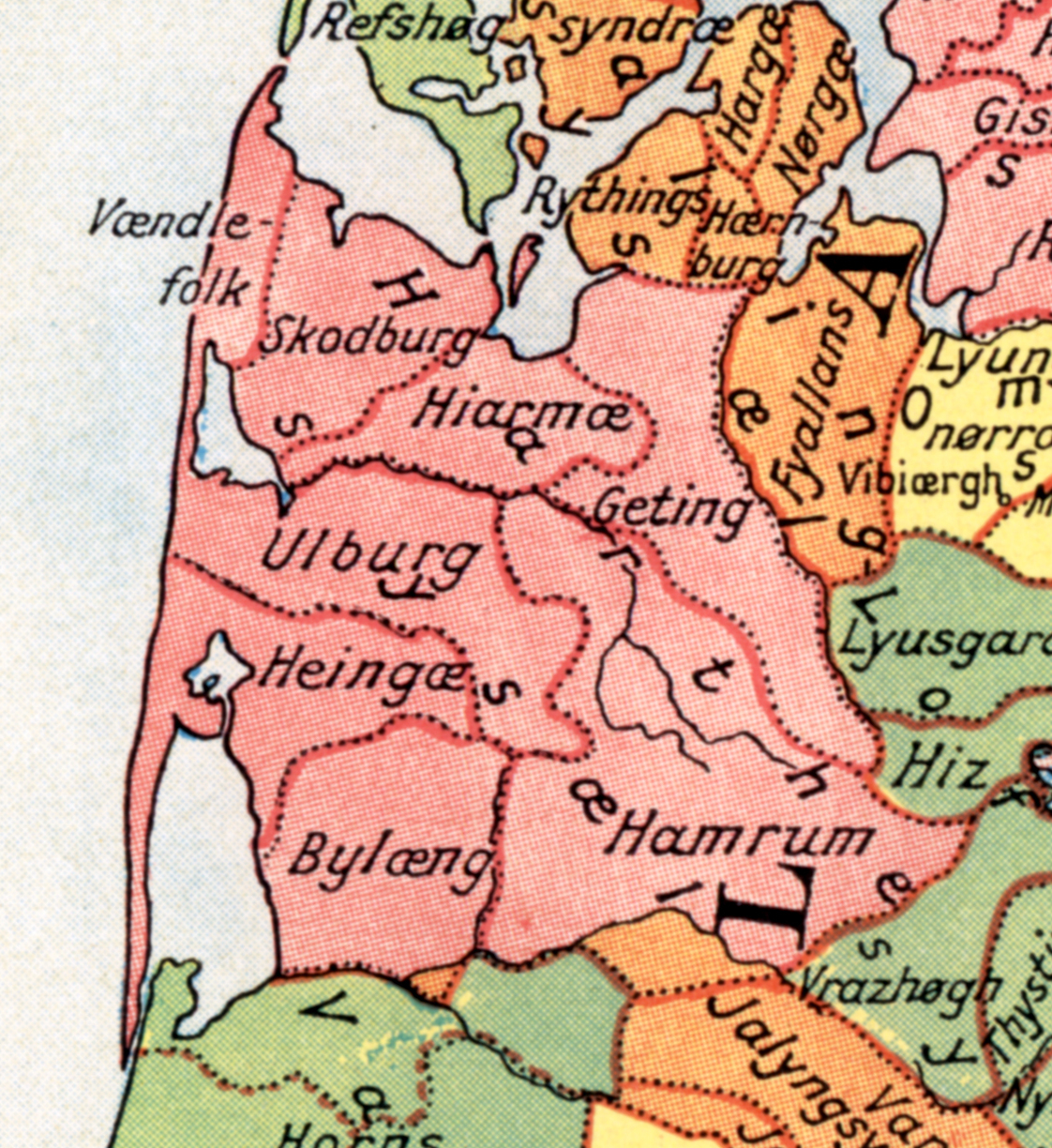
Hardsyssel

Hardsyssel or Harsyssel is a traditional district and an ancient syssel in Denmark, forming the western part of central Jutland. Hardsyssel is roughly identical with the former Ringkjøbing County. Today it forms the western half of Region Midtjylland. The biggest towns in Hardsyssel are Herning, Holstebro, Struer, Ringkøbing, Skjern, Lemvig and Ikast. The name Hardsyssel is today less commonly used than before, as most people refer to Western Jutland or Central Jutland, areas with no strict borders.

The name is believed to be derived from the Germanic stem of the Harudes, as are the county and the traditional district of Hordaland and Hardanger in Norway. The German district of Harz has its name from the same origin. An inhabitant of Hardsyssel is a harder or a harbo. The dialect of Hardsyssel belongs to the West Jutlandic group.

The landscape is flatter and more open than that of eastern Denmark, marked by sandy soil, heath and some conifer plantations. From the Middle Ages until the 19th century it was quite sparsely inhabited. After Denmark's loss of Slesvig and Holstein in 1864, it was decided to claim much of the infertile land for agriculture, but some of the heaths remain. Significant industry didn't arrive until the 1960s. Some of the greatest companies today are Vestas (windmills), B&O (radio and television) and Cheminova (pesticides).

== See also ==
- Traditional districts of Denmark
