= Lønstrup =

- Town
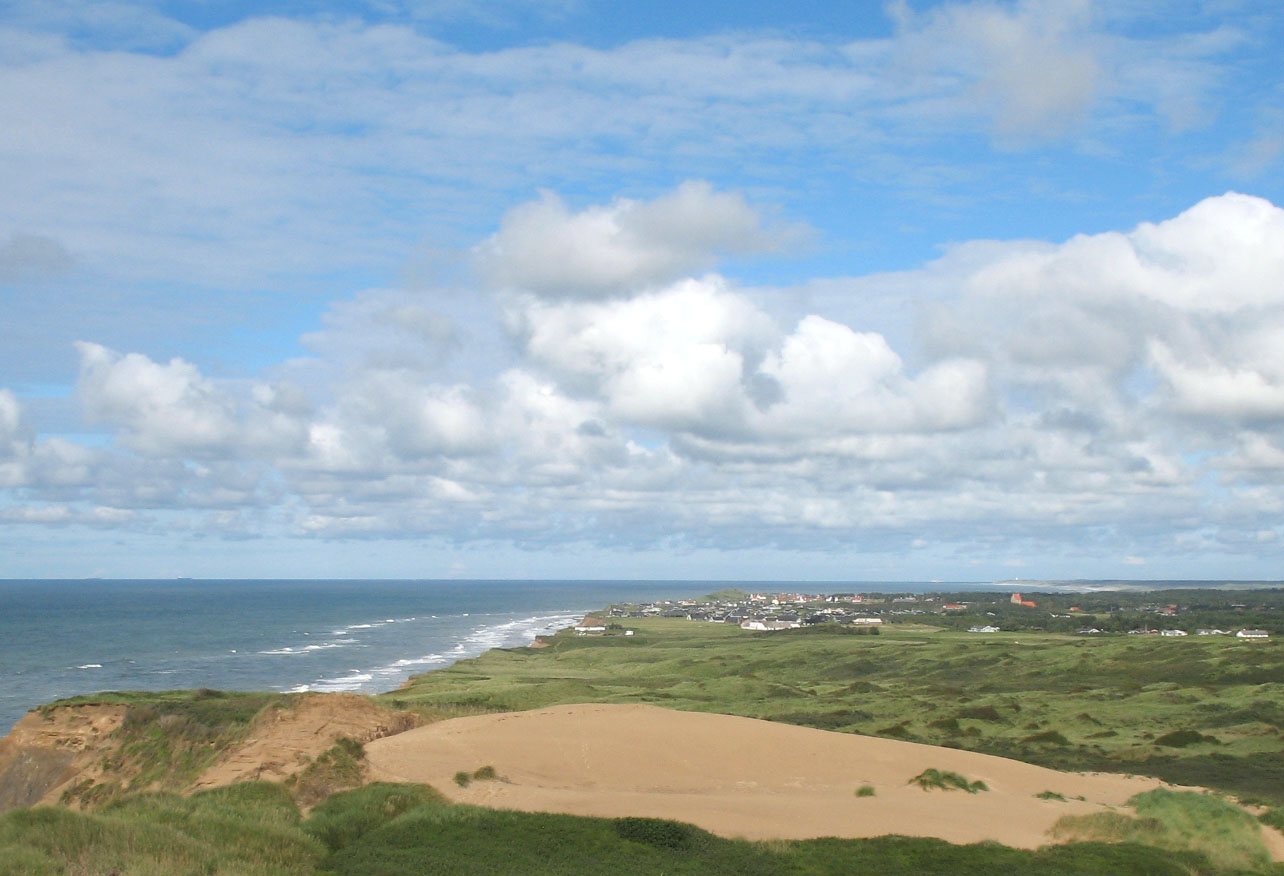
- Lønstrup seen from the dunes at Rubjerg Knude lighthouse

- Location within North Jutland Region Location within Denmark
- Coordinates: 57°28′8″N 9°47′57″E
- Country: Denmark
- Region: North Jutland Region
- Municipality: Hjørring Municipality

Population (2026)
  - Total: 544

Lønstrup is a small town in northern Denmark, in Vendsyssel on the coast of Skagerrak. It is located in north Jutland, Hjørring Municipality and is an old fishing village, with a population of 544 (as of January 1. 2026). The area is known for its constantly changing coastline, caused by shifting sands and erosion.

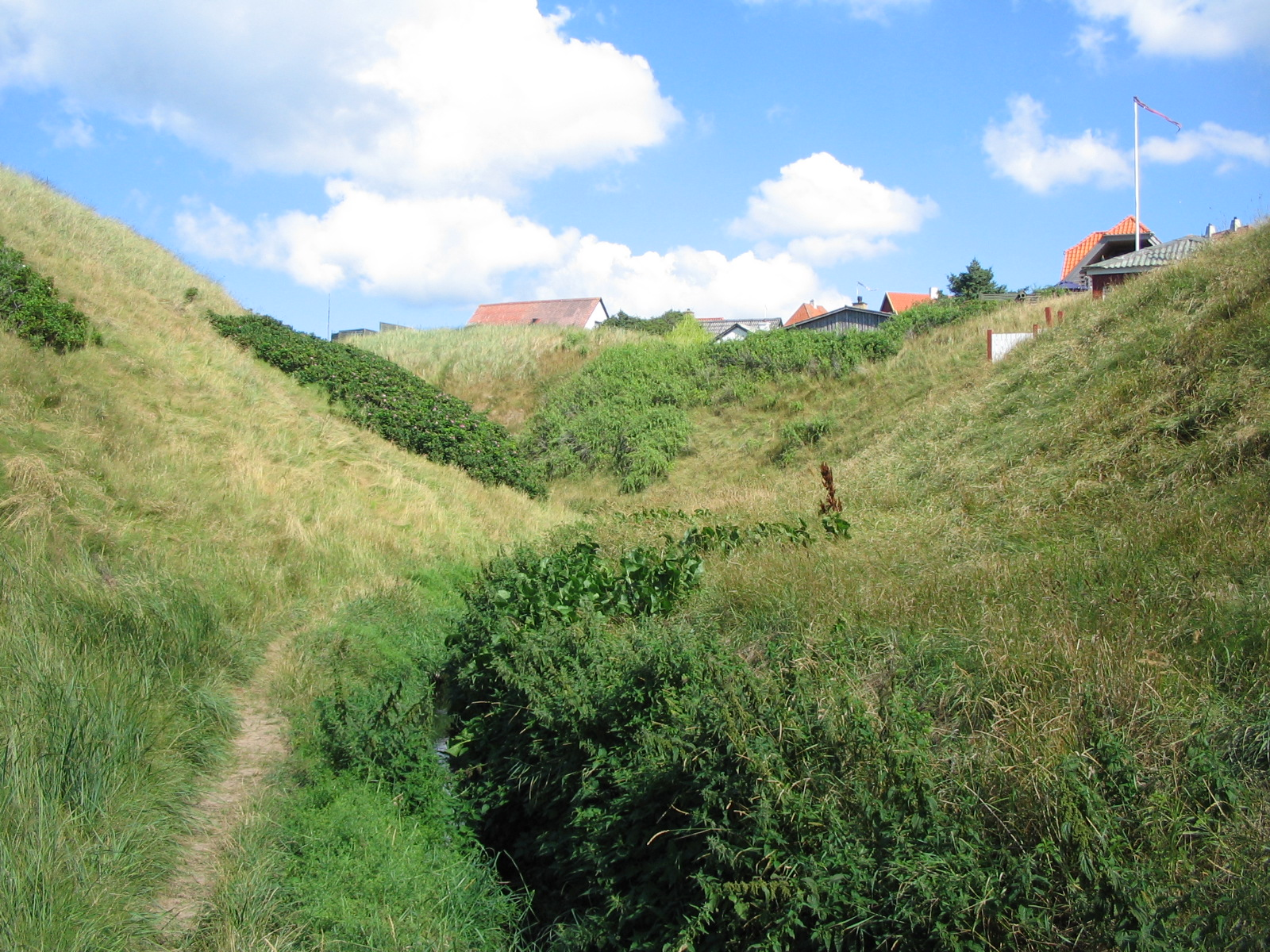
Bækslugten ravine caused by a storm in 1877

== Description ==
On August 11, 1877, a violent storm that started at noon and lasted 1.5 hours turned the Lønstrup brook into a ravine that was 360 meters long, 15 meters wide and 4.5 meters deep (1180 ft long, 49 ft wide and 15 ft deep). Fishermen who were at sea during the storm knew nothing about the disaster at home until they saw parts of the destroyed houses, furniture and household items floating in the water. Six houses were torn from their foundations, four were demolished and two others were uninhabitable and had to be razed. The ravine, now known as Bækslugten, still cuts through town.

Lønstrup drew interest among Danes when it was used as a backdrop for the Oscar-winning Babette's Feast (Danish: Babettes gæstebud), a 1987 Danish drama directed by Gabriel Axel.

Lønstrup consists mainly of one long road, Strandvejen (Beach Way), which meanders a few kilometers through the steep cliffs. The hills around the north of Lønstrup are dotted with summer cottages built around 1920. The area in and around Lønstrup attracts some 10,000 tourists a week during the summer season.

Previously, many families in Lønstrup lived from fishing, but now there are only a few. Lønstrup is now better known for its many crafts studios and art galleries. There are glass blowers, potteries, jewelers, amber crafts, painters and sculptors who live and work in Lønstrup.

A violent storm in 1981 prompted the establishment of better coastal protection, which is working as intended but, because the North Sea erodes the coastline, the beach nonetheless requires fresh sand to be spread out on the beach every year.

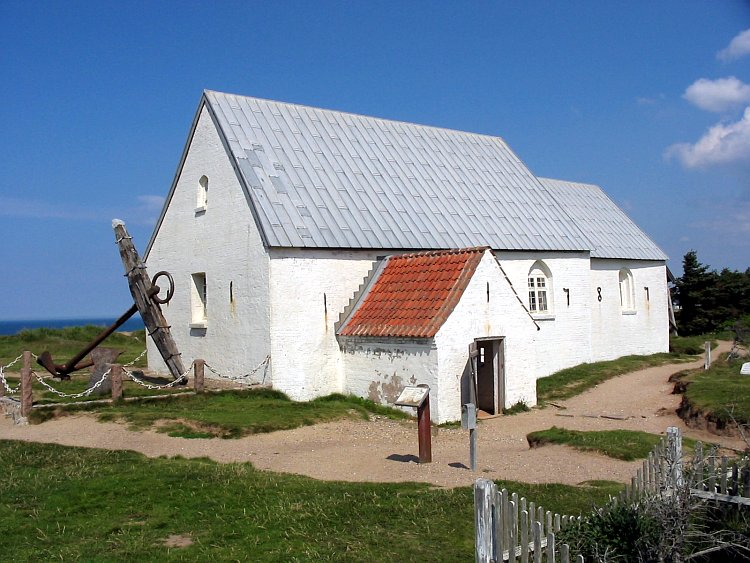
Mårup Church near Lønstrup, seen before it was dismantled

== Places of interest ==
Just south of Lønstrup is the site of the former Mårup Church, a medieval church that was partially dismantled in 2008 after hundreds of years of coastal erosion had endangered the church. Built around 1250, it may have originally been 1 kilometer (0.62 mi) from the coast, but erosion had put the sea just meters away. South of that is another abandoned structure, the Rubjerg Knude lighthouse. Partially buried in sand, the lighthouse was built at the turn of the 20th century.

== See also ==
- Rubjerg Knude lighthouse
