= Bulbjerg =

Coordinates: 57°9′30″N 9°1′29″E

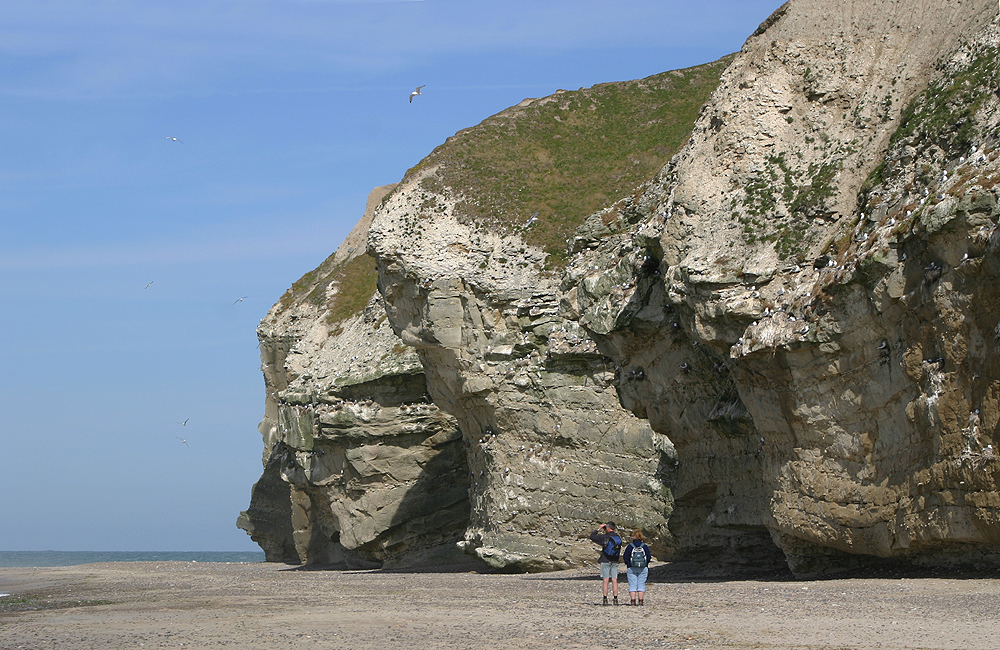
Bulbjerg

Bulbjerg is a limestone cliff in northern Jutland, Denmark, facing Skagerrak. It is the only rock formation in Jutland, the only bird cliff on the Danish mainland, and as such the only breeding place of the black-legged kittiwake on the Danish mainland. Bulbjerg lies in the traditional district of Hanherred, close to Thy.

== History ==
For centuries, chalk blocks were sawed out of the cliff and used as a building material in the surrounding area or burnt to quicklime. Former visitors have carved their names in the limestone, including a 19th-century king whose name can still be seen. During World War II, the German occupation force used Bulbjerg as a lookout point and built a small concrete fortification which still exists.

=== Skarreklit ===
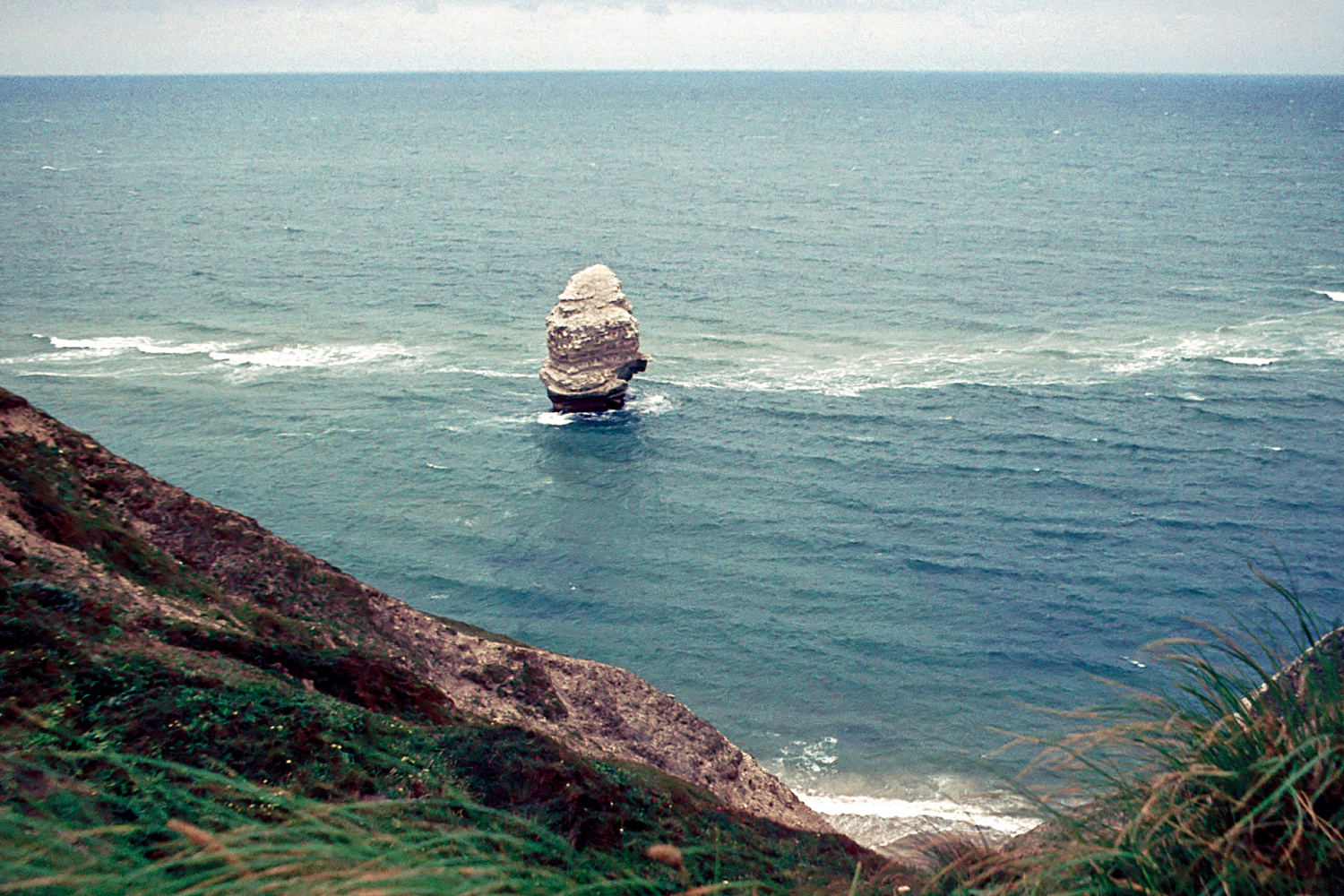
Skarreklit in August 1977

Skarreklit was a rock column in the sea about 100 metres off Bulbjerg. It fell down in a storm in 1978, but its base can be seen at low tide and calm sea. The base of the column was flint, allowing the column to withstand the forces of the waves, long after the sea had eroded the softer limestone around it. According to a legend, the fall of the column would mean the end of the world. Skarreklit is presumably named after the cormorant (Danish: skarv, Jutlandic dialect: skar); klit means 'dune', in Jutlandic also 'cliff'.

== Gallery ==
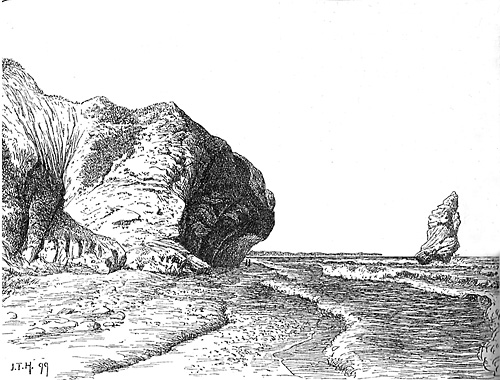
Skarreklit (to the right) at the end of the 19th century

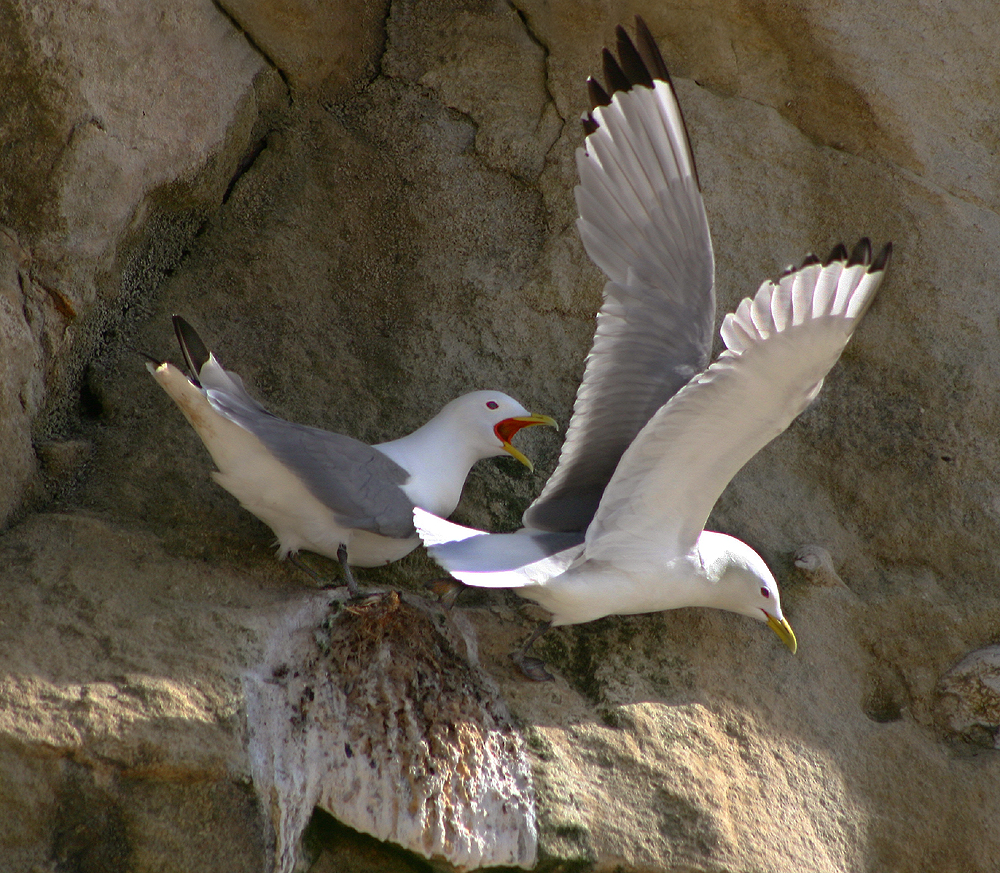
Kittiwakes at Bulbjerg

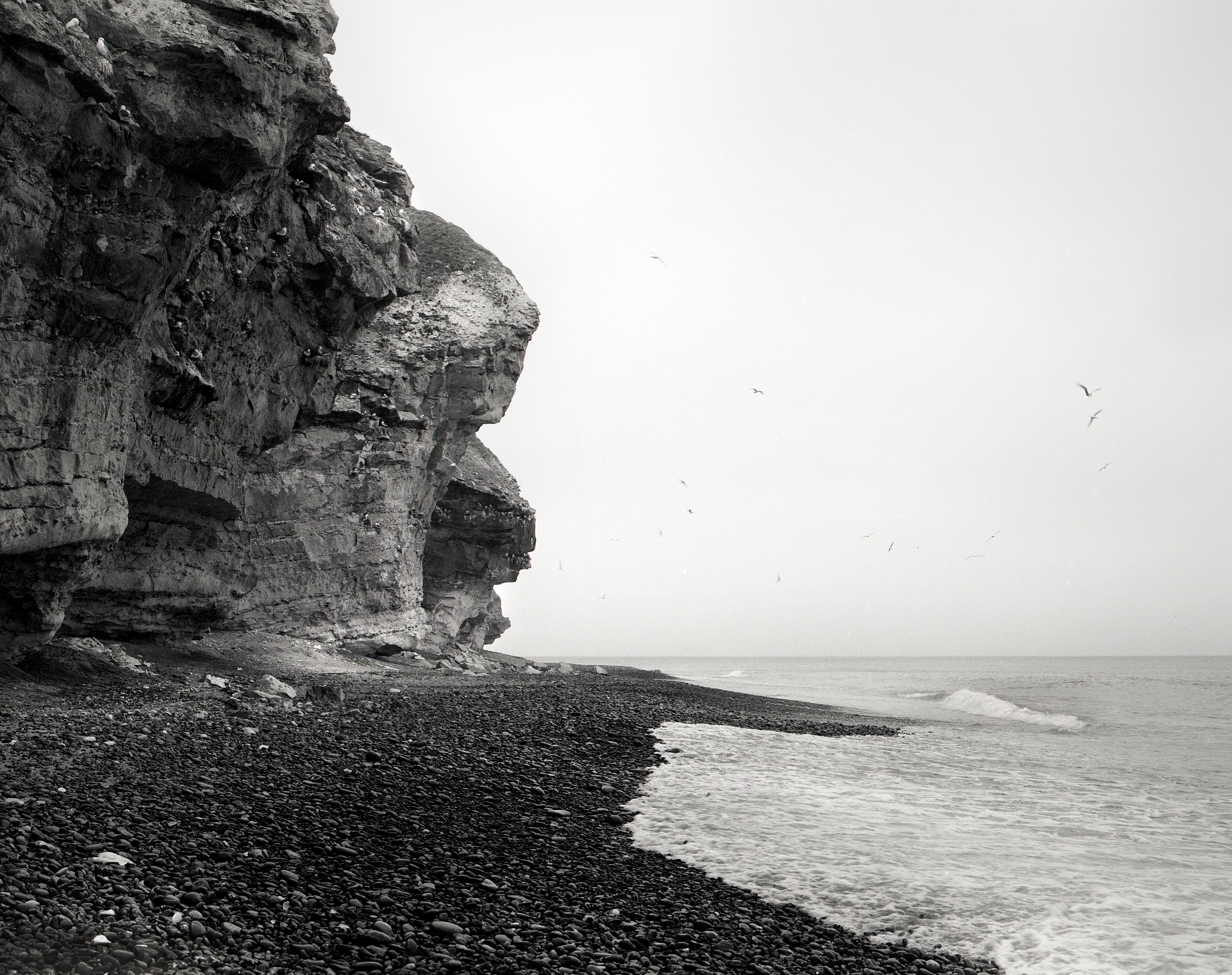
Bulbjerg in 2013

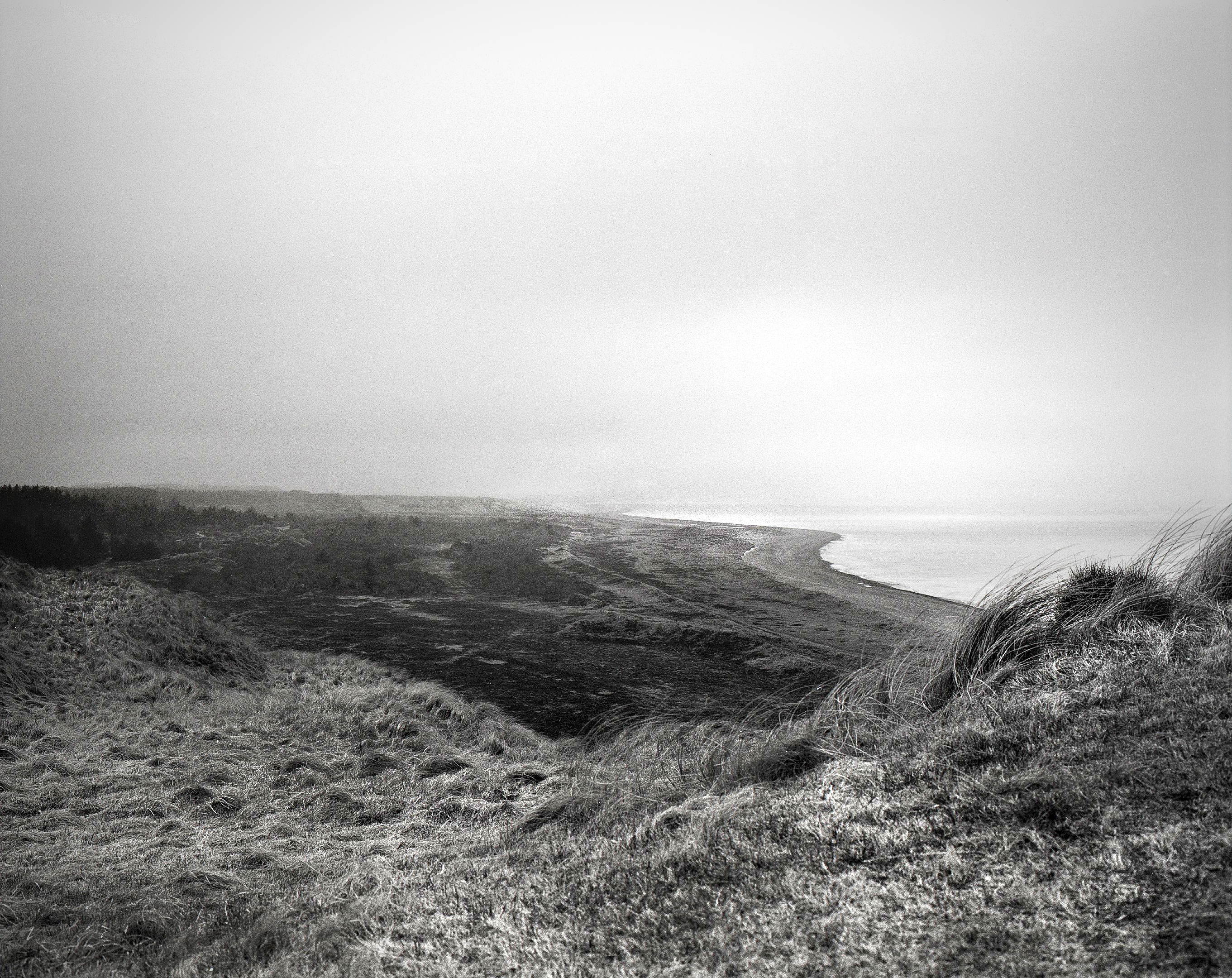
View of Jammerbugt with Bulbjerg on right horizon

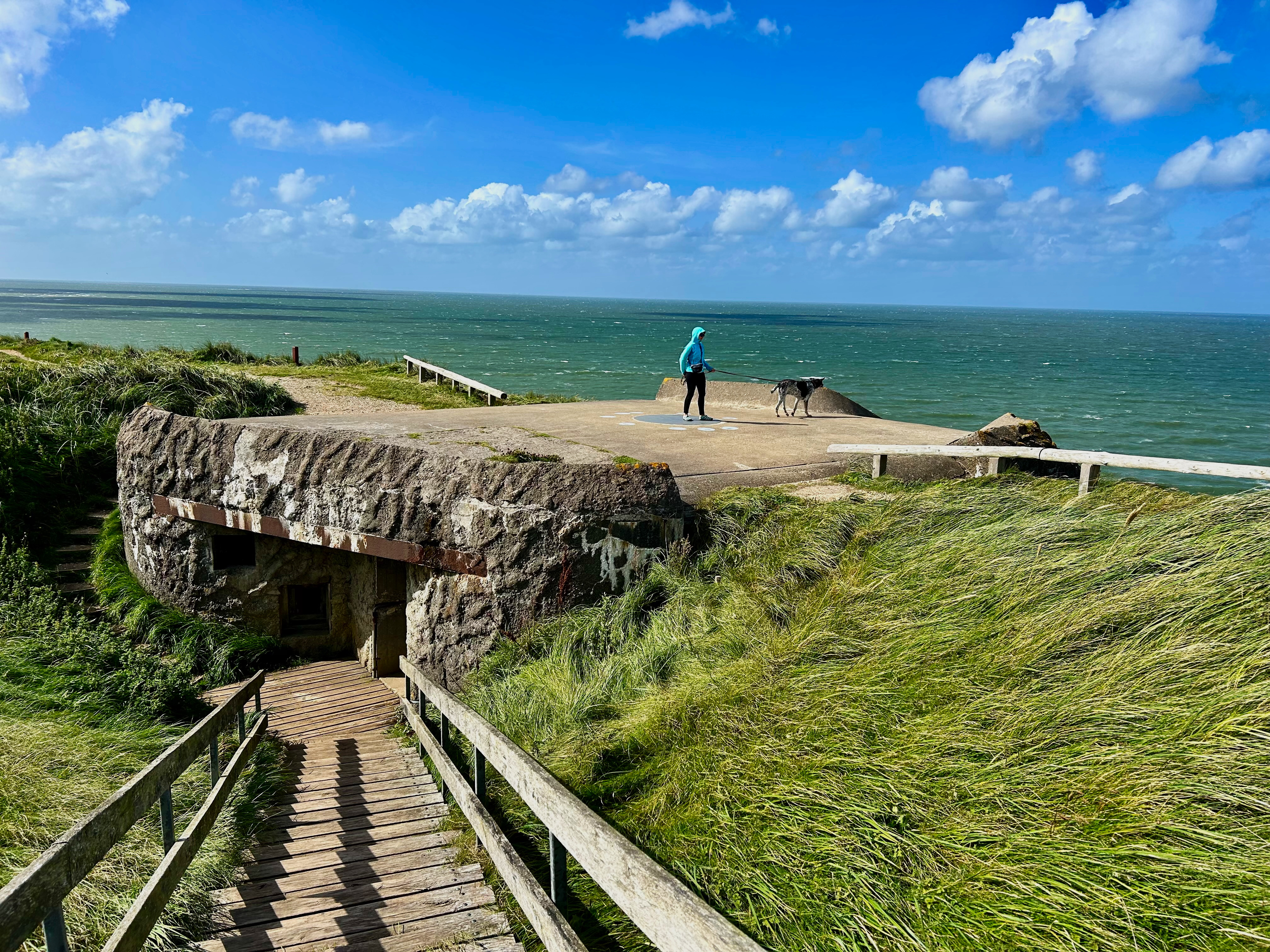
Bulbjerg bunker
