= Limfjordstunnelen =

Tunnel in Denmark

Coordinates: 57.056944°N 9.957222°E

Limfjordstunnelen (The Limfjord Tunnel) is a Danish motorway tunnel which connects the highway in eastern Aalborg with the highway east of Nørresundby. Opened 6 May 1969, it was the country's first motorway tunnel. The tunnel measures 582 metres (1,909 ft) in length, and 27.4 metres (90 ft) in width. Limfjordstunnelen comprises a 6-lane motorway, which is part of the E45. Comprising a segment of the North Jutland Motorway, it passes under the shallow sound of Limfjorden. It is one of three permanent links between Vendsyssel and Himmerland, the other two being Limfjordsbroen in central Aalborg and Jernbanebroen over Limfjorden, the railway bridge, slightly west of the city center. The tunnel has had several problems with water intrusion. This problem was discovered a few years after opening and was caused by improper sealing. In 1996–97, the tunnel was sporadically closed to traffic for rectification of the concrete and for reinforcement, which in turn was plagued by rust.
