= Mårup Church =

Church in Denmark

Coordinates: 57°27′45″N 9°47′06″E

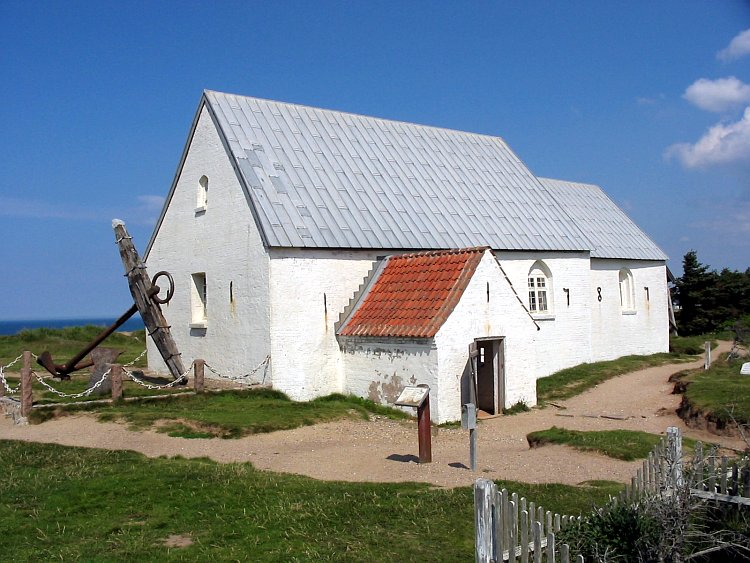
Mårup church before it was partially dismantled

Mårup Church (Danish: Mårup Kirke) was a Romanesque church in Vendsyssel in Denmark's northern Jutland. The church was built on Lønstrup Klint, a cliff on the North Sea near the town of Lønstrup in the Hjørring municipality. The area is noted for its windswept landscape, constantly shifting sands and eroding coastline. After hundreds of years of erosion brought the North Sea dangerously close, the church was partially dismantled in 2008 to prevent its falling into the sea. The walls remain at the site, along with the anchor of a British frigate that sank off the coast in 1808.

== The church and nature ==
Mårup Church was built around 1250 in the late Romanesque style. It was a simple brick structure typical of Jutland village churches, consisting of nave and choir. A tower existing in the 18th century was demolished and a free-standing bell tower was erected of wood. The church had arched pilasters, some of which can still be seen.

On 6 December 1808 HMS Crescent, a British frigate on its way to Gothenburg, Sweden, sank while bringing supplies to the Royal Navy during the Napoleonic Wars. More than 200 sailors were buried in a common grave; seven officers and 55 seamen survived. Two additional British ships sank off Denmark's west coast and the British installed a tablet to honor the dead in 1895.

The church was built in the middle of the parish, about 1 kilometer (0.62 mi) from the coast. It was used until 1926, when a new church was built in nearby Lønstrup. The old building was maintained by the National Museum of Denmark, which took possession of the church in 1952. In 1998, extensive archaeological work was undertaken on the site. The church had preservation status until 2005, when it was terminated so that the building could be dismantled. The final church service was held Easter 2008.

Lønstrup Klint is geologically unique and has lost on average 1.5 meters (4.9 ft) to erosion per year for the past 300 years. While erosion continued to threaten the church, shifting sands have been burying the Rubjerg Knude lighthouse a short distance to the south. The lighthouse operated for just a few decades, while adjacent buildings were turned into a museum about the shifting sands. It was abandoned a few years later, but the lighthouse was moved further inland in 2019.

Heavy storms in the late 20th century and early 21st so harmed the coast that one corner of the church was damaged and by the mid-2000s, the sea was just 9 meters (30 ft) from the church. There were heated debates over what to do, whether to let nature take its course, or to take action and try to save the church. Danish firms tried to protect the coast and prevent sand erosion. In August 2007, after four years of discussion, the Danish National Museum, in view of the considerable cost and local public resistance, decided to relocate the church to an open-air museum. At the end of November 2007, the authorities responsible for culture and land protection decided to dismantle the church. In autumn 2008, the roof and interior of the church were removed and put in storage; the walls were left behind. In autumn 2011, the western wall was dismantled, leaving remnants of only three walls with an open view to the sea. In summer and autumn 2012, severe erosion north and south of the site caused large chunks of land to fall into the sea. By November 2012 the church rested a mere nine meters from the steep cliff, and authorities were monitoring the situation in order to determine when it would be necessary to dismantle more of the church. By May 2016 the church had been removed completely, and the anchor moved further inland, away from the eroding cliff edge.

== Dramatic location ==
In its windy setting on the North Sea, the church received some 300,000 visitors a year from around Denmark and other countries. Mårup Church was chosen as a location for the film Babette's Feast, based on the book by Isak Dinesen. The 1987 film by Gabriel Axel was the first Danish film to win the Academy Award for Best Foreign Language Film. The story takes place in Norway, but Axel preferred the dramatic landscape around Mårup Church.

Photos of Mårup church and remains

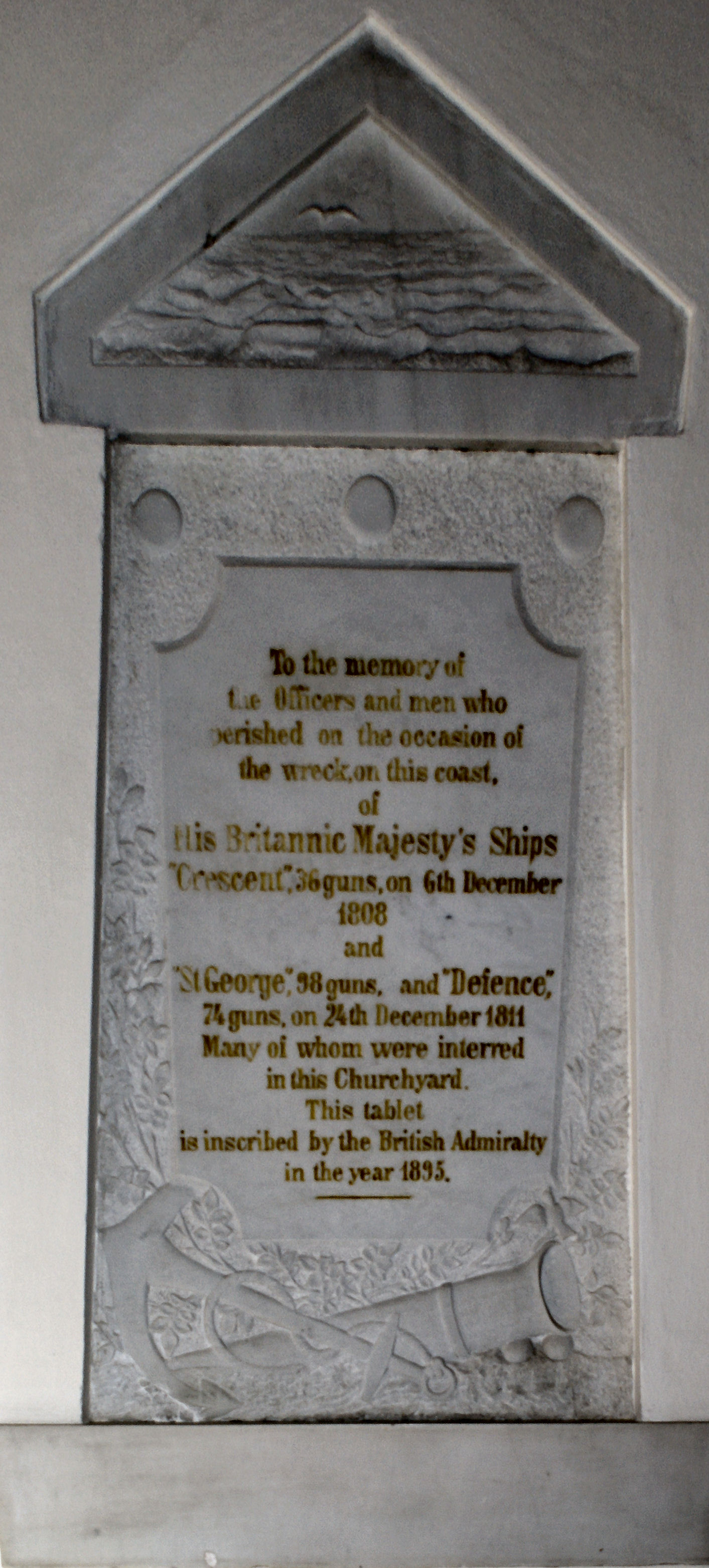
British tablet in memory of HMS Crescent

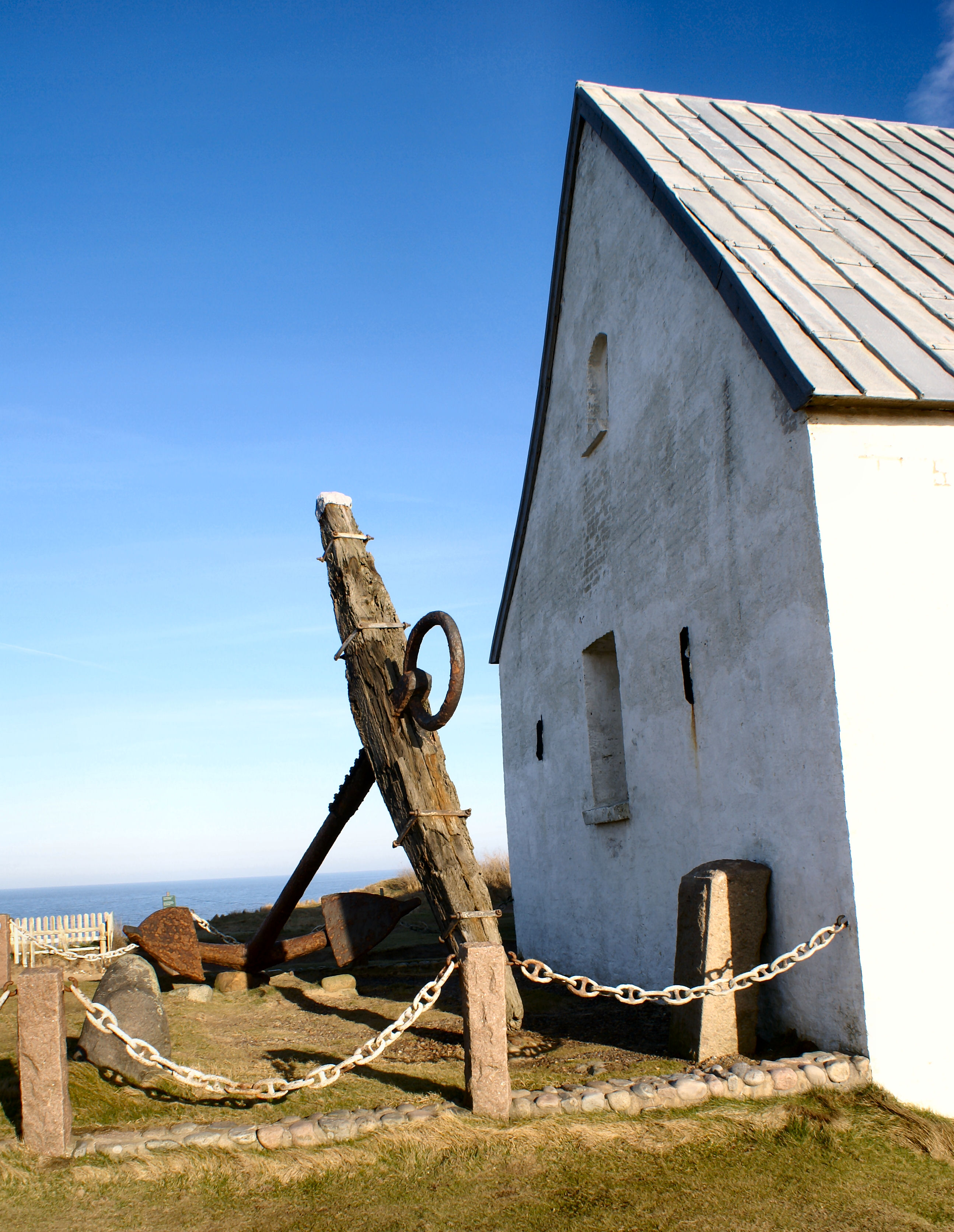
Anchor from HMS Crescent, February 2008

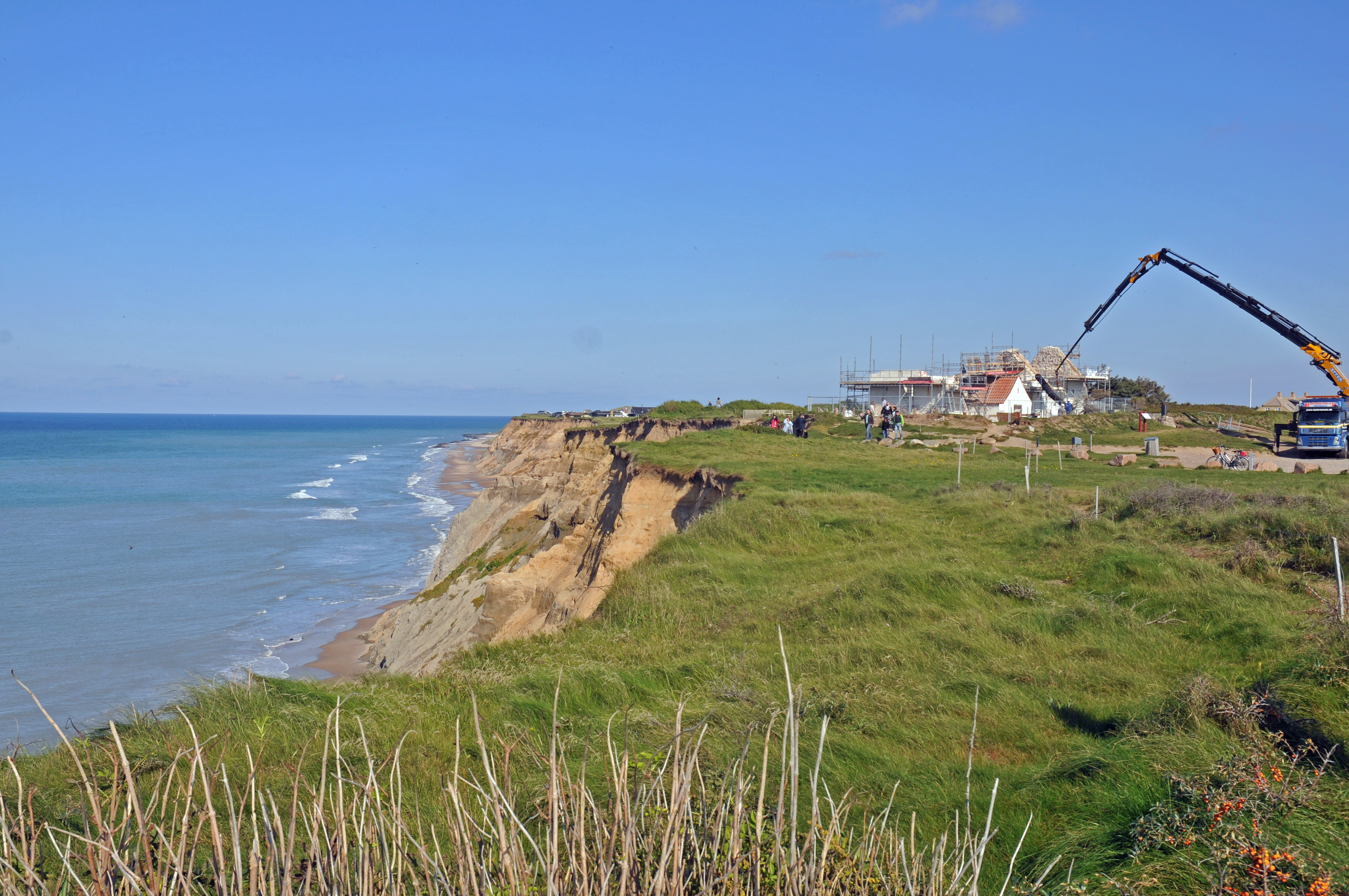
Demolition of the church, September 2008

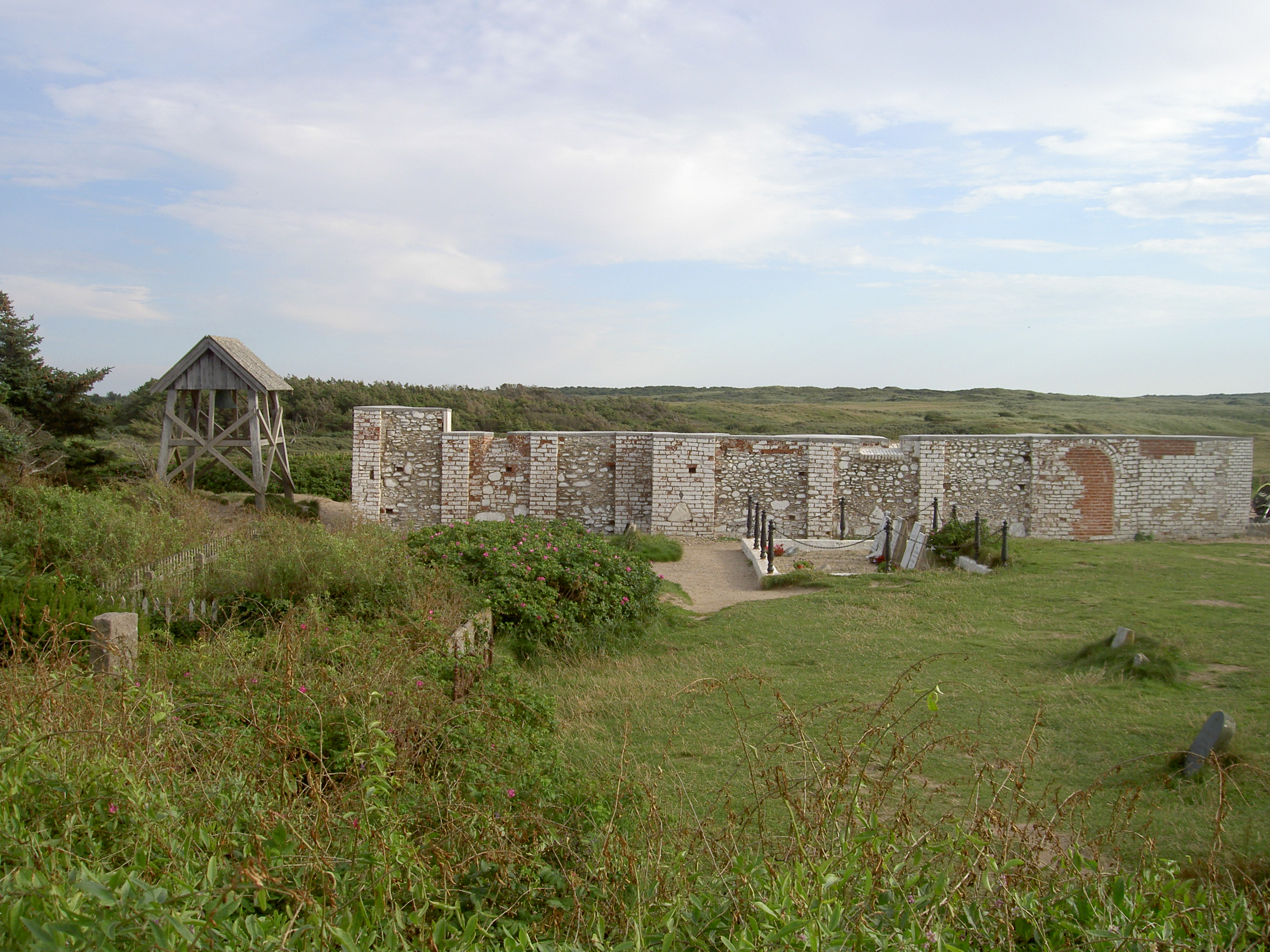
Walls of the church with graveyard, August 2009

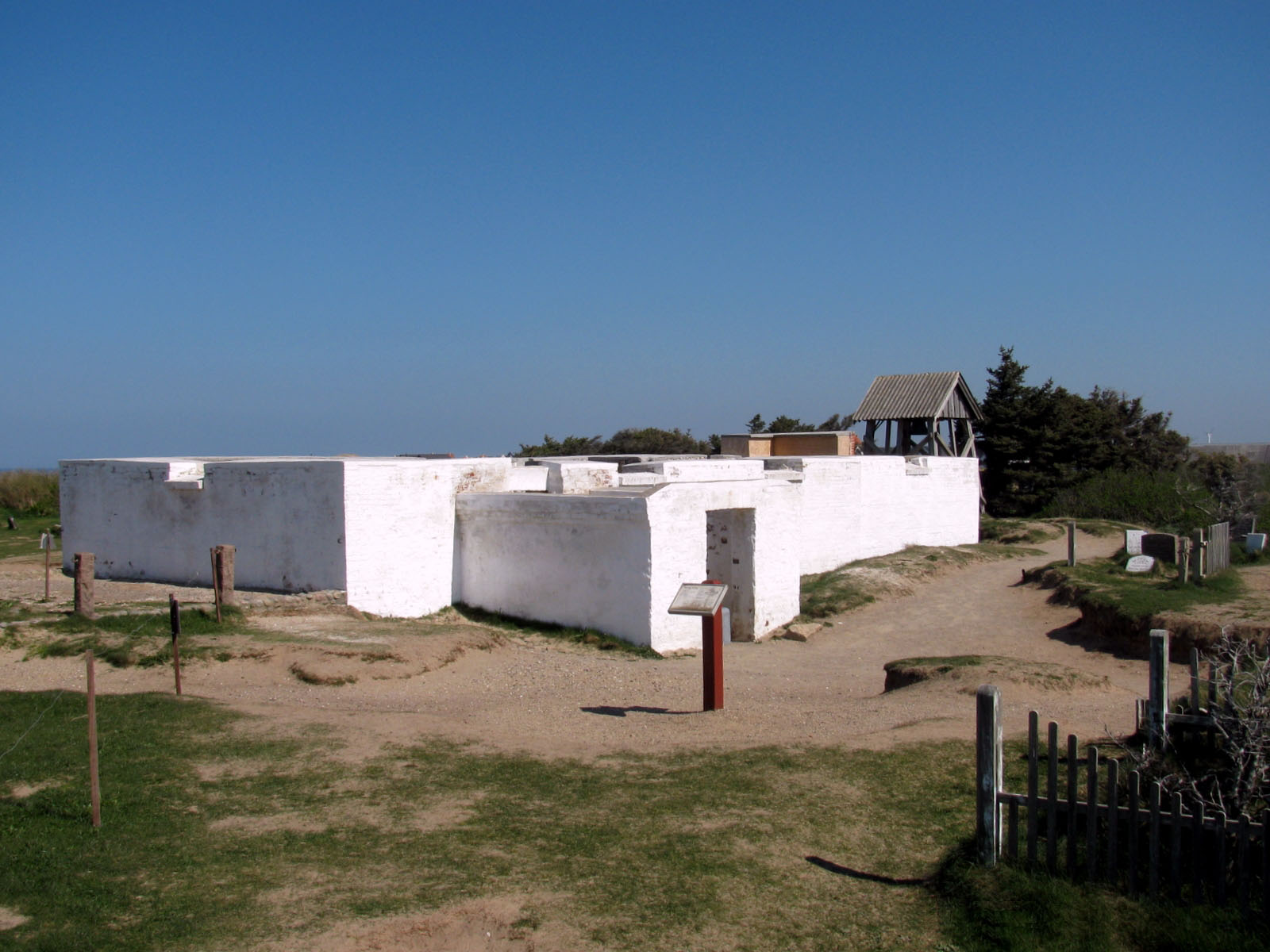
Mårup church, 2009

== See also ==
- The Church of Trzęsacz in Pomerania which largely collapsed in 1901 due to coastal erosion.
