= Districts of Norway =

Historical provinces of Norway

The country of Norway is historically divided into a number of districts. Many districts have deep historical roots, and only partially coincide with today's administrative units of counties and municipalities. The districts are defined by geographical features, often valleys, mountain ranges, fjords, plains, or coastlines, or combinations of the above. Many such regions were petty kingdoms up to the early Viking Age.

== Regional identity ==
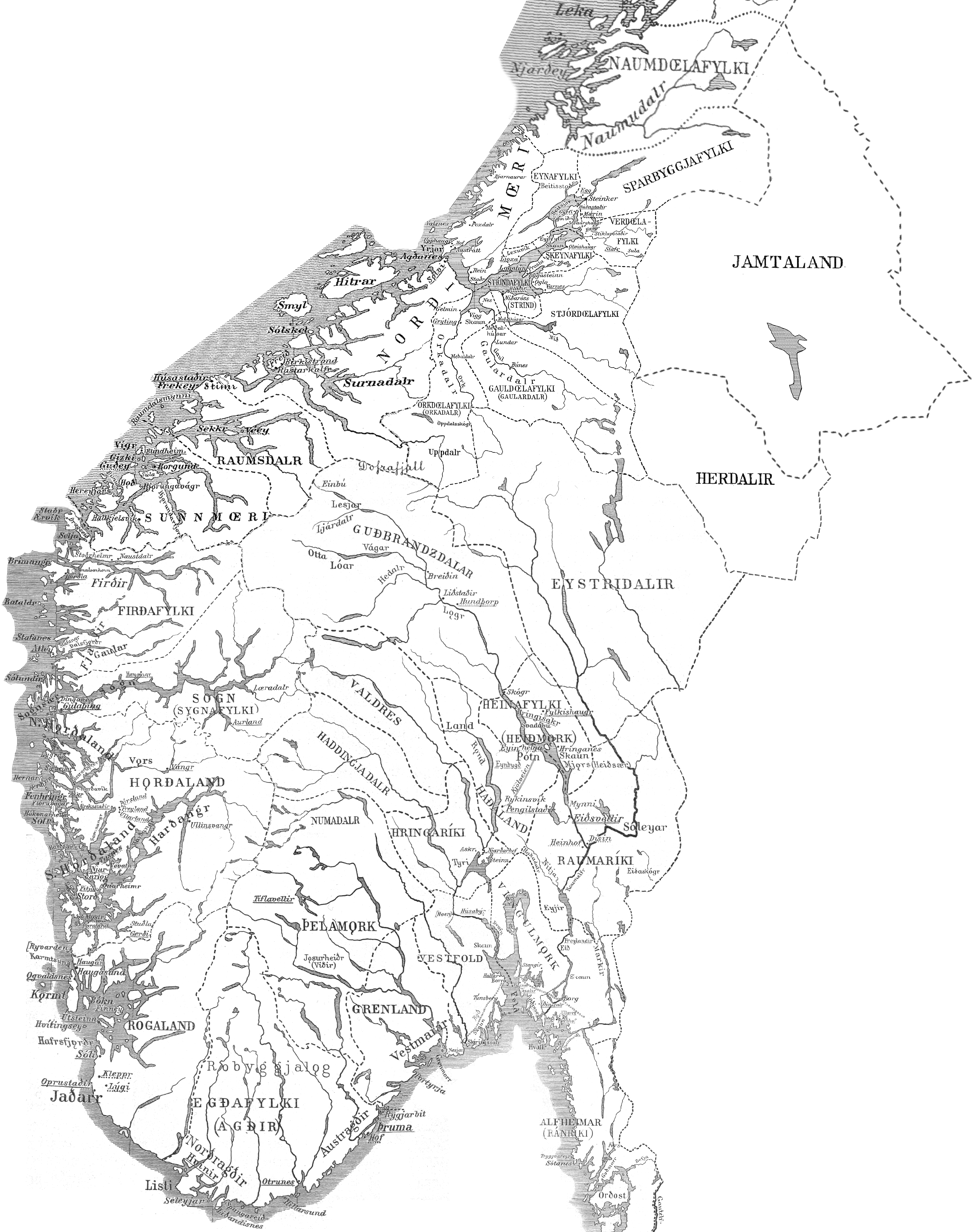
Southern Norway's districts during the Middle Ages

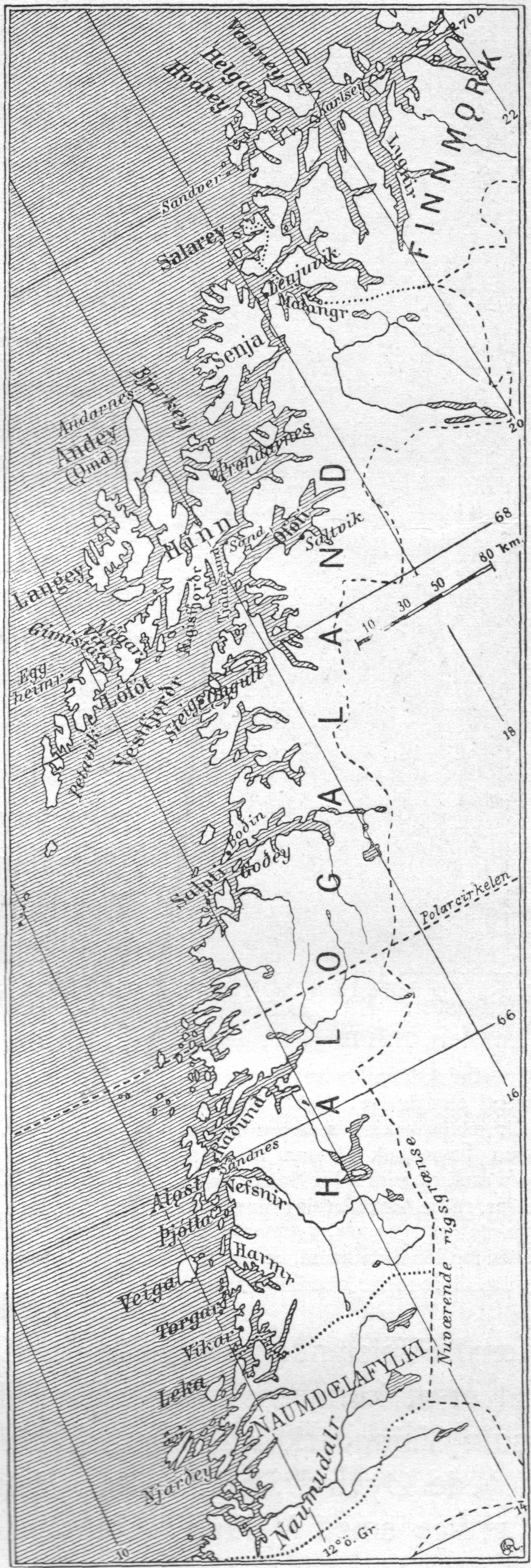
Northern Norway's districts during the Middle Ages

A high percentage of Norwegians identify themselves more by the district they live in or come from, than the formal administrative unit(s) whose jurisdiction they fall under. A significant reason for this is that the districts, through their strong geographical limits, have historically delineated the region(s) within which one could travel without too much trouble or expenditure of time and money (on foot or skis, by horse/ox-drawn cart or sleigh or dog sled, or by one's own small rowing or sail boat). Thus, dialects and regional commonality in folk culture tended to correspond to those same geographical units, despite any division into administrative districts by authorities.

In modern times the whole country has become more closely connected, based on the following:

- Communication technologies such as telegraph, newspapers, telephone, radio and TV, in particular Televerket and NRK.
- The construction of mountain crossings, tunnels through mountains, bridges, undersea tunnels; many of these projects, particularly the larger bridges and the undersea tunnels, were undertaken as late as the 1970s forward.
- Establishing a coastal express route of combined passenger and cargo ships, like the Hurtigruten, sailing regularly from Bergen to Kirkenes and back again, and stopping by at a host of cities and towns along the western and northern coast.
- The construction of railroads between distant parts of the country.
- The opening of dozens of new airports all over the country through the 1960s and 1970s.
- The release of private cars from government rationing and import restrictions from the 1950s onwards.

A concrete display of the Norwegian habit of identifying themselves by district can be seen in the many regional costumes, called bunad, strictly connected to distinct districts across the country. Commonly, even city dwellers proudly mark their rural origins by wearing such a costume, from their ancestral landscape, at weddings, visits with members of the royal family, Constitution Day (May 17), and other ceremonial occasions.

== List of traditional districts ==
The following list is non-exhaustive and partially overlapping.

The first name is the name in Bokmål, the second Nynorsk.

=== Nord-Norge / Nord-Noreg (North Norway) ===
- Helgeland
- Lofoten
- Ofoten
- Salten
- Vesterålen

See also Finnmark, Hålogaland and Tromsø.

=== Sørlandet (Southern Norway) ===
- Agder
- Kristiansandregionen
- Lister
- Setesdal

=== Trøndelag ===
- Fosen
- Gauldalen
- Innherad
- Namdalen
- Orkdalen
- Stjørdalen

=== Vestlandet (Western Norway) ===
- Dalane
- Hardanger
- Haugalandet
- Jæren
- Midhordland
- Nordfjord
- Nordhordland
- Nordmøre
- Romsdal
- Ryfylke
- Sogn
- Sunnfjord
- Sunnhordland
- Sunnmøre
- Voss

=== Østlandet / Austlandet (Eastern Norway) ===
- Follo
- Glåmdalen
- Grenland
- Gudbrandsdalen
- Hadeland
- Hallingdal
- Hedmarken
- Land
- Numedal
- Ringerike
- Romerike
- Toten
- Upper Telemark
- Valdres
- Vestfold
- Østerdalen
- Østfold

See also Viken and Vingulmark.

== See also ==
- Regions of Norway
- Counties of Norway
- Metropolitan regions of Norway
- Subdivisions of Norden
- Traditional districts of Denmark
