= Sýsla =

Police district in Iceland and the Faroe Islands

A sýsla is a police district in Iceland and the Faroe Islands. For the historical entity in Denmark and Norway see: syssel.

== Faroe Islands sýsla ==
- Norðoyar
- Eysturoy
- Streymoy
- Vágar
- Sandoy
- Suðuroy

== Iceland ==
- Árnessýsla
- Austur-Barðastrandarsýsla
- Austur-Húnavatnssýsla
- Austur-Skaftafellssýsla
- Borgarfjarðarsýsla
- Dalasýsla
- Eyjafjarðarsýsla
- Gullbringusýsla
- Kjósarsýsla
- Mýrasýsla
- Norður-Ísafjarðarsýsla
- Norður-Múlasýsla
- Norður-Þingeyjarsýsla
- Rangárvallasýsla
- Skagafjarðarsýsla
- Snæfellsnes-og Hnappadalssýsla
- Strandasýsla
- Suður-Múlasýsla
- Suður-Þingeyjarsýsla
- Vestur-Barðastrandarsýsla
- Vestur-Húnavatnssýsla
- Vestur-Ísafjarðarsýsla
- Vestur-Skaftafellssýsla
