= Rubjerg Knude Lighthouse =

Non-operative lighthouse on the coast of the North Sea in Rubjerg, Hjørring, Denmark

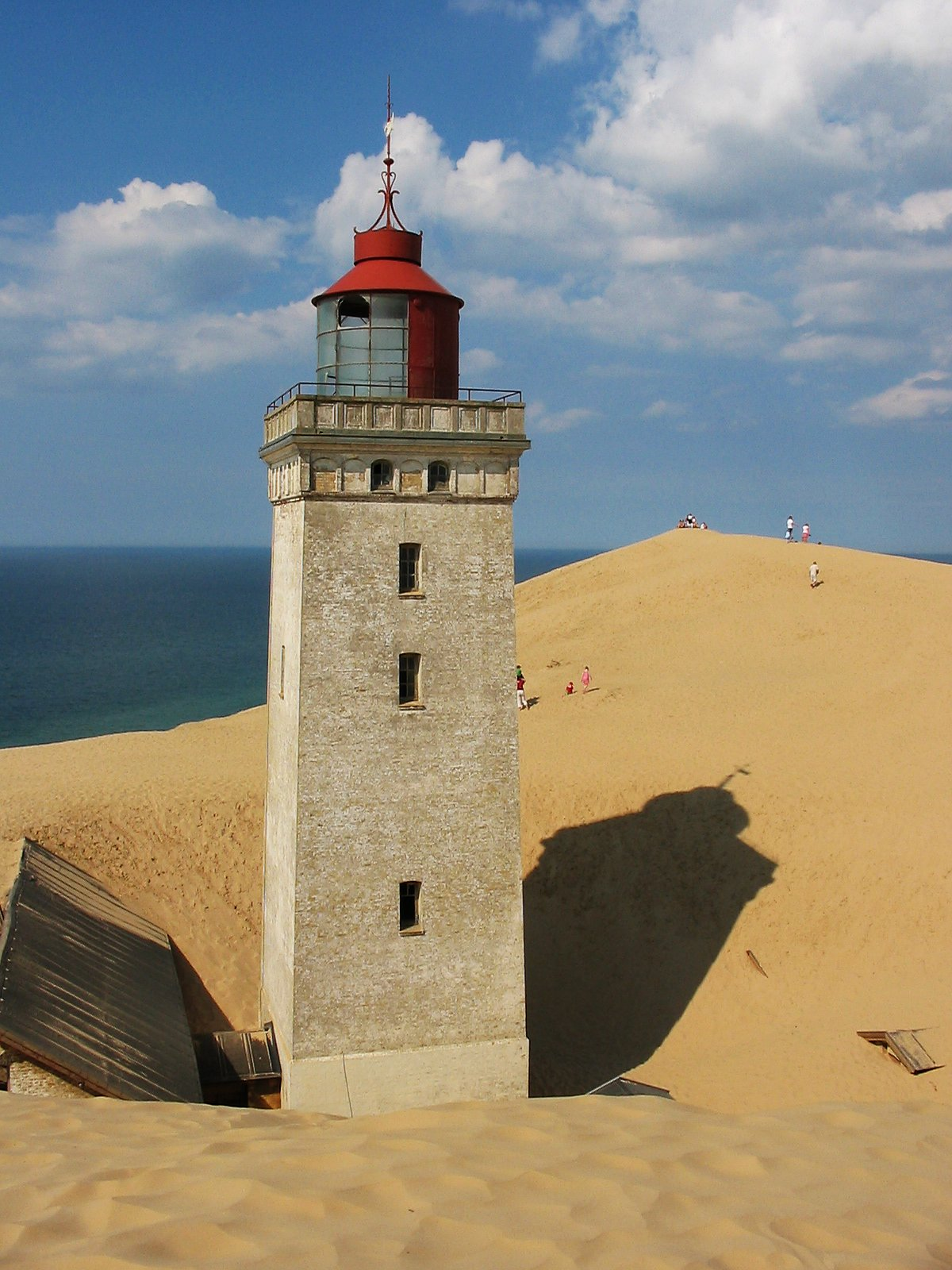
- The lighthouse in 2004
- Location: Rubjerg, Hjørring Municipality, Denmark
- Coordinates: 57°26′56″N 9°46′28″E

Tower
- Constructed: 1900
- Construction: masonry tower
- Height: 23 metres (75 ft)
- Shape: square tower with balcony and lantern
- Markings: white tower, red lantern
- Operator: Vendsyssel Historiske Museum

Light
- Deactivated: 1968
- Focal height: 90 m (300 ft)
- Characteristic: Fl(1+2) W 30s

Rubjerg Knude Lighthouse (Danish: Rubjerg Knude Fyr) is on the coast of the North Sea in Rubjerg, in the Jutland municipality of Hjørring in northern Denmark. It was first lit on 27 December 1900. Construction of the lighthouse began in 1899.

== Description and history ==
The lighthouse is on the top of Lønstrup Klint (cliff), 60 metres (200 ft) above sea level. Until 1908 it operated on gas which it produced from a gasworks on the site.

Shifting sands and coastal erosion are a serious problem in the area. The coast is eroded on average 1.5 metres (4.9 ft) a year, which can be seen most clearly at the nearby Mårup Church. Built around 1250, the church was originally 1 kilometre (0.62 mi) from the coast, but was dismantled in 2008 to prevent its falling into the sea.

The lighthouse ceased operating on 1 August 1968. For a number of years, the buildings were used as a museum and coffee shop, but continually shifting sands caused them to be abandoned in 2002. By 2009, the small buildings were severely damaged by the pressure of the sand and were later removed.

In 2016, the lighthouse was rejuvenated with the installation of a new stair and an internal kaleidoscopic light display.

It was expected that the tower would fall into the sea by 2023; however, works to relocate the lighthouse started on 14 August 2019, and on 22 October 2019 the 23 metres (75 ft) high lighthouse, weighing 720 tonnes, was moved 70 m (230 ft) inland on specially built rails. The cost of the move was 5 million Danish kroner (£0.6 million; €0.7 million; $0.75 million) and was paid by Hjørring Council with government funding. The move is expected to secure the future of the lighthouse at least until around 2060.

== Gallery ==
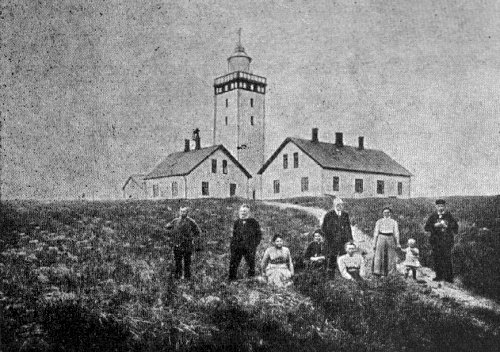
The lighthouse in 1912

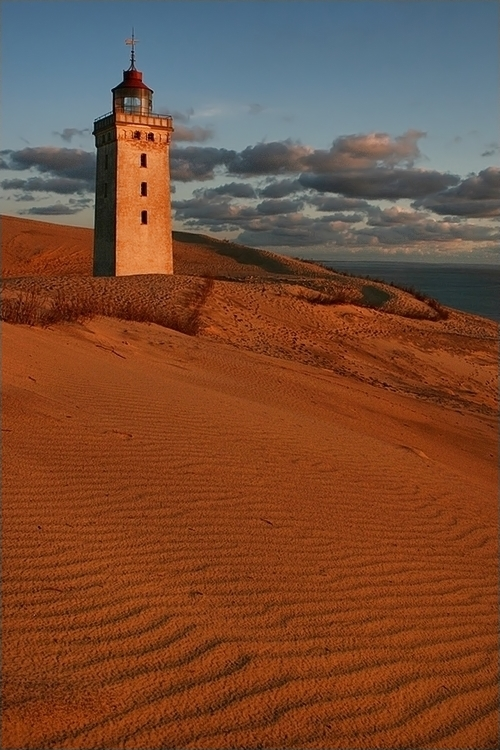
Lighthouse being encroached by the sand dunes

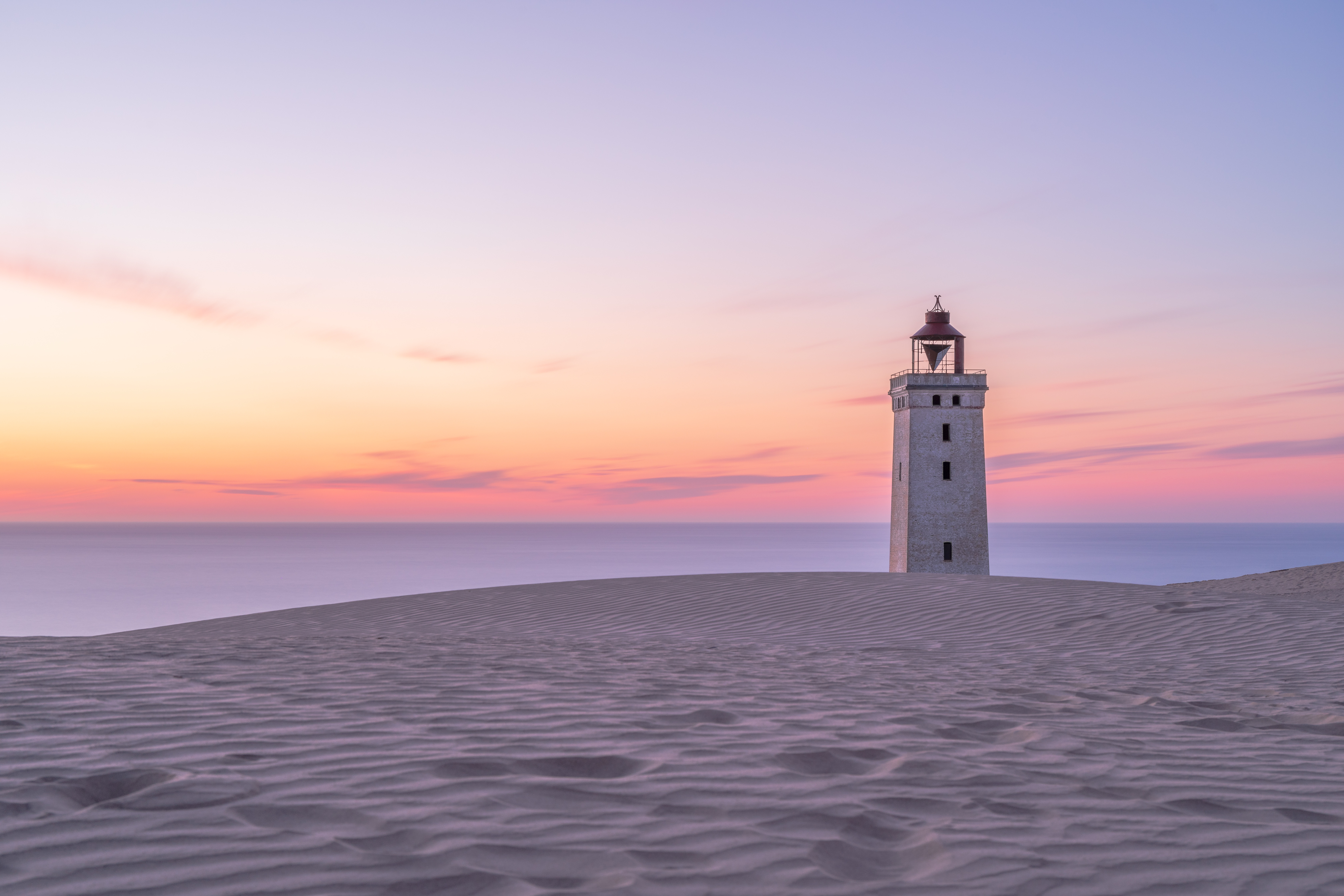
The lighthouse in 2018

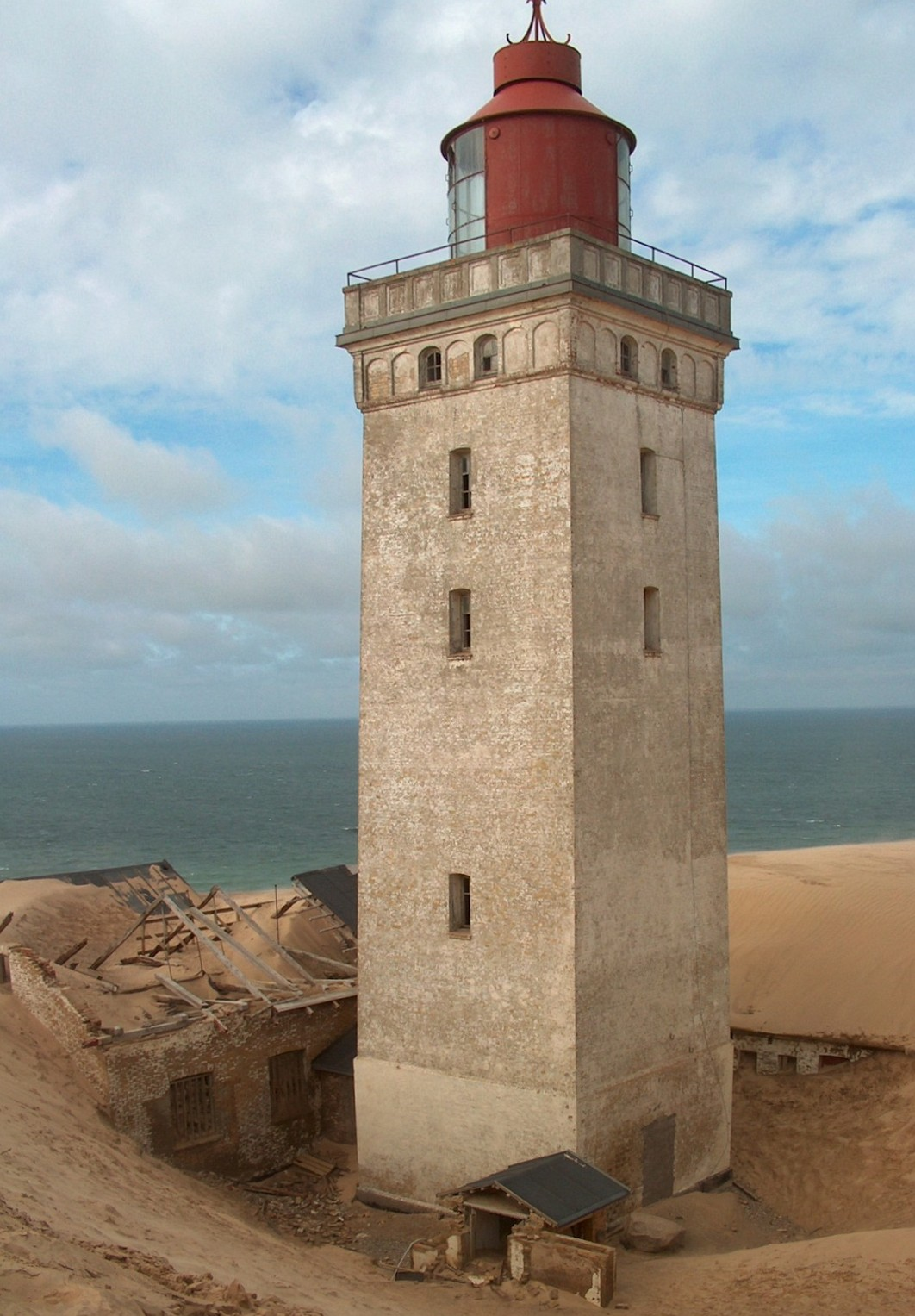

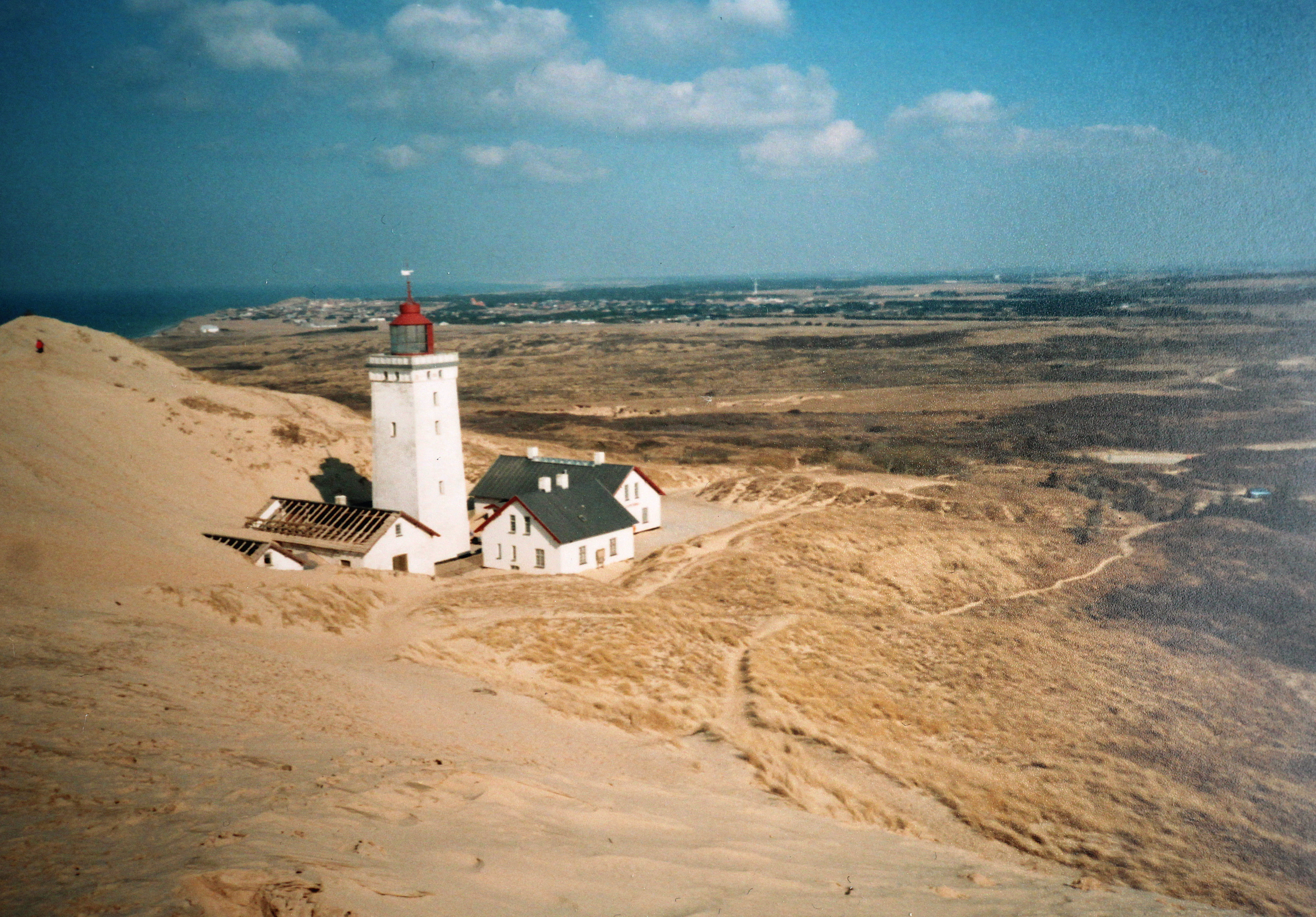

== See also ==
- List of lighthouses and lightvessels in Denmark
