= Hanherred =

Coordinates: 57°06′00″N 9°18′00″E

Outline of Hanherred in North Jutland, Denmark

Hanherred (or Han Herred or Hanherrederne) is a traditional district in northern Jutland, Denmark. It lies between Thy in the west and Vendsyssel in the east. To the north it faces the North Sea (Skagerrak) and to the south the Limfjord. There are only two towns with more than 1,000 inhabitants, Fjerritslev and Brovst.

Hanherred is the central, but lesser known part of the North Jutlandic Island. Since the municipal reform of 2007, it is mainly a part of Jammerbugt municipality. The westernmost fringe with the villages of Frøstrup and Vesløs belongs to Thisted municipality and is sometimes erroneously thought to be part of Thy. The border to Thy is Arup Vejle and Tømmerby Fjord, while the border to Vendsyssel is the river Ryå, just west of Aabybro.

Herred is an ancient Danish judicial district, and since the area actually contains two of these, Øster (East) Han Herred and Vester (West) Han Herred, the plural form Hanherrederne is sometimes used.

Hanherred and Thy share the largest bird sanctuary in Northern Europe, Vejlerne. Nearby is the bird cliff of Bulbjerg. The large Viking ring castle Aggersborg lies at a strategic location at the Limfjord.
