= Syssel =

Country subdivision in Scandinavia

A syssel is a historical type of country subdivision in Denmark and elsewhere in Scandinavia. The mediaeval Danish sysler may be compared to the fylker of Norway, the landskap of Sweden and Finland, the shires of England and Scotland, and the Gaue of the Holy Roman Empire. A syssel was subdivided into a number of hundreds or herreder.

The name still can be found in the Danish district of Vendsyssel, as well as in a governmental title, sýslumenn, in Iceland, the Faroe Islands, and Svalbard.

== Jutland ==
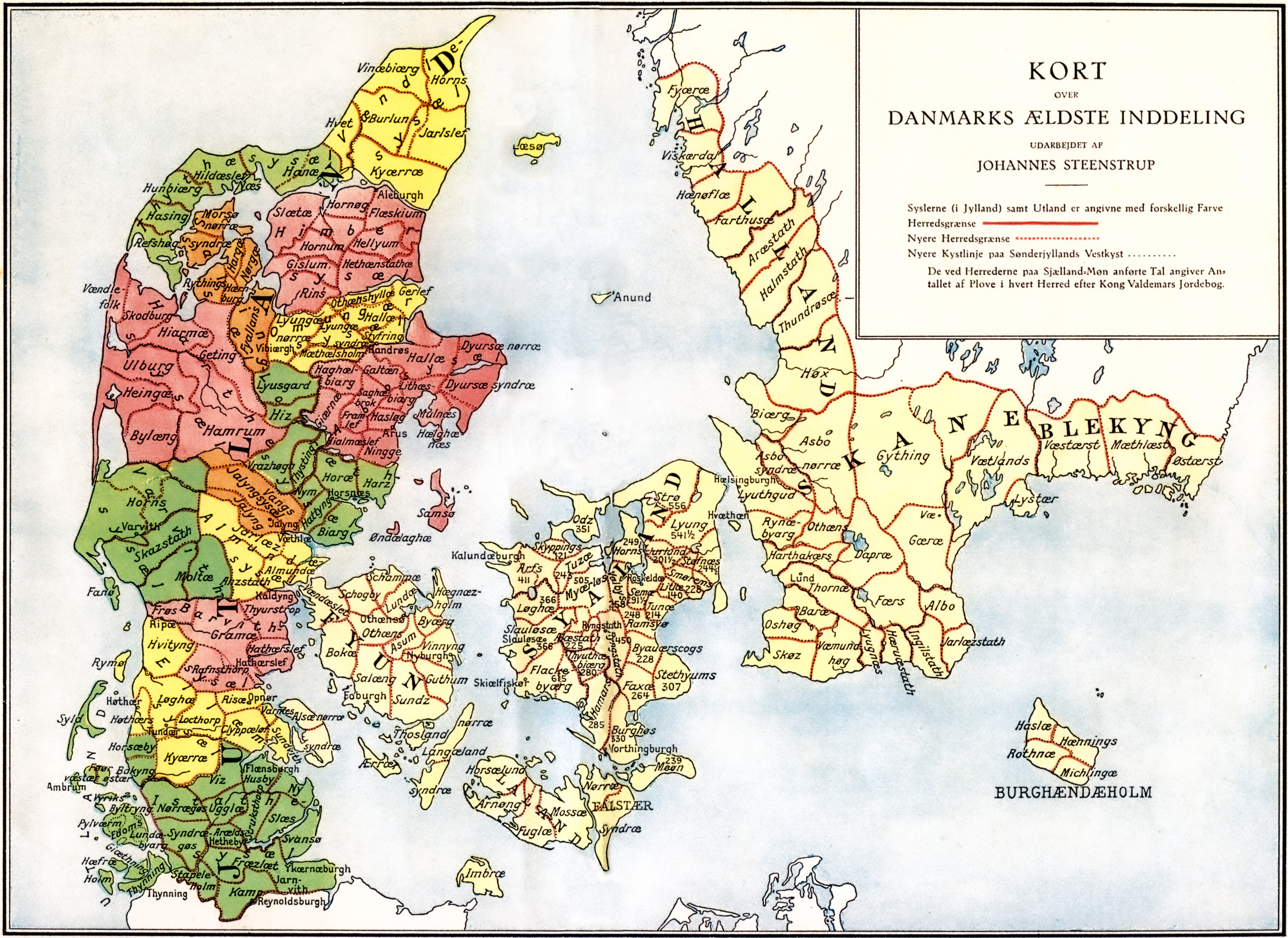
A map showing the divisions of medieval Denmark: herreder (hundreds) and Jutland's sysler.

Sysler and hundreds:

1. Vendsyssel: Horns Herred, Vennebjerg Herred, Børglum Herred, Jerslev Herred, Hvetbo Herred, Kær Herred
2. Thysyssel: Hillerslev Herred, Hundborg Herred, Hassing Herred, Refs Herred
3. Sallingsyssel: Morsø Nørre Herred, Morsø Sønder Herred, Salling Nørre Herred, Harre Herred, Rødding Herred, Hindborg Herred and Fjends Herred)
4. Himmersyssel: Slet Herred, Hornum Herred, Fleskum Herred, Års Herred, Hellum Herred, Gislum Herred, Hindsted Herred and Rinds Herred
5. Ommersyssel: Nørlyng Herred, Sønderlyng Herred, Middelsom Herred, Onsild Herred, Nørhald Herred, Gerlev Herred and Støvring Herred
6. Hardsyssel: Vandfuld Herred, Skodborg Herred, Hjerm Herred, Ginding Herred, Ulfborg Herred, Hammerum Herred, Hind Herred and Bølling Herred)
7. Åbosyssel: Houlbjerg Herred, Galten Herred, Sønderhald Herred, Rougsø Herred, Djurs Nørre Herred, Djurs Sønder Herred, Mols Herred, Øster Lisbjerg Herred, Vester Lisbjerg Herred, Sabro Herred, Gjern Herred, Hjelmslev Herred, Framlev Herred, Hasle Herred, Ning Herred
8. Loversyssel: Lysgård Herred, Hids Herred, Vrads Herred, Tyrsting Herred, Nim Herred, Hatting Herred, Bjerre Herred, Voer Herred, Hads Herred
9. Hansyssel: Hanherred
10. Vardesyssel: Vester Horne Herred, Nørre Horne Herred, Øster Horne Herred, Skast Herred, Gørding Herred, Malt Herred
11. Jellingsyssel: Nørvang Herred and Tørrild Herred
12. Almindsyssel: Jerlev Herred, Andst Herred, Brusk Herred, Holmans Herred and Elbo Herred
13. Barvidsyssel: Tyrstrup Herred, Gram Herred (eastern half), Rangstrup Herreder and Haderslev Herred
14. Ellumsyssel: Hviding Herred, Højer Herred, Lø Herred, Kær Herred, Slogs Herred, Rise Herred, Lundtoft Herred, Sundeved and a small part of eastern Søndre Rangstrup Herred
15. Istedsyssel: Nørre & Sønder Gøs Herreder, Vis Herred, Ugle Herred, Husby Herred, Ny Herred, Strukstrup Herred, Slis Herred and Arns Herred.

== Greenland ==
Before the administrative reform in Greenland of November 18, 1950, there were 12 syssel in West Greenland.

- South Greenland (Sydgrønlands Landsråd)
  - Julianehaab Syssel
  - Frederikshaab Syssel
  - Godthaab Syssel
  - Sukkertoppen Syssel
  - Holsteinsborg Syssel
- North Greenland (Nordgrønlands Landsråd) – not to be confused with later Avannaa
  - Godhavn Syssel
  - Egedesminde Syssel
  - Christianshaab Syssel
  - Jakobshavn Syssel
  - Ritenbenk Syssel
  - Umanak Syssel
  - Upernavik Syssel

== See also ==
- Sýsla
