= Kongens Lyngby =

Town and suburb of Copenhagen, Denmark

- Neighbourhood
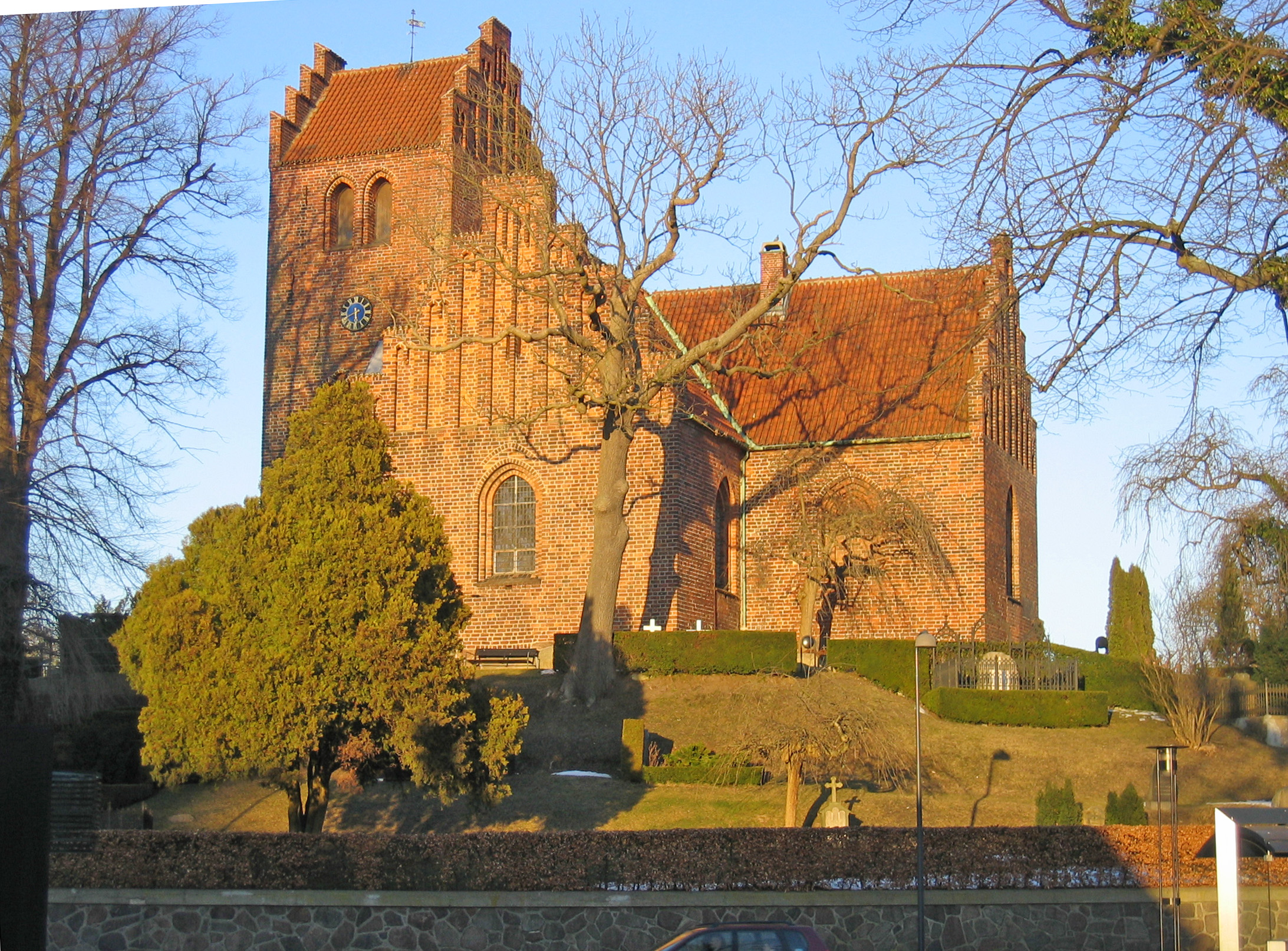
- Lyngby Church

- Location in the Capital Region of Denmark
- Coordinates: 55°46′30.0″N 12°30′07.0″E
- Country: Denmark
- Region: Capital Region
- Municipality: Lyngby-Taarbæk
- Time zone: UTC+1 (CET)
  - Summer (DST): UTC+2 (CEST)
- Postal code: 2800

Kongens Lyngby ([ˈkʰʌŋŋ̍s ˈløŋˌpyˀ], Danish for "the King's Heather Town"; short form Lyngby) is the seat and commercial centre of Lyngby-Taarbæk Municipality in the northern suburbs of Copenhagen, Denmark. Lyngby Hovedgade is a busy shopping street and the site of a branch of Magasin du Nord as well as Lyngby Storcenter. The district is also home to several major companies, including COWI, Bang & Olufsen, ICEpower a/s and Microsoft. The Technical University of Denmark relocated to Lyngby from central Copenhagen in the 1970s. Lyngby station is located on the Hillerød radial of Copenhagen's S-train network.

== History ==
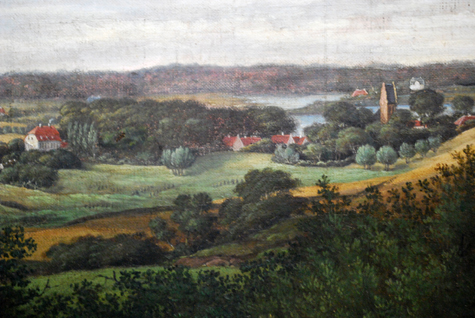
Kongens Lyngby in c. 1820 with the White Mansion visible on the left

The name Kongens Lyngby is first recorded in 1348. At that time large parts of North Zealand belonged to the Catholic Church (represented by Roskilde Cathedral) and the name Lyngby was associated with several places. Store Lyngby belonged to Arresø church. "Our" Lyngby, on the other hand, was crown land. It may therefore have been to distinguish it from these other places that the name emerged.

The original Lyngby village is now known as Bondebyen. Kongens Lyngby was also the site of a watermill, Lyngby Watermill, which is first mentioned in 1492 but is probably several hundred years older.

A royal road, Lyngby Kongevej, was created in 1584 to provide an easy link between Copenhagen and Frederick's new Frederiksborg Castle from where it was later extended to Fredensborg and Helsingør. It was the first of a number of royal roads created by Frederick II and his successor Christian IV.

In the 18th century, a growing number of country houses were built in the area by civil servants and merchants from Copenhagen. Kongens Lyngby had no market rights but developed into a local service centre with an increasing number of craftsmen and merchants.

The North Line came to Lyngby in 1863 and was extended to Helsingør in 1864. This enabled citizens from Copenhagen to settle permanently in the area. Several factories opened in the area, including Christian Hasselbalck's curtain factory in 1892 which later became the town's largest employer.

In the 1930s, Kongens Lyngby developed into a modern suburb. The North Line was converted into an S-train line with more stations and Kongens Lyngby gradually merged with the neighboring settlements.

== Culture ==
The Open Air Museum (Frilandsmuseet) is located in Lyngby and is visited by more than 200,000 people each year. The museum includes more than 100 historic buildings that were moved to the area. The Lyngby Culture House (Lyngby Kulturhus) contains several restaurants and cafes, along with a cinema - the Cinema Palace (Kinopalæeet) which opened in 2001. Near to Lyngby station, Templet (The Temple) is a venue which regularly hosts concerts.

== Notable residents ==
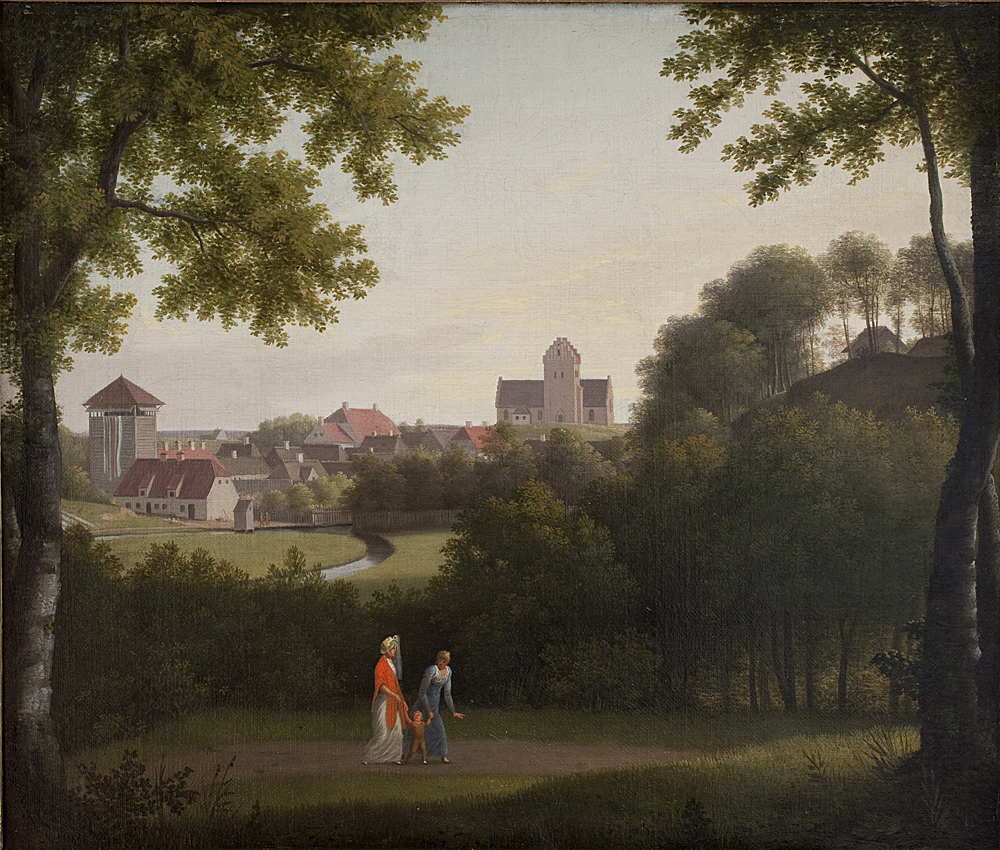
Scene from Kongens Lyngby, 1810, painting by Christoffer Wilhelm Eckersberg

=== Public persons ===
- Vilhelm Theodor Walther (1819–1892), architect and building inspector
- Ingrid Jespersen (1867–1938), pedagogue and school principal
- Finn Thiesen (born 1941), linguist, iranist, and translator
- Carsten Koch (born 1945), former MF and minister
- Lise-Lotte Rebel (born 1951), bishop and first woman bishop in the Church of Denmark
- Mads Tofte (born 1959), computer scientist
- Daniel Toft Jakobsen (born 1978), MF

=== Arts ===
- Elisa Marie Thornam (1857–1901), landscape painter and botanical illustrator
- Olga Wagner (1873–1963), painter and sculptor
- Dagmar Freuchen-Gale (1907–1991), illustrator, author and editor
- Kasper Heiberg (1928–1984), painter and sculptor
- Nina Pens Rode (1929–1992), actress
- Hans Abrahamsen (born 1952), composer
- Lars von Trier (born 1956), film director and screenwriter
- Søs Fenger (born 1961), musician

=== Sports ===
- Sofus Rose (1894–1974), long-distance runner
- Margot Bærentzen (1907–1983), fencer
- Erling Stuer Lauridsen (1916–2012), wrestler
- Johan Runge (1924–2005), weightlifter
- Helge Hansen (1925–2008), cyclist
- Ib Larsen (born 1945), rower
- Henrik Larsen (born 1966), footballer and football manager
- Frederik Nielsen (born 1983), tennis player
- Nabil Aslam (born 1984), footballer
- Jeanette Ottesen (born 1987), swimmer
- Mai Grage (born 1992), tennis player
- Jacob Bruun Larsen (born 1998), footballer
- Christian Rasmussen (born 2003), footballer
