= Finn Thiesen =

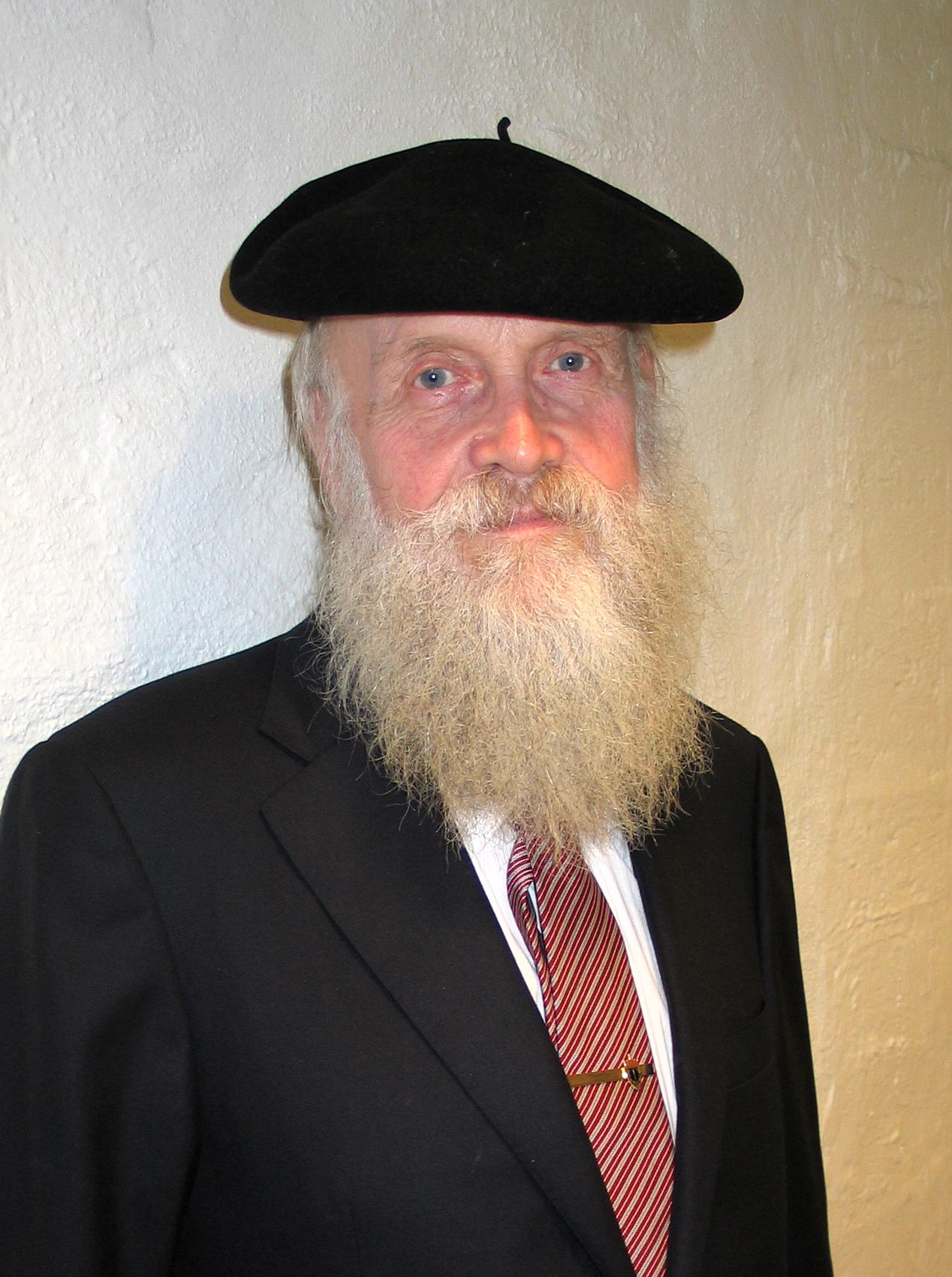
Finn Thiesen in September 2011

Finn Vilhelm Thiesen (born August 4, 1941, in Kongens Lyngby near Copenhagen) is a Danish-Norwegian linguist, iranist and translator. He was an associate professor of Persian at the University of Oslo (Department of Cultural Studies and Oriental Languages) until 2008.

Thiesen was residing in Tehran, Iran, in the years 1977 to 1979 when he studied Persian literature at the University of Tehran. Thiesen speaks a dozen foreign languages fluently, including Persian, Hindi, Urdu, Turkish, Kurdish, English, German, and French, and is also a specialist in Ancient Greek, Middle Persian and Sanskrit. He is one of today's foremost experts in the Persian and poet Hafiz, and can recite the whole of his Diwan (poetry collection) by heart. Thiesen has written an introduction to the Norwegian edition I vinens speil, published in the series "Verdens hellige skrifter" (literally: World Holy Scriptures), 2010.

== Selected publications ==
- Eleven Etymologies, Languages of Iran: Past and Present, Wiesbaden, 2006.
- On the Meaning of the Terms zahed and zohd in Divan-e Hafez, Haptacahaptaitis Festschrift for Fridrik Thordarson on the occasion of his 77th birthday, Oslo, 2005.
- Un texte intraduisible, le cas Hafez, Forum–Presses De La Sorbonne Nouvelle & Korean Society of Conference Interpretation, 2004, 2: 2.
- Fra vinhus og moské, Rumi, Hafez og andre persiske diktere, gjendiktet fra persisk av F. Thiesen og E. Kittelsen, Oslo, 2003.
- Pseudo-Hafez: A reading of Wilberforce-Clarke's rendering of Divan-e Hafez, Orientalia Suecana, 2003, LI-LII.
- A Manual of Classical Persian Prosody (with chapters on Urdu, Karakhanidic, and Ottoman prosody), Belgium, Wiesbaden, 1982.

== See also ==
- Iranian studies
- Persian language
- Hafez
