= Þórðarson =

Þórðarson is a surname of Icelandic origin, meaning son of Þórður. In Icelandic names, the name is not strictly a surname, but a patronymic. The name is sometimes written Thordarson and may refer to:

- Björn Þórðarson (1879–1963), Icelandic politician; Prime Minister of Iceland 1942–44
- Chester Thordarson (born Hjörtur Þórðarson) (1867–1945), inventor who held nearly a hundred patents
- Fridrik Thordarson (1928–2005), Icelandic linguist
- Guðjón Þórðarson (born 1955), Icelandic professional football manager
- Guðlaugur Þór Þórðarson (born 1967), Icelandic politician; member of the Althing since 2003
- Óláfr Þórðarson (1210–1259), Icelandic scholar and skald
- Ólafur Þórðarson (footballer) (born 1965), Icelandic professional football player
- Sigurdur Thordarson (born 1992), FBI informant against Julian Assange
- Sigurjón Þórðarson (born 1964), Icelandic politician
- Sigvatr Þórðarson (fl. 11th century), court poet to kings of Norway
- Stefán Þórðarson (born 1975), Icelandic professional football player
- Stefán Teitur Þórðarson (born 1998), Icelandic professional football player
- Sturla Þórðarson (1214–1284), Icelandic chieftain and writer of sagas
- Teitur Thordarson (born 1952), Icelandic football coach
- Þórbergur Þórðarson (1889–1974), Icelandic author and Esperantist
