= Beocenter 9500 =

Music system by Bang & Olufsen

The BeoCenter 9500 is an integrated home music system by Bang & Olufsen. It consists of an AM/FM receiver, CD player and cassette recorder. Its features a mirrored exterior of polished aluminium and smoked glass. The BeoCenter 9500 has no buttons: it is controlled by touching the glass with a fingertip.

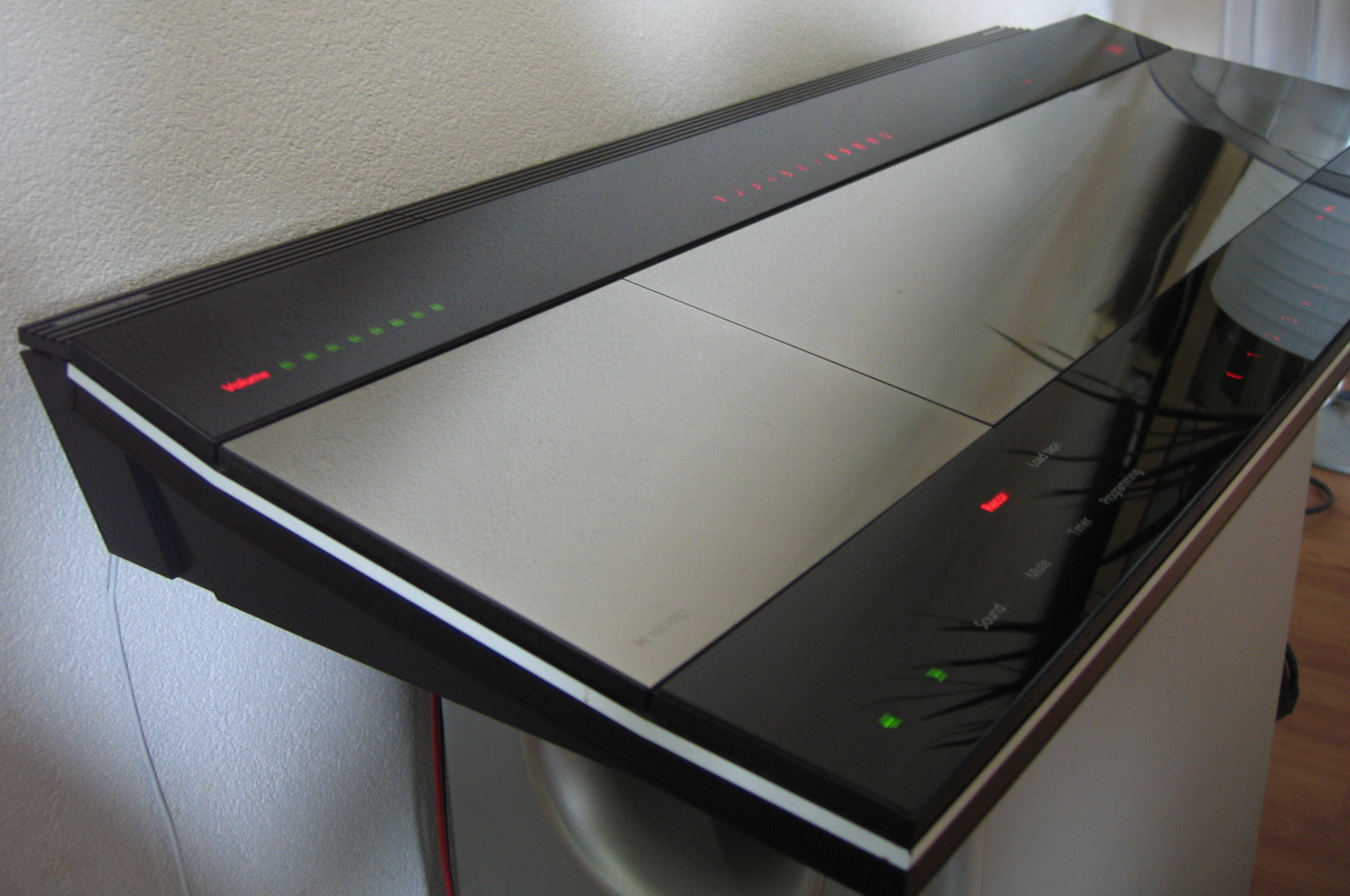
BeoCenter9500

== History ==
The BeoCenter 9500 was introduced in 1989 as the successor to the BeoCenter 9000 and sold until 1994 when it was replaced by its successor the BeoCenter 9300.

== Controls ==
The BeoCenter 9500 featured B&O's unique sensi-touch control which works through a condenser effect. A graphite area is printed on the underside of the glass panel, and charged with a high frequency current. The proximity of a finger will invoke the control. The controls are illuminated by LEDs. Only the controls which have a function to the current activity are lit up. The CD and cassette are hidden behind polished aluminium lids. A light touch on the display panel makes the lids glide to the side giving immediate access to disc or cassette.

== Award ==
Its designer David Lewis was awarded the iF product design award in 1990 for the BeoCenter 9500 although the original design (the BeoCenter 9000) was by his predecessor Jacob Jensen.

== See also ==
- Bang & Olufsen
