= Serene (phone) =

Mobile phone by Samsung and Bang & Olufsen

- Serene, open, on stand
- Manufacturers: Samsung Electronics and Bang & Olufsen
- Availability by region: 2005
- Successor: Serenata
- Compatible networks: GSM 900/1800/1900 MHz, GPRS
- Form factor: Clamshell
- Dimensions: 64.7×69.7×23.9 mm (2.55×2.74×0.94 in)
- Weight: 115 g
- Memory: 31 MB
- Battery: Lithium Ion 800 mAh
- Rear camera: 0.3 megapixel
- Display: 320 X 240 px TFT LCD, 256K colors
- Connectivity: Bluetooth
- Data inputs: circular keypad

Serene is a mobile phone produced as a joint venture between Samsung Electronics and Bang & Olufsen. It was released in the last quarter of 2005 in Europe. It was available in select stores throughout the world and cost $1275 (~€1000).

A successor to the Serene called the Serenata was announced and released in October 2007. It features a slide out speaker and has a heavy focus on the music functions of the handset. Serenata retailed for $2000.

== The joint venture ==
Bang & Olufsen and Samsung formed the joint venture with the aim of competing in the high end mobile phone market, primarily competing with several handsets from Nokia. The partnership has drawn on the design strengths of Bang & Olufsen and Samsung's mobile phone technology enabling Bang & Olufsen to re-enter the mobile phone market after an absence of several years and Samsung to expand into premium mobile phones.

It is not the first time that Bang & Olufsen has worked with other companies to produce mobile phones. Notably the BeoCom 9800 was produced with Philips and the BeoCom 9500 was produced in partnership with Ericsson.

== Handset Aims ==
Serene, closed, on stand.

Like most Bang & Olufsen products, the phone is industrially simplistic. The concept of the phone was brought down to pure communication and, although the phone can facilitate voice calls, text messages, multimedia messages and take pictures, its camera is only 0.3 megapixels and common, often expected, features of many common phones, such as games are not present.

== Handset Design ==
The phone consists of two halves on an aluminium hinge. The hinges have an internal power assist motor to help open the phone completely. One half features a circular keypad with an iPod-style scroll wheel, and the other features a liquid crystal display. The handset was designed so that for standard use the screen is at the bottom of the phone, and the keypad is on the half that flips out. This was for two reasons: It stops the phone from getting greasy when you talk, and it also improves the weight balance while holding the phone. The handset also inverts so you can hold the phone up the other way if you so wished.

There are some major ergonomic flaws in the Serene. The camera is located on the side of the phone on one of the hinges which makes taking photos hard. In addition, you must use a special screwdriver to access the battery compartment.

== Technical specifications ==
Form factor	Clamshell / Transformer
GSM frequencies	900/1800/1900 MHz
GPRS	Yes
Screen	TFT, 256K colours, 320x240 pixels
Camera	0.3 Megapixels
Multimedia Messaging	Yes
Built-in memory	31 MB
Java	No
Memory card slot	No
Bluetooth	Yes
Infrared	No
Data cable support	Yes
Browser	1.2.1
Email	Yes
Music player	No
Radio	No
Video Player	No
Polyphonic tones	Yes, 64 chords
Mp3 ringtones	Unknown
Battery	Li-Ion 800 mAh
Talk time	Up to 3 h 30 min
Standby time	Up to 225 h
Weight	115 g
Dimensions	64.7x69.7x23.9 millimeters
Availability	Q4/2005
