= Serenata (phone) =

2007 Bang & Olufsen-Samsung mobile phone

The Samsung SGH-F310 Serenata was the successor to the Serene mobile telephone. The device, a collaboration between Samsung and Bang & Olufsen, featured the logotypes of both companies. Designed by David Lewis, it was introduced in October 2007. The device had a unique iPod-style scroll wheel, Bang & Olufsen's advanced audio system, 4GB of internal storage, and HSDPA support for high-speed data.

The phone was a GSM-class mobile that operated in the 900, 1800, 1900, and 2100 MHz cellular radio bands. It featured no keypad; instead it used Bang and Olufsen's clickwheel and a touchscreen. Known for its distinctive music player, which featured a loudspeaker accessible through a slider.

The Serenata was ranked as a runner up in Wallpaper's 2008 Design Awards, losing to the original iPhone. TechCrunch deemed the Serenata to be an improvement over the Serene, but Australia's GadgetGuy found it "unusable as a day-to-day mobile when it comes to simple tasks like text messaging" while praising its "impressive sound quality." However, CNET found that while sound quality was good, it was "definitely form over function."
