= Svend Olufsen =

Danish electrical engineer (1897-1949)

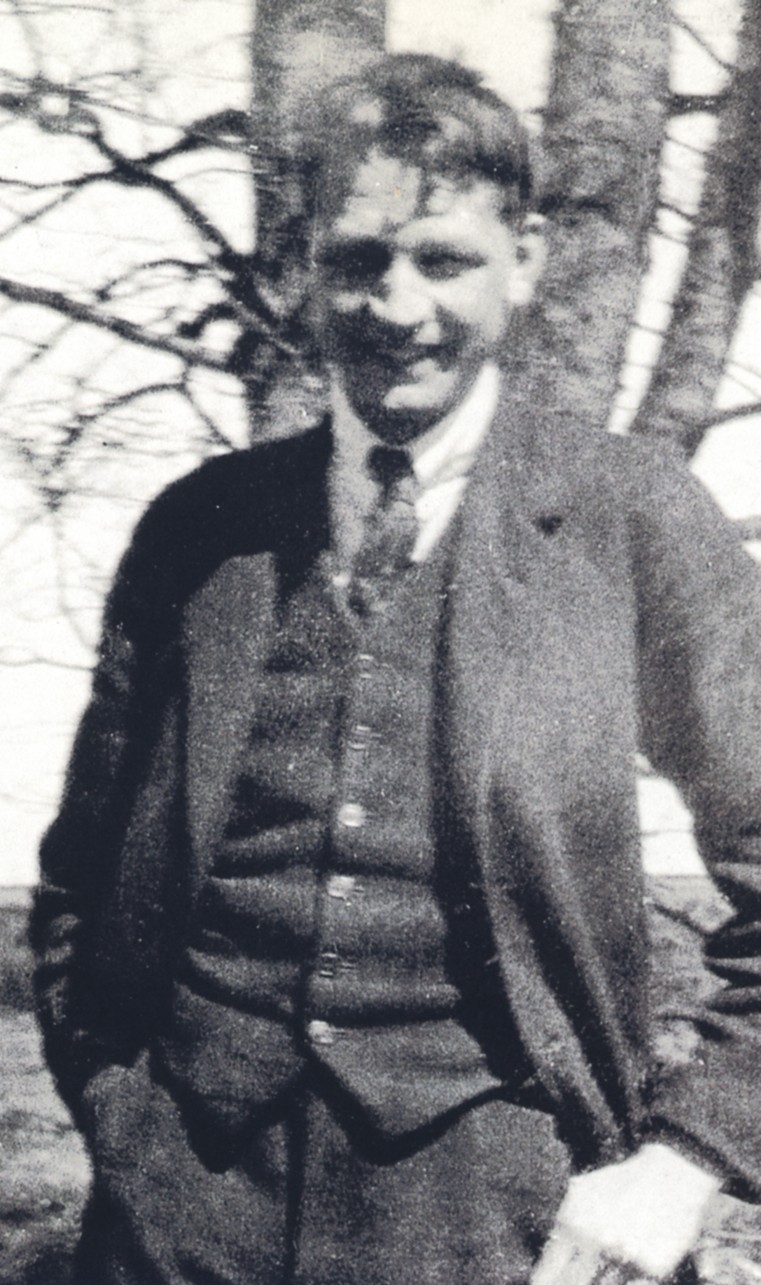
- Olufsen, circa 1930
- Born: Svend Andreas Grøn Olufsen; 12 December 1897; Quistrup at Struer, Denmark
- Died: 22 December 1949 (aged 52); Skive, Denmark
- Occupation: Electrical engineer
- Known for: Bang & Olufsen

Svend Olufsen (1897–1949), was a Danish electrical engineer who co-founded Bang & Olufsen with Peter Bang. Like Bang, Olufsen studied at the Technical University of Aarhus. Olufsen and Bang both shared an enthusiasm for radio, which at the time was in its infancy.

After Bang returned from a trip to the United States, he and Olufsen began running experiments in Olufsen's family manor, Quistrop, in Struer, Denmark. Their company, Bang & Olufsen, was formally established on 17 November 1925, with Olufsen primarily focusing on the business aspects. Olufsen's mother, Anna, helped fund the company through the sale of their family's eggs. Their first commercially viable product came in 1927 with the production of a radio that could connect to alternating current, rather than be battery-powered.

== See also ==
- Bang & Olufsen
