= ICEpower =

Danish company specializing in audio amplification apps

ICEpower a/s
- Industry: class-d audio electronics
- Genre: R&D Company
- Founded: 1999
- Founder: Karsten Nielsen and Bang & Olufsen a/s
- Headquarters: Søborg, Denmark
- Key people: Keld Lindegaard Andersen, CEO
- Products: B2B audio amplification solutions
- Number of employees: 40+ (Q4 2018)
- Website: www.icepoweraudio.com

ICEpower a/s is a Danish development, production and sales company specialising in Class-D amplifiers for audio applications.

== History ==
In 1994 Karsten Nielsen began to write a Ph.D. dissertation "Audio Power Amplifiers Techniques Based on Efficient Power Conversion" at the Technical University of Denmark as part of a project in collaboration with Bang & Olufsen; his findings were applied in the Beolab 1 active loudspeakers in 1997, and he was awarded a Ph.D. in 1998. Bang & Olufsen subsequently hired Nielsen.

In 1999 a new R&D company; a joint venture between Nielsen and Bang & Olufsen was formed, with the aim of designing integrated amplifiers components of powers up to 1000W as a discrete electronic device. The company was initially called Bang & Olufsen PowerHouse.

In 2001 the company was renamed Bang & Olufsen ICEpower and the company's first commercial product was released – the A series. In 2002 the company began collaboration with Sanyo Semiconductor; a major manufacturer of integrated amplifier chips. In 2003 the ICEpower ASP product range was launched, and the company began a partnership with Samsung Telecommunications for the development of a dedicated amplifier for mobile phones.

Between 2003 and 2008 the companies' product range was extended to include audio amplifier components for mobile phones, home audio (active speakers and amplifiers), car audio and home theatre (multichannel audio).

In 2008 Bang & Olufsen bought out Nielsen's share in the company, making it a wholly owned subsidiary of Bang & Olufsen. At the same time, Nielsen left the company.

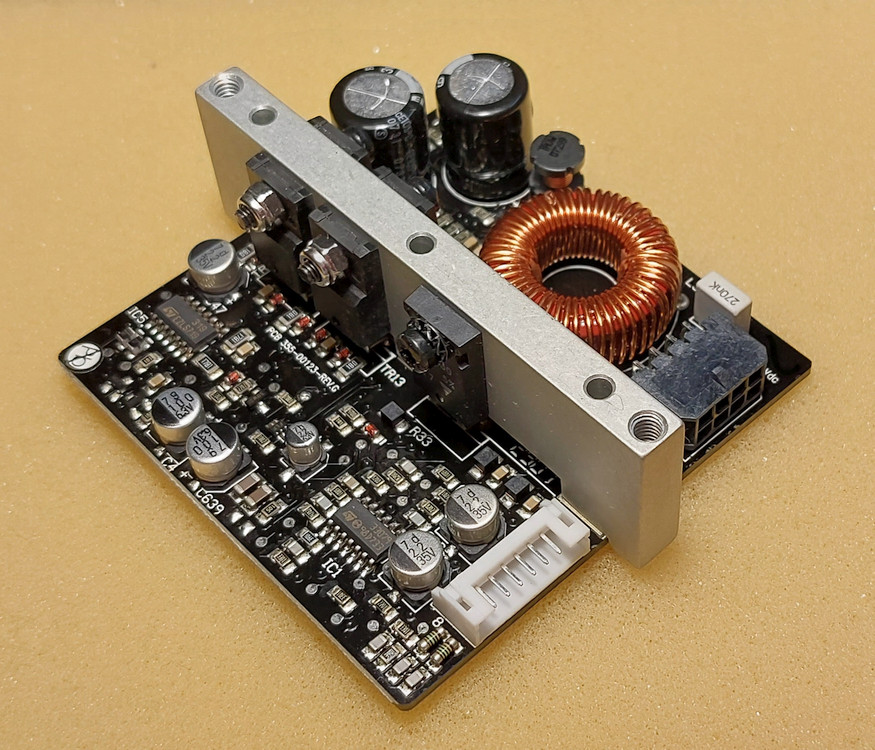
Bang & Olufsen ICE Power Class D Amplifier Module

In 2016, realizing the potential of the business as an independent entity, a management buyout supported by Industry Development (Industri Udvikling) – a Danish private equity company – allowed ICEpower to finally begin the development of its full potential.

Industry Development is funded by Danish taxpayer's savings and the purpose is to turn SMEs (small and medium enterprises) into larger enterprises. The strategic direction and decisions are made by the management of ICEpower, and the management are also majority shareholders.

One of the first strategic moves of ICEpower in 2016 was to acquire Audio Bricks (Sweden) and its holding company, thereby also getting access to fundamentals from Anaview – a former competitor founded by Patrik Boström. The two founders of Audio Bricks, Patrik Boström and Lars Press Petersen, were well known to ICEpower.

In 2017 ICEpower moved to a new location in Søborg.

=== Current operations ===
ICEpower a/s is a 100+ employee firm, involved in applications of class-D amplifiers. The company's engineering development is carried out in its Danish headquarters in Søborg.

== Customers and products ==
Initially the company's products were only found in niche markets i.e. high-end-audio components. During the first decade of the 2000s the company entered the mass market of consumer electronics – with ~40% of Samsung mobile phones using its intellectual property and over 100 million channels of amplification shipped. Current customers seem to include Alpine, AMX, Aston Martin, Asus, Audi, Bowers & Wilkins, Fender Musical Instruments Corporation, Eclipse by Fujitsu Ten, Elipson, Gallien-Krueger, Aguilar, Genz-Benz, Jeff Rowland, Legacy Audio, MartinLogan, Pioneer, Peachtree Audio, PS Audio, Rotel, Teac, Wyred 4 Sound, Seymour AV, XTZ, Vazari Audio, Samsung as well as Bang & Olufsen.

The company produces a standard product range, as well as undertaking custom design work and licensing its intellectual property to mass-market manufacturers.
