= Marilyn Anne =

Ship built in 1919

History
- Name: Frem (1919–40); Vestvåg (1940–58); Vest (1958–68); Marilyn Anne (since 1968)
- Owner: Erik B Kromann (1919–39); Janne Neilsen (1939–58); Commune of Struer (since 1978)
- Port of registry: Marstal, Denmark (1919–39); Skårhamn, Sweden (1939–58); Aalborg, Denmark (1958–68); Struer, Denmark (since 1978)
- Builder: Erik B. Kromann
- Launched: 1919
- Identification: MMSI number: 219012175; Code Letters NWFH (1919-34); Code Letters OUTB (1934–39); Code Letters SEFW (1939–40); Code Letters SFBI (1940–58); Code Letters OWLP (1958– )

General characteristics
- Tonnage: 136 GRT, 119 NRT (1919-32); 141 GRT, 107 NRT (1932- )
- Length: 28.22 m (92 ft 7 in)
- Beam: 7.49 m (24 ft 7 in)
- Draught: 2.59 m (8 ft 6 in)
- Depth: 2.87 m (9 ft 5 in)
- Propulsion: Sails, also auxiliary engine since 1932.
- Sail plan: Three-masted schooner

Marilyn Anne is a three-masted auxiliary schooner that was built in 1919 as Frem by her Danish owner. She was sold to Sweden in 1938 and later renamed Vestvåg. In 1958, she was sold to Denmark and renamed Vest. Following her sale to an American owner in 1968, she was renamed Marilyn Anne. In 1977, she became a training ship for disadvantaged Danish children.

== Description ==
As built, the ship was 28.22 metres (92 ft 7 in) long, with a beam of 7.49 metres (24 ft 7 in), a depth of 2.87 metres (9 ft 5 in), and a draught of 2.59 m (8 ft 6 in). She was assessed at 136 GRT, 119 NRT.

== History ==
Frem was built by Erik B. Kromann at Marstal, Denmark and was initially operated by him. Her port of registry was Marstal and the Code Letters NWPH were allocated. In 1932, she was fitted with an auxiliary oil engine. She was reassessed as 141 GRT, 107 NRT. This was a 2-cylinder Single Cycle Single Action diesel engine, rated at 54nhp. It was made by A/S Tuxham, Copenhagen. In 1934, her Code Letters were changed to OUTB.

In 1939, Frem was sold to Janne Nielsen of Skårhamn, Sweden. Her port of registry was changed to Skårhamn. The Code Letters SEFW were allocated. In 1940, she was renamed Vestvåg and her Code Letters were changed to SFBI.

In 1958, Vestvåg was sold to a Danish owner. Her name was changed to Vest. Her port of registry was Aalborg and the Code Letters OWLP were allocated. In 1968, Vest was sold to an American owner who changed her name to Marilyn Anne and set about restoring her. In 1977, he abandoned the project and she was sold to the Struer Municipality in 1978. Following completion of the restoration work, ownership of Marilyn Anne was transferred to a holding company owned by the Herning, Holstebro and Struer Municipalities. On 17 June 1996, Denmark issued a postage stamp depicting Marilyn Anne. The ship now serves as a school ship for disadvantaged children.
