= BeoCom =

Product line of telephones

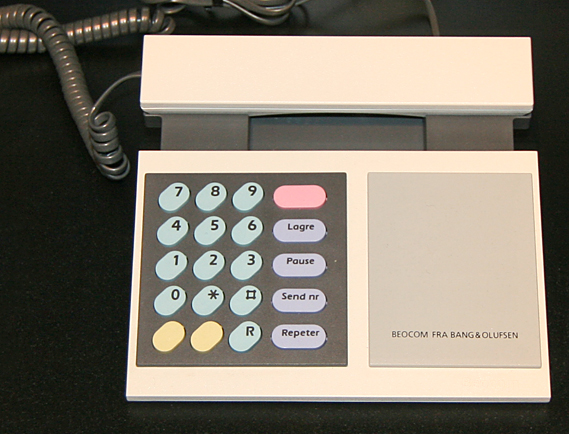
Beocom 1000 from Bang & Olufsen displayed at Norwegian Museum of Science and Technology in Oslo.

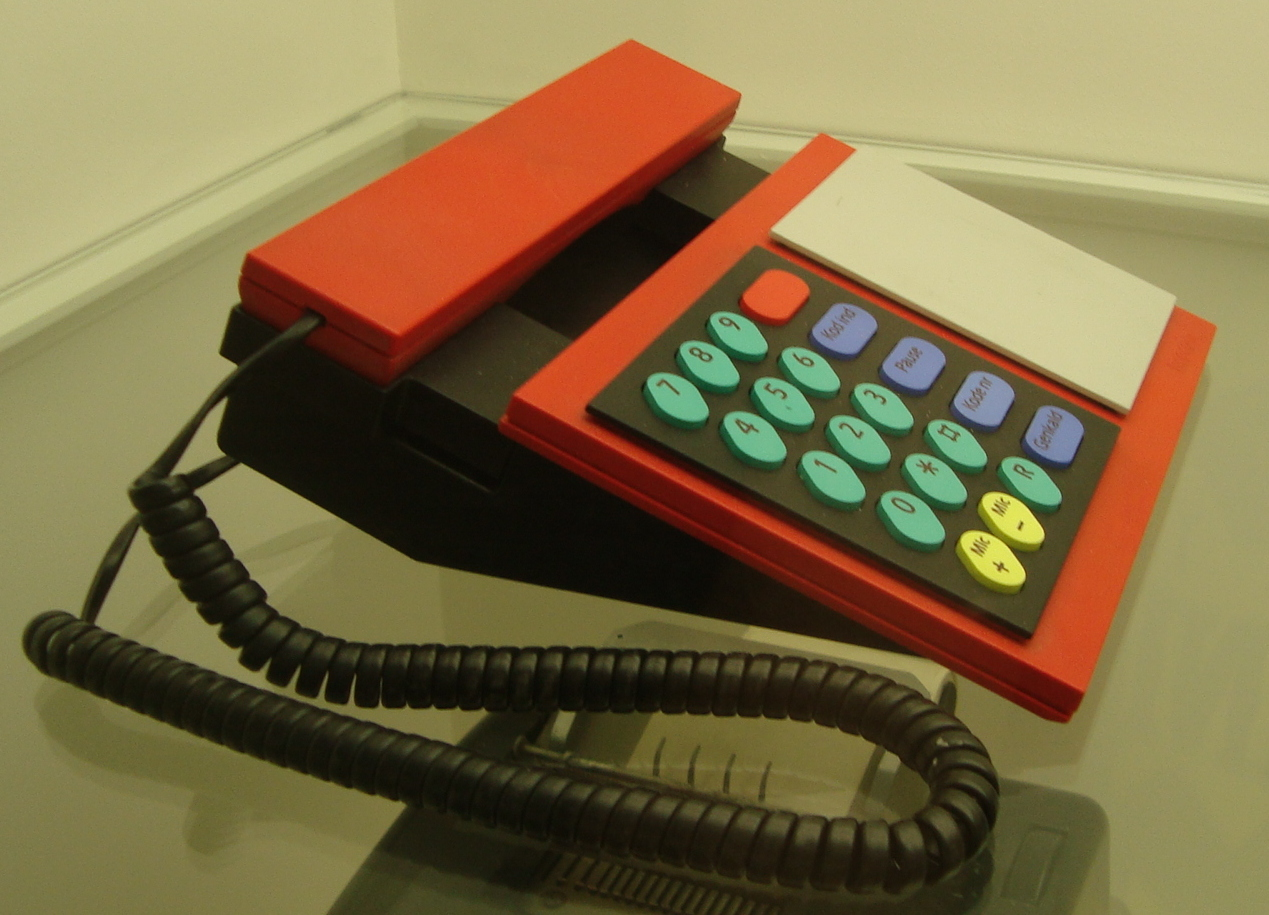
Beocom 1000, 1989-2000.

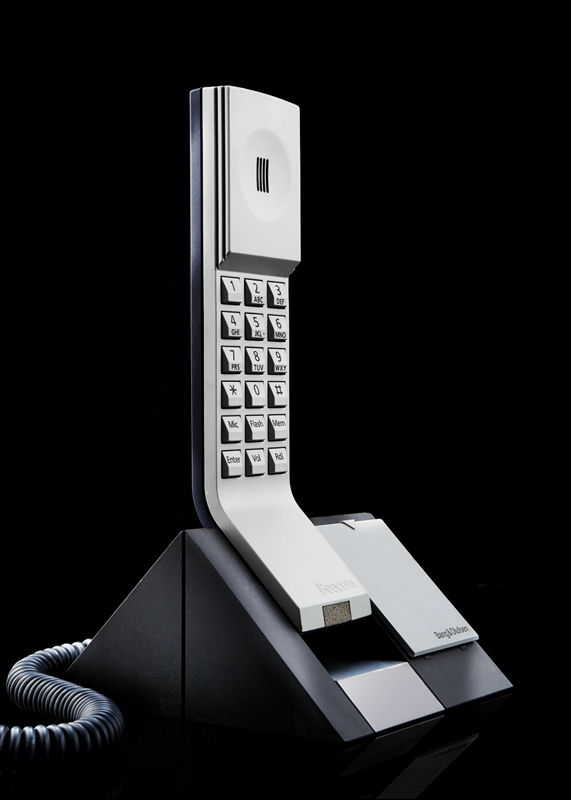
Beocom 1401 by Austin Calhoon

BeoCom is a line of telephones manufactured by Bang & Olufsen. Between the BeoCom 1 (also known in some markets as BeoCom 6000) and the BeoCom 2 phones there is much interoperability. The current versions of these telephones use independent wireless base stations known by the name BeoLine. The Mark 1 version of the BeoLine PSTN base can support up to six BeoCom handsets. the Mark 2 version of the Beoline PSTN base can support eight BeoCom handsets.

== BeoCom 1000 ==
BeoCom 1000 (as shown in image) was designed by Gideon Loewy (Lindinger-Loewy Industrial Design ApS., Copenhagen Denmark, now Scandinavian Design Consultant Company Ltd., Taiwan) in 1983, launched on the market in 1985 and withdrawn in 2003.

== BeoCom 2000 ==
The BeoCom 2000 used an integrated Toshiba TMP47C452AN microcontroller and could store up to 20 phone numbers.

== BeoCom 2200 ==
The BeoCom 2200, also named BeoCom Copenhagen was designed in 1986 by Lindinger-Loewy.

== BeoCom 1 ==
The BeoCom 1 is a model of cordless telephone designed by Henrik Sørig Thomsen. The handset is 159 mm (6¼ inches) in length, 51 mm (2 inches) wide, and weighs 170 g (6 oz). It transmits its signals at 2.4 gigahertz.

The BeoCom 1 is the phone that is used to connect Howie Mandel to the Banker on the US version of Deal or No Deal.

An identical-looking model known as the BeoCom 6000 is sold in non-US markets, and it uses the DECT standards. The round wheel on the phone formed the inspiration for Apple in the design of the first iPods.

== BeoCom 2 ==
The BeoCom 2 is a model of cordless telephone from 2002 designed by David Lewis. The handset is 321mm (≈1 foot) in length with base, and weighs 220 g (≈7.7 oz). It transmits its signals at 2.4 gigahertz in North America, and using DECT frequencies elsewhere. Production of the North American model was discontinued in 2012.

== BeoLine PSTN and BeoLine ISDN ==
The BeoLine is the wireless telephone base station for the BeoCom handsets, designed to connect multiple handsets to an external telephone line. The BeoLine provides a simple PBX, which can route calls to different handsets, and can permit internal calls between handsets. Handsets and base station can share a common Phonebook of up to 200 names-and-numbers. The Mark 1 version of BeoLine was made in two variants: one to connect to a traditional analogue PSTN service, and one to connect to an ISDN service. The Mark 1 BeoLine can support up to six BeoCom handsets of different types (provided that the BeoLine software has been brought sufficiently up-to-date). The Mark 2 BeoLine can support eight BeoCom handsets, but only those of recent manufacture.
