= Peter Bang (engineer) =

Danish engineer (1900–1957)

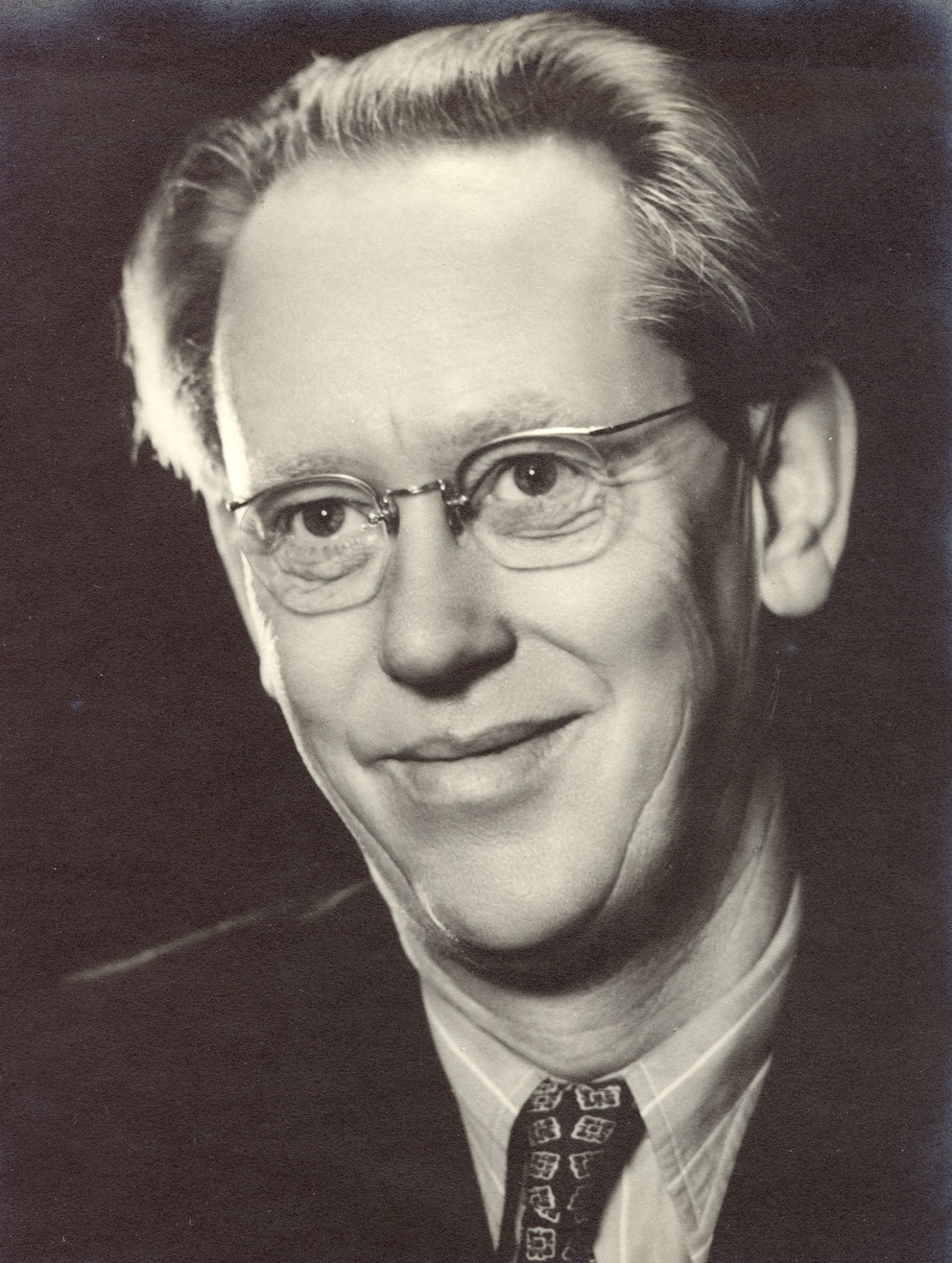
- Peter Bang
- Born: Peter Boas Bang; 14 March 1900; Frederiksberg, Denmark
- Died: 26 May 1957 (aged 57); Struer, Denmark
- Occupations: Engineer & entrepreneur
- Known for: Bang & Olufsen

Peter Boas Bang was a Danish engineer and entrepreneur. In 1925, he founded the company Bang & Olufsen with Svend Olufsen.

== Childhood ==
Peter Boas Bang was the son of Camillo Cavour Bang (1861–1949) and Augusta Pouline Boas (1868–1919). His brother Poul Bang was a film director and director for Saga Studios.

Bang grew up in a wealthy family in Copenhagen with a well-equipped house for the time that had electric lights, phone service and a phonograph; the family also owned a car. At the age of nine he went to Nærum Kostskole. Because of his mother's frailty, he focused on mechanical interests. He spent his pocket money on batteries, doorbells, and switches.

Bang was interested in technology and radios from an early age, and he remembered having heard a recording of Enrico Caruso at the age of five.

At 14, he left the boarding school and entered middle school. He continued his experiments and was assisted by his cousin Isse Wulff, who was an assistant at the Technical Institute.

In 1917, he finished school, where his practical abilities were pointed out. His father then got him a job as a blacksmith apprentice at the Siemens & Halske forge where he did experiments at night, including making a windmill to supply the family's summer house with electricity.

== Studies at Aarhus Elektroteknikum ==
Bang studied for four years and after a short break his father agreed to let him study electrical engineering at Aarhus Electrotechnikum. He built several radio sets for his family in Copenhagen and his mother's family. During his studies he also experimented with radio technology and kept asking his father for money for batteries; thus, in his third year of studying, he built a receiver that did not rely on batteries.

== Stay in the US ==
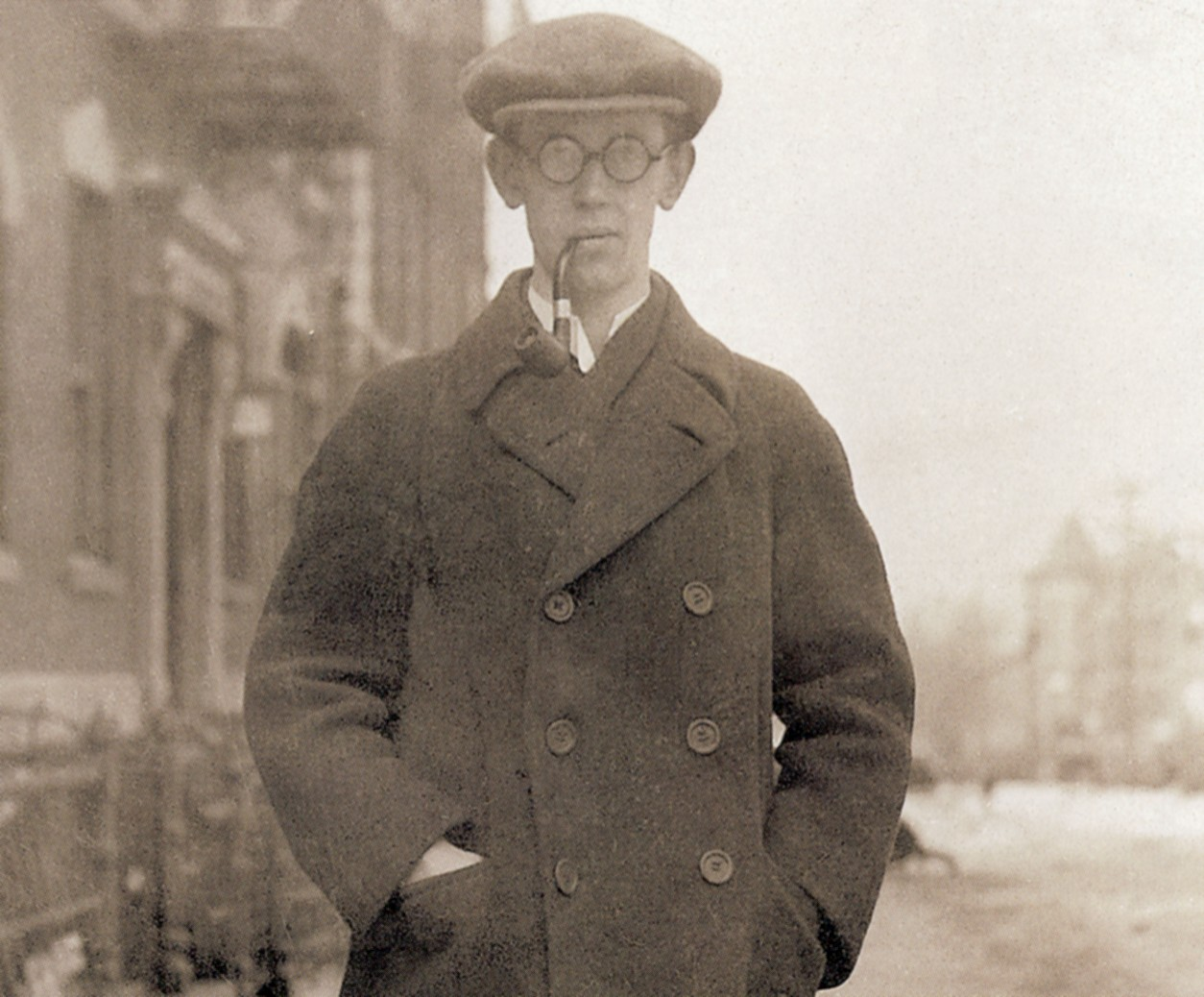
Peter Bang 1924

When the broadcasting industry rapidly developed, especially in the United States, Bang travelled there to further his education. He and his brother Poul travelled there in autumn of 1924, where Peter studied the production of radios and worked for six months in a radio factory. Before leaving he talked to his father about the idea of starting a factory in Denmark. He could not start immediately, but after his return to Copenhagen he was contacted by fellow student Svend Andreas Grøn Olufsen, who had built a small receiver in Quistrup. He needed a partner. Bang travelled to visit Olufsen, and with money Olufsen's mother earned by selling eggs, the engineers got started. It was to be the beginning of a multi-year collaboration.

== Foundation of Bang & Olufsen ==
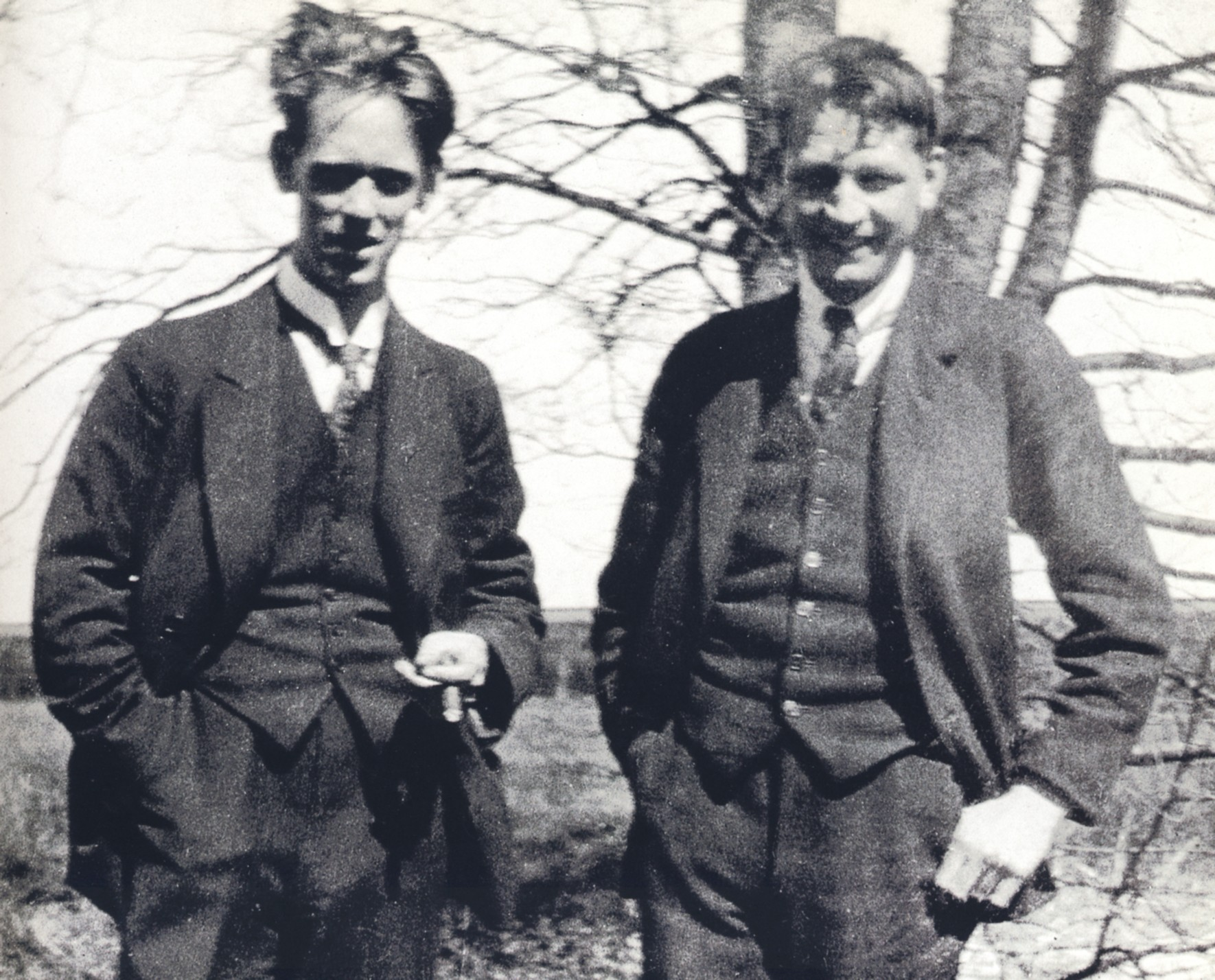
Peter Bang and Svend Olufsen 1930

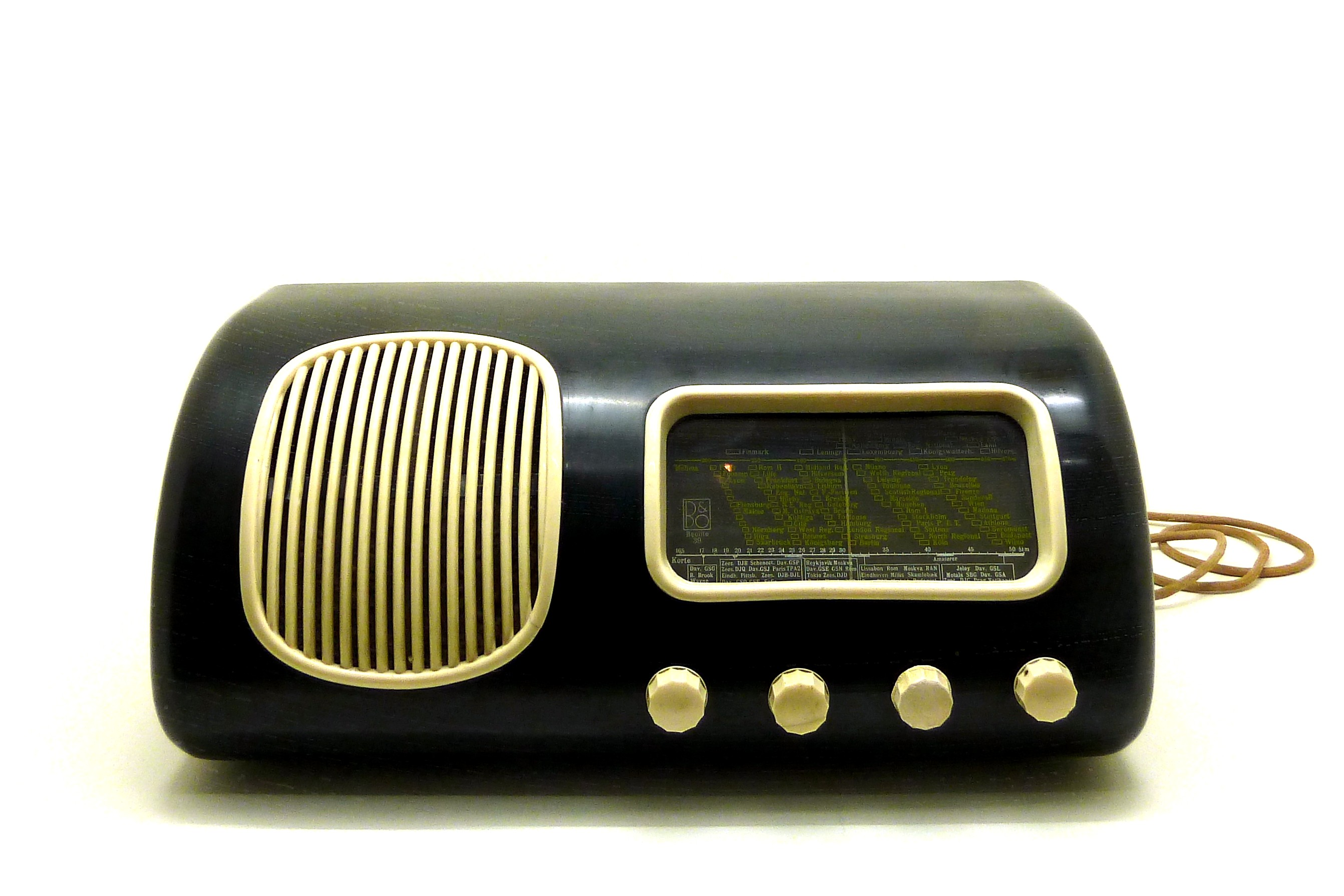
"Beolit 39", constructed by Peter Bang (1939)

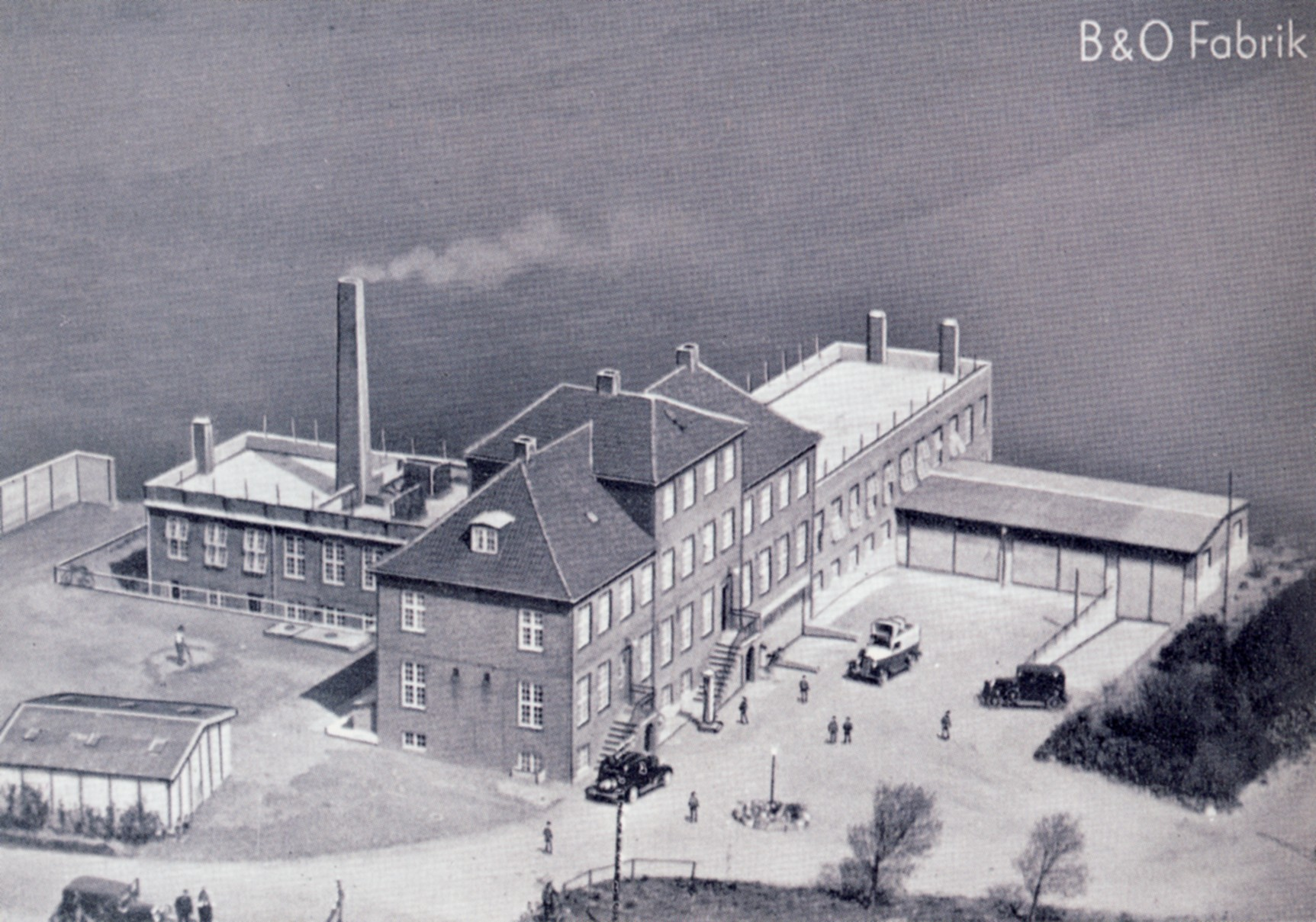
Factory in Struer 1938

It did not take long before both young engineers realised they worked together well and that they had something to collaborate on. Camillo Cavour Bang understood it was a serious project and asked them to come to Copenhagen to complete the formalities. On 17 November 1925 the A/S Bang & Olufsen founding meeting took place. The initial capital was 10,000 Danish kroner. Each founder had a share of 4,000 kr; their fathers each had 1,000 kr. Camillo Cavour Bang was elected president of the board.

After a slow start and modest success with a mains-powered receiver, they found out that there was a more profitable market for a product that supplied battery-powered receivers with power from the mains. This product, which most closely corresponds to today's power adapter, was called the Eliminator. It was released in 1926 as their first commercial product and was the livelihood of the company for the first few years. Bang & Olufsen again became a radio manufacturer with Bang as technical innovator. Bang was a man who tackled and solved problems – often brilliantly – without ever realising how brilliant it was. He often got up at night to perform experiments.

After Svend Olufsen died in 1949, Peter Bang ran the company alone until his death in 1957, before which he was able to see the release of a new defining Bang & Olufsen product, the television, in 1952. Their first television was the model TV 508 S, known as Trillebøren.

== Private life ==
Peter Bang married Else Windfeldt Jensen (1907–1937) in 1933, and in 1935 his son Jens Bang was born. In 1939, he married Kirsten Retlev-Abrahamsen (1914–1990), with whom he had three children: Lotte Bang Thorsen, Lars Peter Bang and Dorte Krogh.

Both sons followed in their father's footsteps: they became engineers and worked in the factory in Struer.

Peter Bang is buried in Gimsing Kirke near Struer.

== Literature ==
- Bang, Jens: "Fra vision til legende", Vidsyn, 2000, ISBN 8798786504 (Dansk).
- Ravn, Thomas Block: "Den nye store radiogud – B&O, Struer og den vide verden", 1992, ISBN 8798339125 (Dansk).
