= Elisa Marie Thornam =

Danish painter

Elisa Marie Thornam (12 March 1857 – 22 April 1901) was a Danish landscape painter and botanical illustrator who contributed to the Flora Danica and Botanisk Tidsskrift.

== Life and career ==
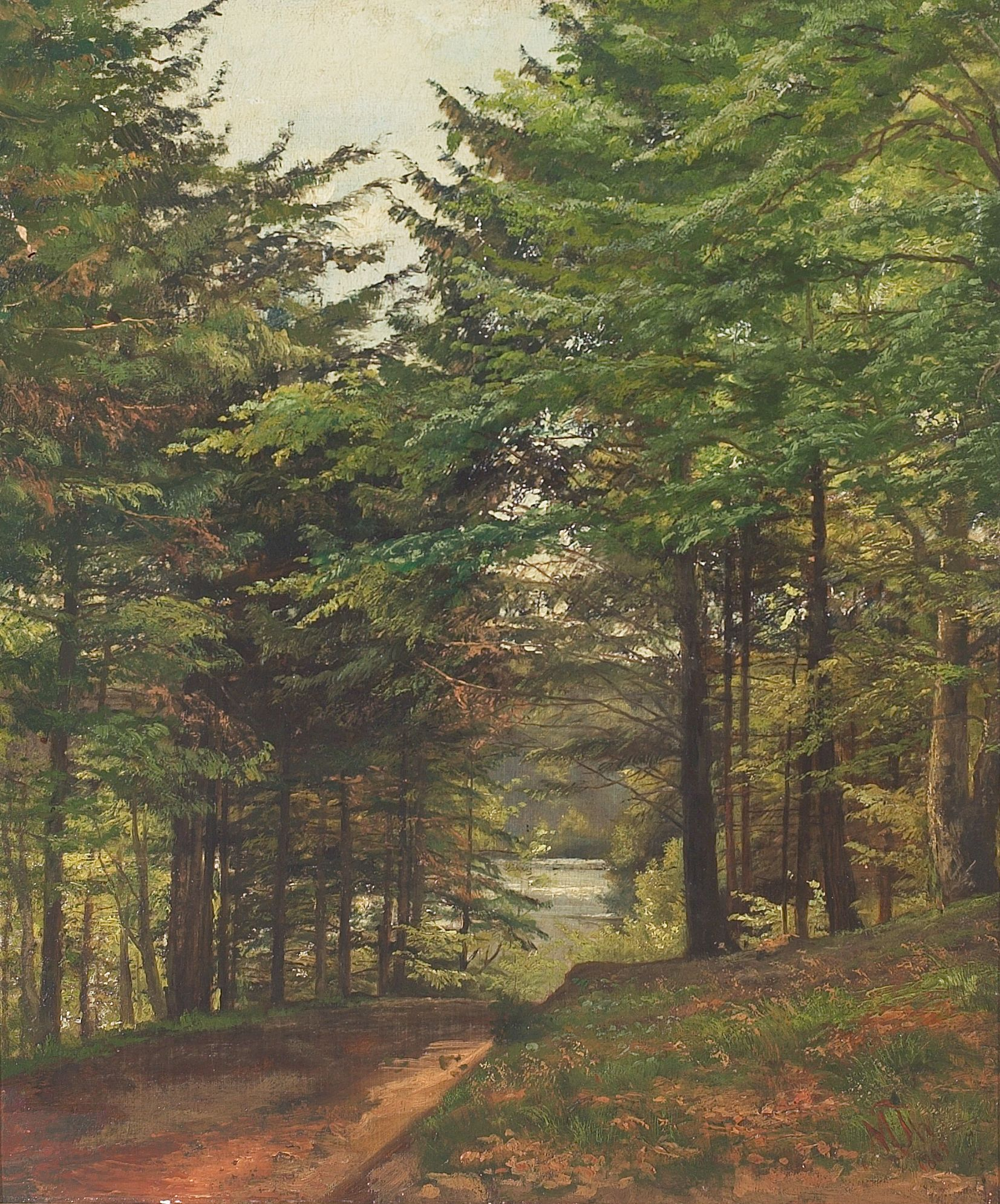
"Scene near Bagsværd Lake, Denmark" - oil on canvas by Elisa Marie Thornam, 1889.

Thornam was born in Kongens Lyngby, Denmark. She died on 22 April 1901 in Copenhagen. Her father was the painter and botanical illustrator Johan Christian Thornam (1822–1908), who taught botanical illustration and served as artist on the Galathea Expedition of 1845. A landscape painter, Thornam was a student of painters Hans Fischer and Andreas Fritz. She colored her father's contributions to the Flora Danica botanical compendium, published 1761-1883. Thornam and her father also collaborated on illustrations for the 1866 Botanisk Tidsskrift, a Danish botanical journal.

== Botanical illustrations ==
Images by C. and M. Thornam from Biodiversity Heritage Library, Botanisk Tiddskrift.

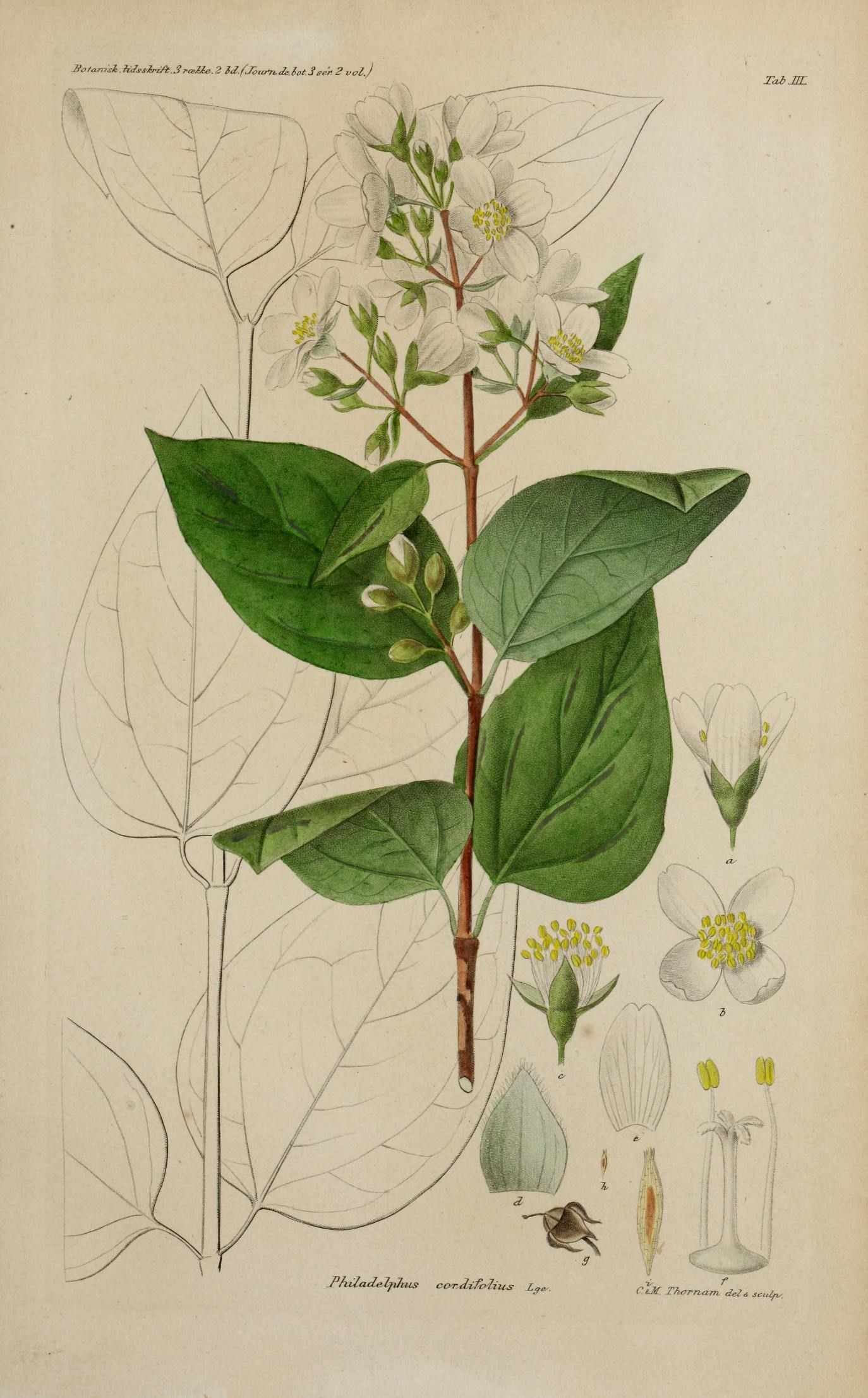
Philadelphus cordifolius (mock orange) - botanical illustration (Tab. III) by C. and M. Thornam for Botanisk Tiddskrift

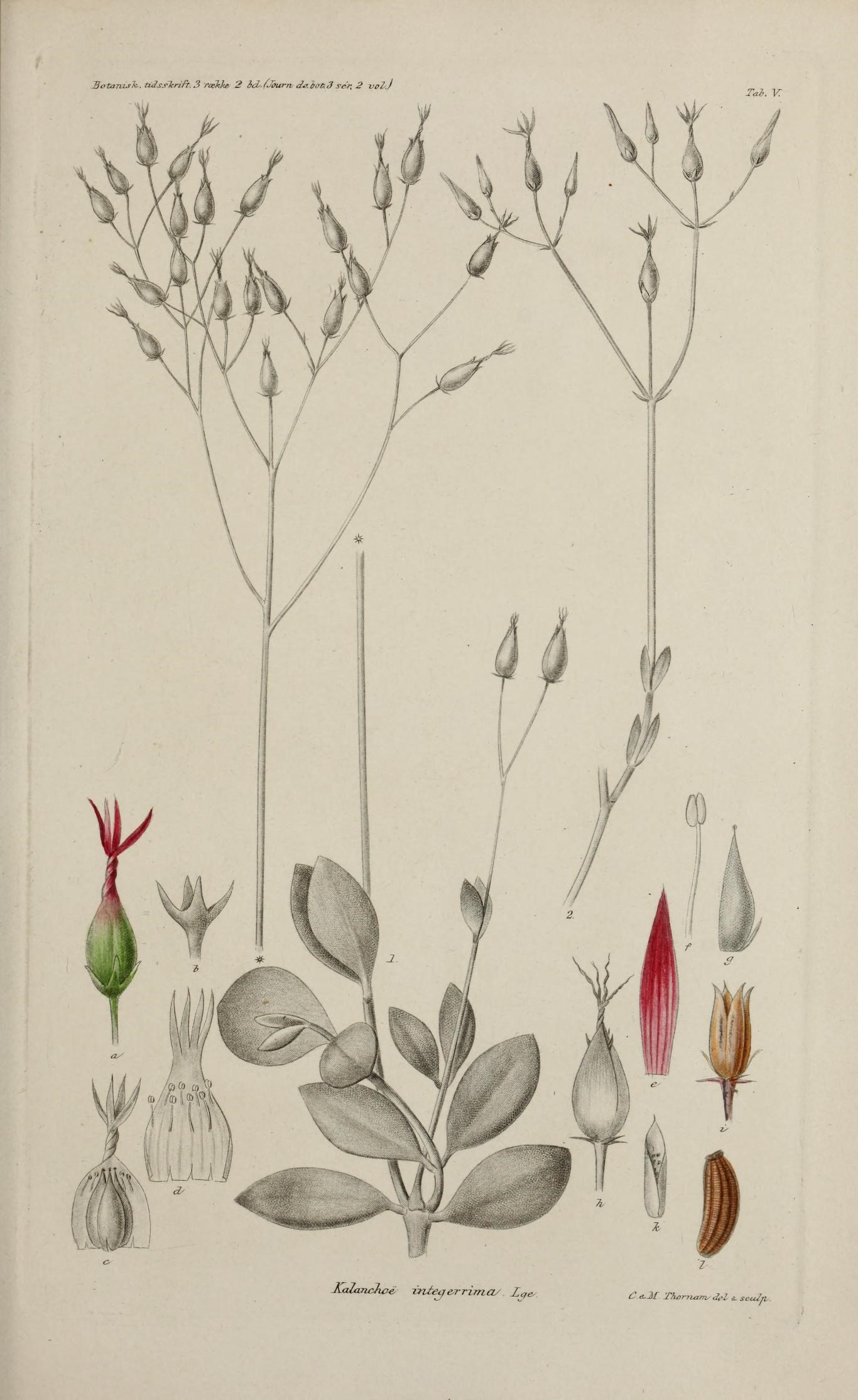
Kalanchoe integerrima - botanical illustration (Tab. V) by C. and M. Thornam for Botanisk Tiddskrift

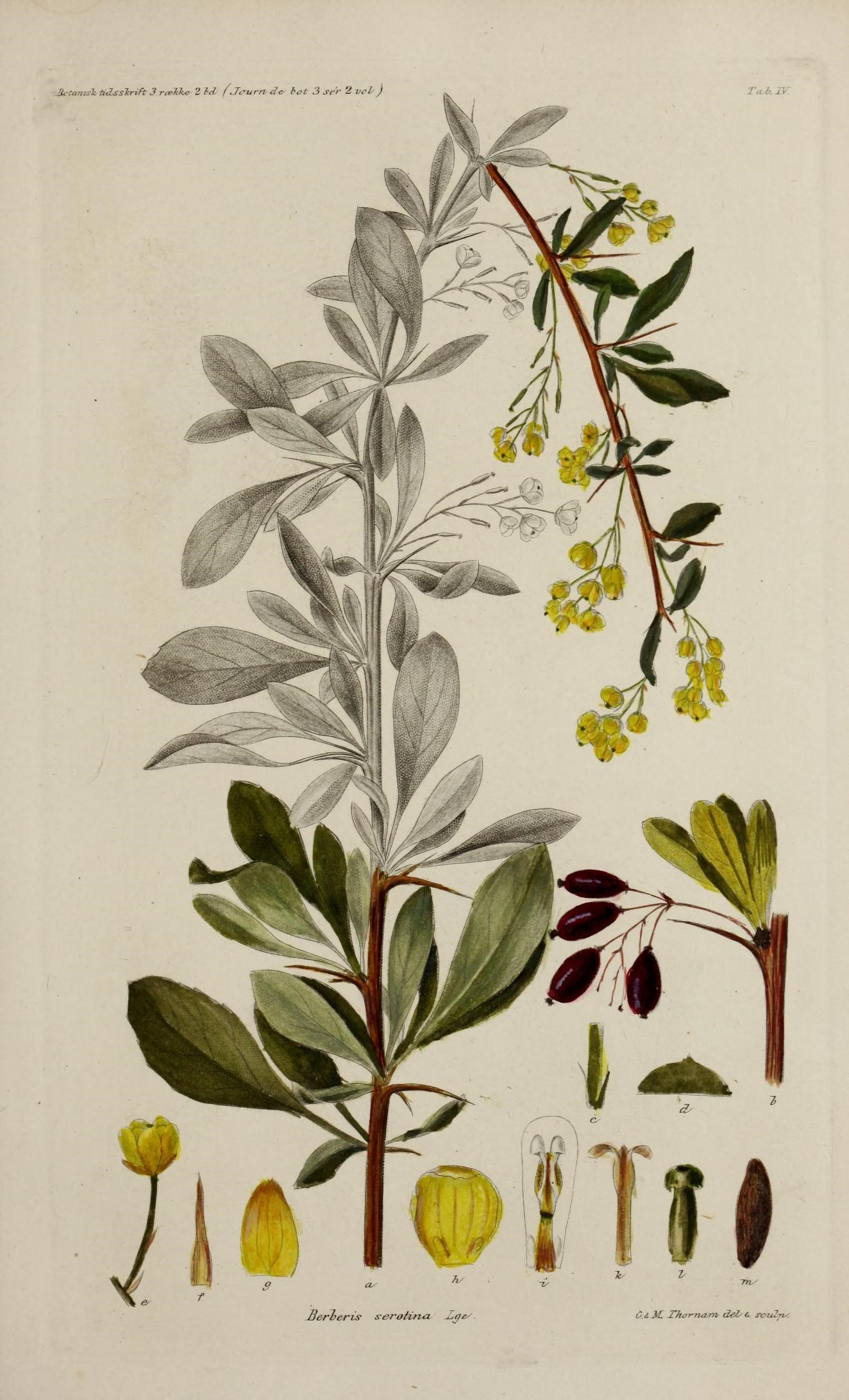
Berberus serotina (barberry) - botanical illustration (Tab. IV) by C. and M. Thornam for Botanisk Tiddskrift

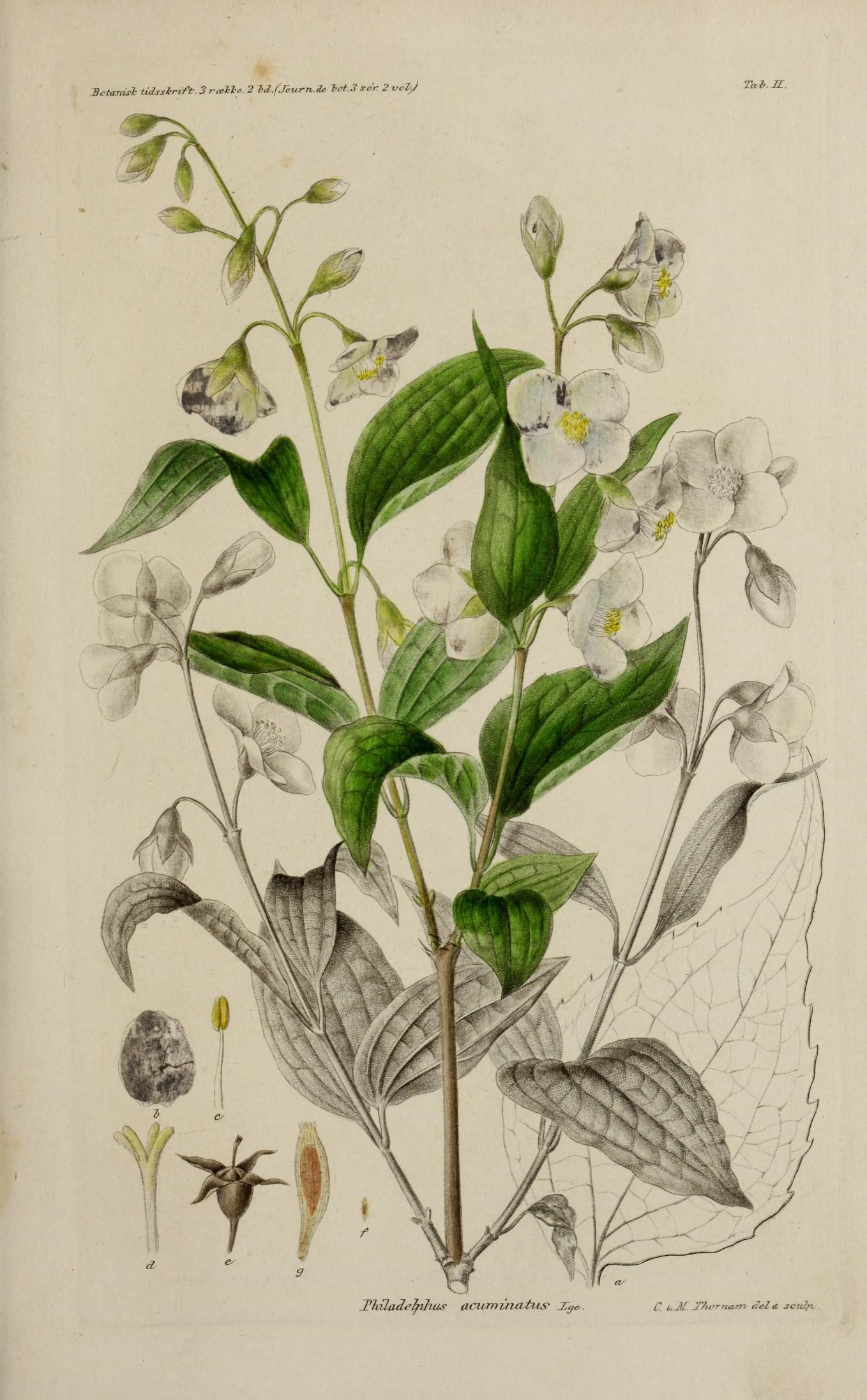
Philadelphus acuminatus (mock orange) - botanical illustration (Tab. II) by C. and M. Thornam for Botanisk Tiddskrift
