= David Lewis (designer) =

British industrial designer (1939–2011)

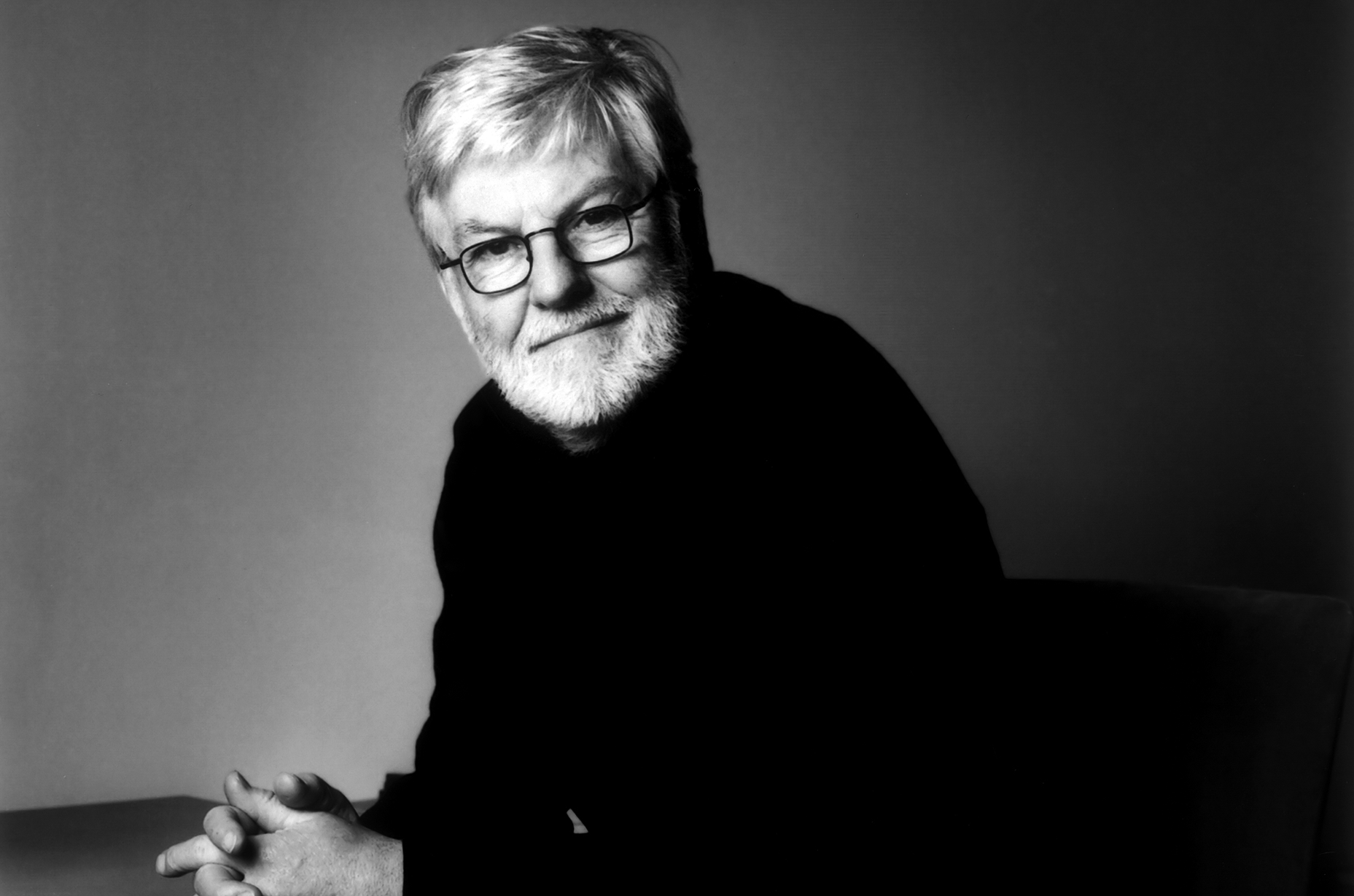
- Born: David Whitfield Lewis; 19 February 1939; London, England
- Died: 8 November 2011 (aged 72); Denmark
- Education: Central School of Art and Design
- Occupation: Industrial designer
- Years active: 1961–2011

David Whitfield Lewis (19 February 1939 – 8 November 2011) was a British industrial designer. He is best known for his work for Bang & Olufsen. He was a distinguished member of Royal Designers for Industry. Several of the products he designed are included in the MoMA permanent collection of design.

== Life ==
David Whitfield Lewis was born in London. He wanted to become a furniture designer, but the class at London's Central School of Art and Design was full. So instead, he decided on education as an industrial designer. He had a keen interest in Danish design and architecture.

He met a Danish au pair, who would later become his wife. The couple moved to Denmark in the 1960s.

== Design ==
Lewis founded David Lewis Designers in Copenhagen, and from this studio, would design a range of products. In the early 1980s, Bang & Olufsen made David Lewis their chief designer. This freelance relationship resulted in numerous international designs. Lewis showed creativity in the projects. His colleagues said he was known for looking at problems differently and searching for new ideas. He worked hard to challenge traditional ways of doing things and to find new methods in his field.

== Selected products ==
- Beocenter 2200 (1983), Hi-Fi system
- Beovision MX 2000 (1985), TV designed like a monitor. ID Award in 1986
- Beolink 1000 (1985), Remote control. ID Award 1986
- Beovox Red Line (1985), Loudspeaker
- Beovision LX 2800 (1986), TV
- Beosound Ouverture (1991), Hi-fi system that presented inserted CDs upright
- Beolab 6000 (1992), loudspeaker. Awards: MOMA 1993, IF 1993
- Beolab 8000 (1992), loudspeaker looking similar to an organ pipe. Awards: MOMA 1993, IF 1993
- Beosound Century (1993), Hi-Fi upright standing. Awards: ID 1994, Good Design Japan 1994
- Beolab LCS 9000 (1993), Active loudspeaker Award: Good Design Japan 1994
- Beo 4 (1994), a very slender remote control
- BeoVision Avant (1995), TV with video tape
- BeoLink Passive (1995), amplifier
- Beosound 9000 (1996), the iconic "6 CDs in a row" Hi-fi system
- Beocenter AV 5 (1997), TV with a radio and CD player
- BeoLab 4000 (1997), active loudspeaker. Awards: IF 1998, Good Design Japan 1998
- Beovision 1 (1999), TV
- Beolab 1 (1999), active loudspeaker.
- Beocenter 6 (2003), free standing television on a stand with an iconic silhouette
- Beosound 3 (2006-2012)
- Beosound 8 (2010), dedicated iPod speakers
- Serenata, mobile telephone with loudspeaker

== Awards ==
David Lewis is currently represented with three Bang & Olufsen products in the permanent design collection of The Museum of Modern Art, New York. He received several other awards and prizes:

- 2007: Honorary fellow, RIBA, Royal Institute of British Architects
- 2003: Danish Design Council Annual Prize
- 2002: Knight of the Dannebrog, Denmark
- 1995: Royal Designer for Industry, London
- 1994: The Danish ID prize
- 1994: The Japanese G-mark Design Award
- 1993: The Japanese G-mark Design Award
- 1992: The Japanese G-mark Prix
- 1991: The Japanese G-mark Design Award
- 1990: The Danish ID prize
- 1990: The Japanese G-mark Design Award
- 1989: The Japanese G-mark Design Award
- 1982: The Danish ID prize
- 1976: The Danish ID prize
