= Legacy Audio =

Maker of high-end audio equipment

- Company type: Private
- Industry: High-end audio, Home audio
- Founded: 1983
- Headquarters: Springfield, IL, United States
- Key people: Bill Dudleston - President & Founder, Chris Daniels - Engineer
- Products: Loudspeakers, Audio electronics
- Website: Legacyaudio.com

Legacy Audio is a manufacturer of high-end audio equipment. The company produces components, passive loudspeakers, and active powered speakers.

== History ==
Founder Bill Dudleston has provided Legacy speaker monitors for Arista, Sony, Universal Music Group, and archival organizations such as the Stradivari Violin Society. Multi-Grammy award-winning producers Rick Rubin and Antonio "L.A." Reid, and renowned mastering engineer Herb Powers, have utilized the Legacy designs as assisting in producing artists Sheryl Crow, Johnny Cash, Tom Petty, Red Hot Chili Peppers, Mariah Carey, and Usher. Re-mastering engineer Steve Hoffman has utilized the Legacy speakers on re-issues of Elvis Presley, Frank Sinatra and Nat King Cole.

Legacy Audio and Dudleston have been cited in publications such as Billboard, The Wall Street Journal, Stereophile, The Absolute Sound, Home Theater Magazine, and the Robb Report.
