= Fridrik Thordarson =

Icelandic linguist (1928–2005)

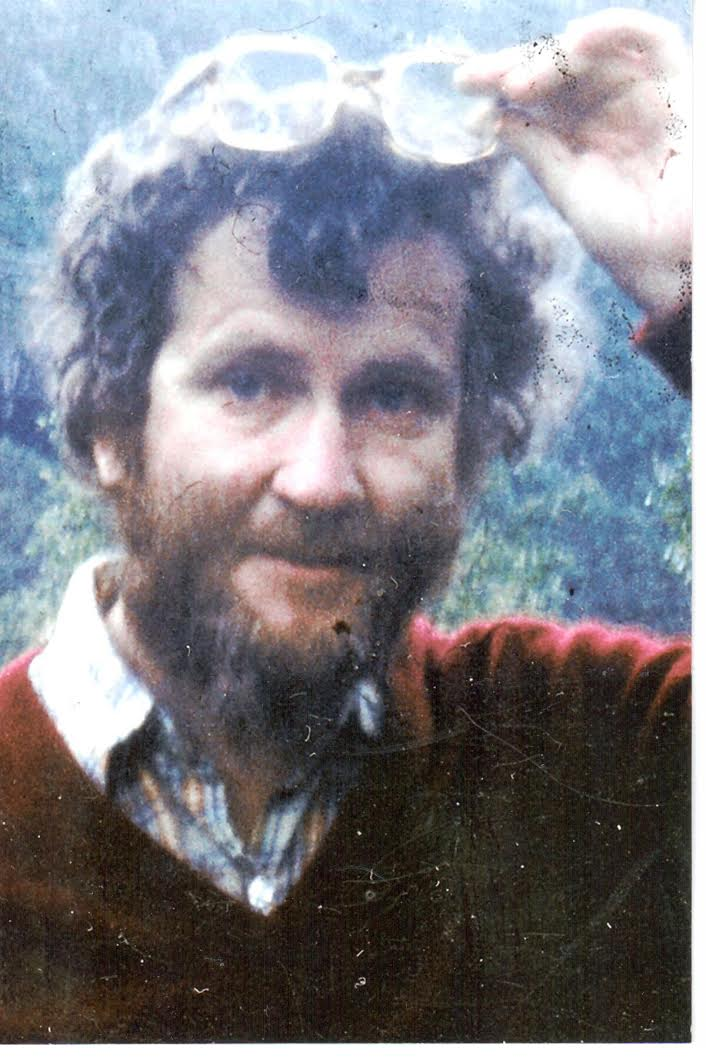

Fridrik Thordarson (1928 – 2 October 2005) was an Icelandic linguist. Thordarson was born in Iceland, and studied Classical philology in Oslo. In 1963 he took exams with Latin as his major and Greek and Indian philology as his minors. From 1965 onwards he taught classical philology as a lecturer. He became professor in 1994. Thordarson worked for most of his life in Norway.

Apart from Classical languages, he became an expert in Caucasian languages such as Georgian and Ossetic. He also published a grammar of Ossetic. Thordarson was a regular contributor and a consulting editor to Encyclopaedia Iranica.

== Sources ==
- University of Frankfurt

== Bibliography ==
- Ossetic Grammatical Studies. Wien: Verlag der österreichischen Akademie der Wissenschaften, 2009. ISBN 9783700165644
- An article on Ossetic grammar(in English) by Fridrik Thordarson
- Media related to Fridrik Thordarson at Wikimedia Commons
