= Bang & Olufsen =

Danish audio-visual products company

Bang & Olufsen A/S
- Type: Public
- Traded as: Nasdaq Copenhagen: BO B
- Founded: 1925; 101 years ago
- Founder: Peter Bang; Svend Olufsen
- Headquarters: Struer, Denmark
- Number of locations: 70 countries (2023)
- Key people: Gianfilippo Testa (CEO); Jesper Hessel (Chief Commercial Officer & Deputy CEO); Nikolaj Wendelboe (Chief Operating Officer & Chief Financial Officer); Juha Christensen (Chairman)
- Products: High-end audio
- Revenue: ▼2.59 billion kr. (2023)
- Operating income: ▲61 million kr. (2023)
- Net income: ▼ -17 million kr. (2023)
- AUM: ▼1.43 billion kr. (2023)
- Total assets: ▼2.3 billion kr. (2023)
- Total equity: ▼956 million kr. (2023)
- Number of employees: 1000 (2023)
- Website: www.bang-olufsen.com

Bang & Olufsen A/S (B&O) is a Danish high-end consumer electronics company that designs and manufactures audio products, television sets, and telephones, originally from Denmark, founded in 1925 by Peter Bang and Svend Olufsen, who designed a radio to work with alternating current, a product of significance at a time when most radios were still running on batteries.

== History ==
=== Early history ===
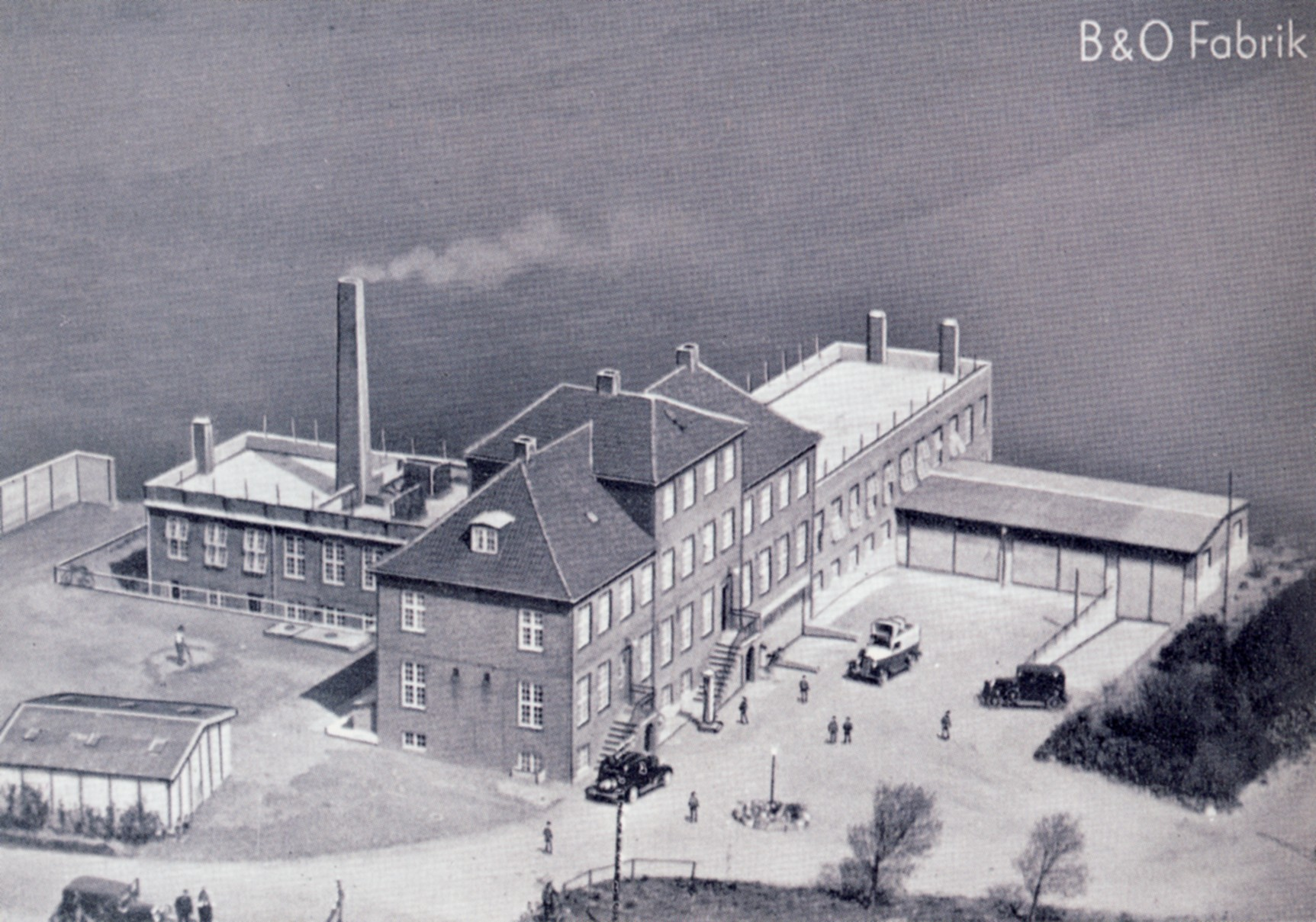
B&O's factory in Struer 1938

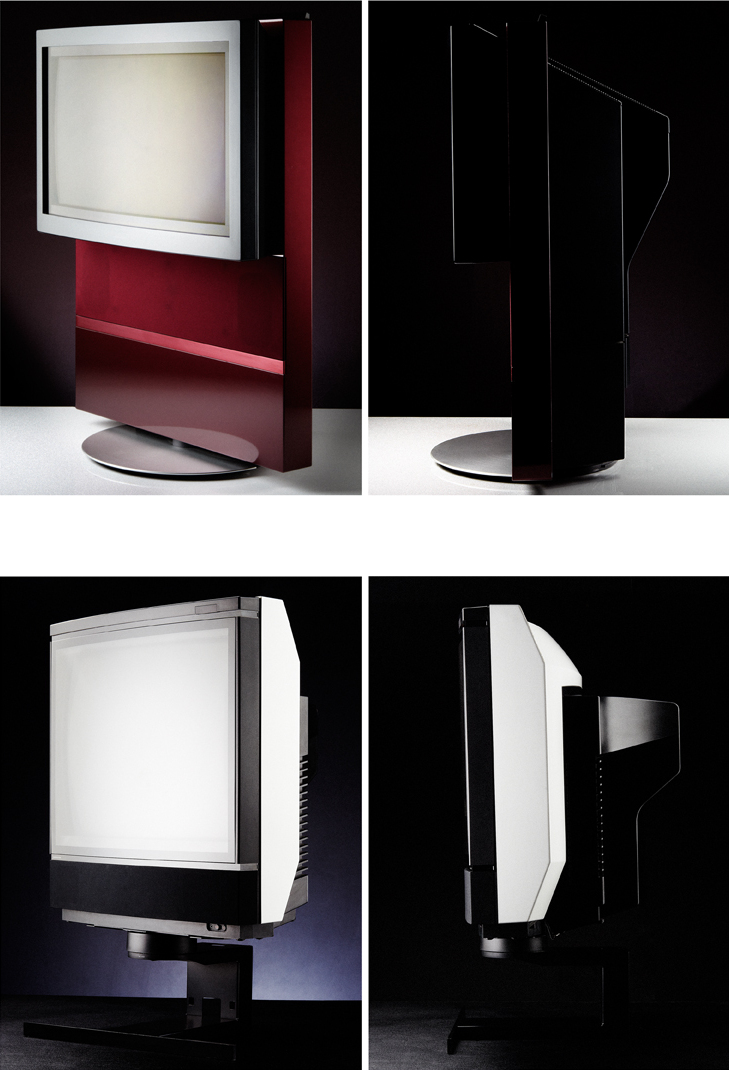
Bang Olufsen Beovision Televisions Avant & MX5000

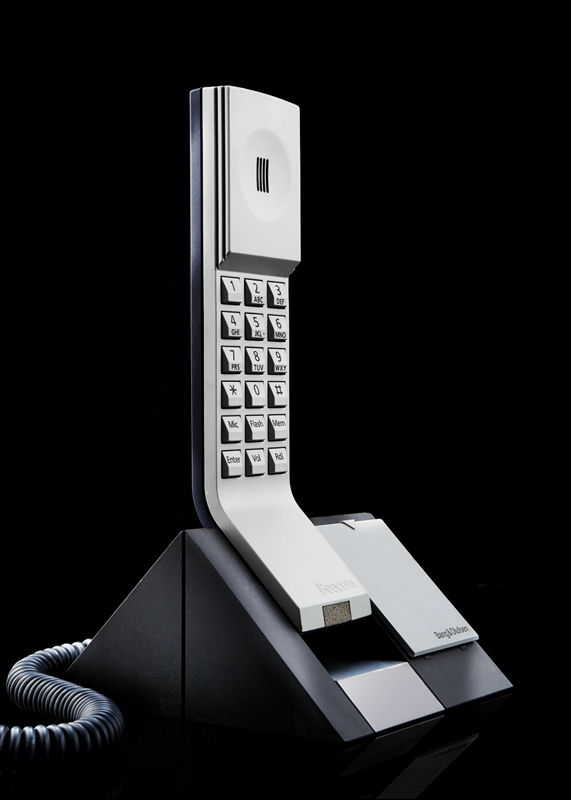
Bang Olufsen Beocom 1401 telephone

Peter Bang (1900–1957), son of Camillo Bang, a successful Danish businessman, showed great interest in radio technology from an early age. After graduating as an engineer in 1924, he spent six months working in a radio factory in the USA. When he returned to Denmark, he collaborated with his friend Svend Olufsen (1897–1949), whose parents made the attic of their manor house in Struer in Jutland available for experiments. When they officially opened their business in 1925, Bang focused on the technology while Olufsen was dealing with business. There were a number of successful developments in the 1930s and 1940s, including a sound recording system for the film industry, roof-mounted loudspeakers for circuses and army vehicles, and the iconic Beolit 39 radio that featured a Bakelite cabinet.

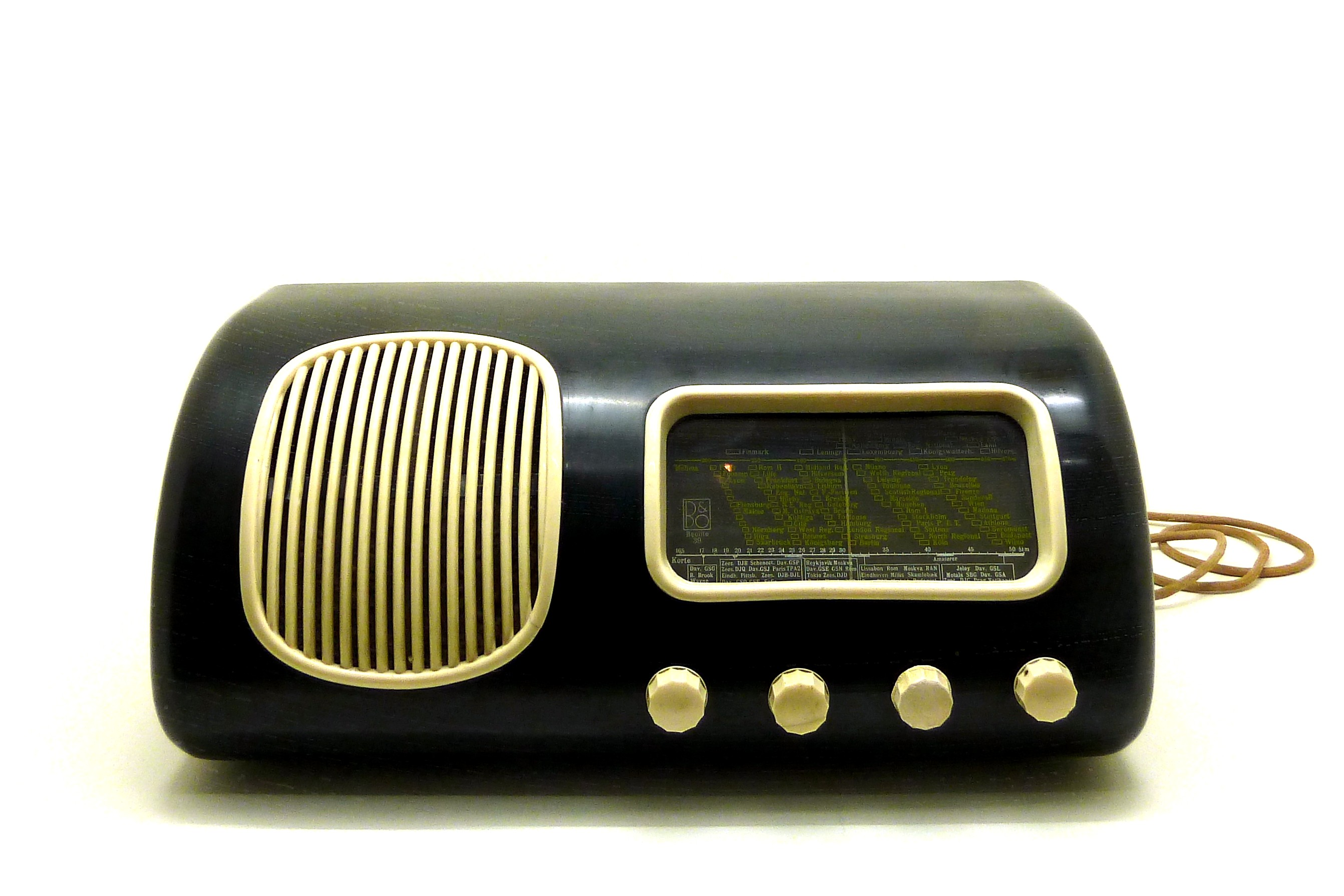
Beolit 39 from 1938, B&O's first radio in Bakelite

However, it was many years before their business became significantly profitable. The firm suffered a major setback towards the end of World War II when its factory at Gimsing was burnt down by pro-Nazi saboteurs as a punishment for the management's refusal to team up with the Germans. Undeterred, Bang and Olufsen rebuilt the factory, and they produced electric razors until 1955, and then moving on to develop a range of radio, radiogram, and television sets, that was influenced later by a designer named Ib Fabiansen who began work for the company in 1957.

In the 1990s, B&O opened its dedicated stores, selling directly to customers but not selling through retailers, and the production of audio separates was discontinued in favor of mini-type audio systems sold, as was before for B&O, at a price that was higher than the industry average.

=== Recent history ===
Because of the 2008 financial crisis, the company experienced a sharp decline in sales and announced significant losses; between 2008 and 2009, annual revenue declined from $853 million to $528 million, and its stock price dropped from $52 to $8.50. A restructuring plan included 300 layoffs in Denmark on 21 October 2008, and the abandonment of development of new mobile phones, MP3 players, and standalone systems like DVD2 and HDR2. Instead, the company focused on its traditional strengths: high-quality audio and video products as well as sound systems for the automotive industry. B&O returned to profitability in 2010.

In January 2015, B&O revealed that the firm would consider bid approaches from competitors due to a profit warning issued at the end of 2014.

In March 2015, HP Inc. announced that B&O would become the company's new premium audio partner for its computers and other devices after Beats takeover by Apple.

In May 2015, Harman International announced the completion of its acquisition of Bang & Olufsen's car audio business.

In March 2017, Tymphany, an audio ODM based in Hong Kong and with manufacturing operations in Dongchen, announced the acquisition of the engineering and manufacturing operation in the Czech Republic from Bang & Olufsen.

In Aug 2017, LG announced that B&O would become the company's new premium audio partner for its mobile devices.

In January 2020, Bang & Olufsen A/S reported its third consecutive quarterly loss as the Danish hi-fi maker struggled with a buildup of inventory after consumers balked at buying $500 headphones.

In 2023, Bang & Olufsen delivered a record-high gross margin and an improved EBIT margin for 2023/24 despite a decline in revenue. Group revenue was DKK 2,588m, 5% down year-on-year.

== Operations and products ==
Despite its decision to suspend the manufacture of separate components, B&O continues to develop and market loudspeakers. Its flagship speaker, the BeoLab 5, uses digital signal processing to adjust its frequency response to the room and location in which it is placed. Its midrange and treble drivers use the audio lens technology developed by Sausalito Audio's Manny LaCarrubba to spread the sound over a 180-degree range in order to fill the room, overcoming the directional range limitations of normal midrange and treble drivers, and preventing the sound from reflecting off the ceiling and floor before reaching the listener. B&O later acquired the audio lens technology in 2007.

In 2003, B&O entered into an agreement with Audi to provide an advanced sound system and in 2005 a sound system based on the BeoLab 5 with 1000 W amplifiers became available to Audi's flagship model, the A8. Audi markets this sound system using the Bang & Olufsen brand name. A unique feature of this sound system is its motorized tweeters that emerge from the dashboard when the sound system is turned on.

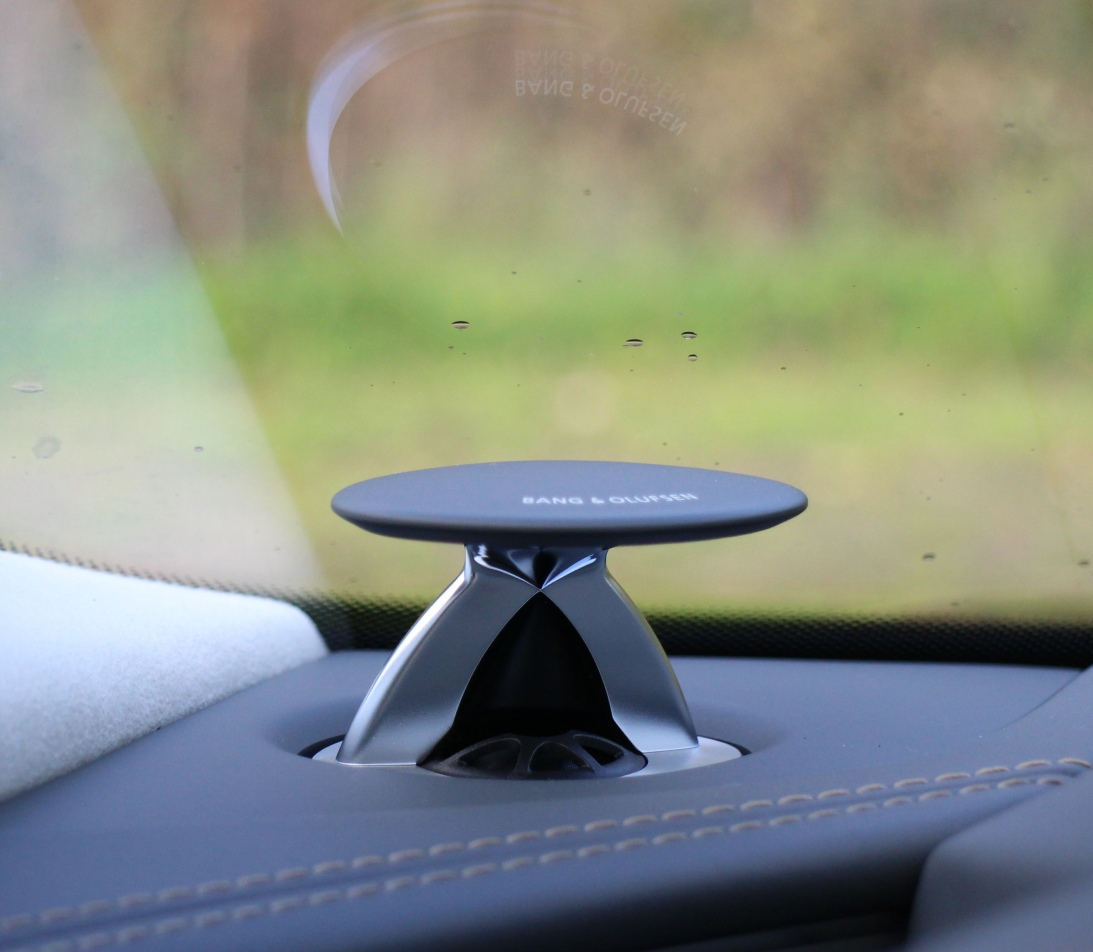
Tweeter in a third-generation Audi A8

Audi also extended the optional advanced sound system to their A4, A5, A6, A7, A8, Q5, Q7, TT and R8 models. It is a US$6,300 option on the A8/Q7. B&O also supplies sound systems for higher-end, premium vehicles such as the Aston Martin DBS, Rapide, BMW 5 Series, BMW 5 Series Gran Turismo, BMW 6 Series, BMW M6, BMW's flagship 7 Series, BMW X5, Ford in their high-end models of vehicles, Genesis with their GV60, GV70, GV80, G80 and G90 premium high-end models of vehicles and also Mercedes-Benz with their Mercedes-AMG models of vehicles.

In addition to consumer products the company also produces business-to-business services, particularly in the area of custom audio-visual installations for car manufacturers, and the hospitality industry. Additionally the company's expertise in aluminium manufacturing is available to other businesses for the production of non-B&O products.

=== Design ===
B&O has a distinctive design appeal that Wired described as "quality media delivery via striking objects". Their work with radios and loudspeakers led them to value high-fidelity musical reproduction uninfluenced by technological limitations; in Danish Ærlig musikgengivelse, meaning "honest music reproduction". To this end, psychoacoustics was important to designing and testing B&O products.

By 1960, B&O had begun its foray into global markets with star designers Henning Moldenhawer and Jacob Jensen, who designed 234 products (Note: "Jensen designed 234 products for the company") for B&O from 1965 to 1985. (Note: "His work for Danish company Bang & Olufsen (1965-1985)") B&O hires designers rather than directly employing them in the company. David Lewis, who became involved with B&O in 1965 then went on to design most of the company's products after 1980. In 1978, the Museum of Modern Art in New York City held an exhibition dedicated to Bang & Olufsen designs. It is known to give its designers a lot of free rein. Bang & Olufsen has also collaborated with contemporary designers, including Benjamin Hubert, Michael Anastassiades, and Cecilie Manz.

It also has been debated that Apple's iPod design was inspired by B&O's BeoCom 6000, a wireless telephone designed by Henrik Sørig Thomsen with a wheel to scroll.

== Subsidiaries ==
- ICEpower a/s was formed in 1999 as a joint venture between B&O and Karsten Nielsen. The company is a technology research and design organization working in the field of switching type Class-D amplifier.
- Bang & Olufsen Medicom a/s manufacturers and designs medical products such as inhalers and automatic syringes.
- Bang & Olufsen Telecom a/s.
- B&O PLAY is the newest member of the Bang & Olufsen family launched in 2012.

== Partnerships ==
- John Legend
- HP
- Xbox
- Cisco
- Sagemcom
- Origin Acoustics as Brand Manager
- Acura
- Scuderia Ferrari
- Williams Racing as an official team partner.
- City of Monaco
- Caroline Wozniacki and her husband David Lee as brand ambassadors
- Moses Itauma
- Polsat Box

== See also ==
- Beocenter 9500
- List of phonograph manufacturers
