= Listed buildings in Struer Municipality =

This is a list of listed buildings in Struer Municipality, Denmark.

== The list ==
Listing name	Image	Location	Year built	Summary	Ref
Ausumgård		Holstebrovej 101, 7560 Hjerm	c. 1777		671-4833-1
Grisetåodde Lighthouse		Gl Færgevej 0, 7600 Struer		1909	Ref1
Hindsel		Hindselsvej 24, 7790 Thyholm	1760		Ref
Quistrup		Hjermvej 59, 7600 Struer	c. 1814		671-37081-1 Ref
