= Aalborg =

Aalborg Ålborg
- City
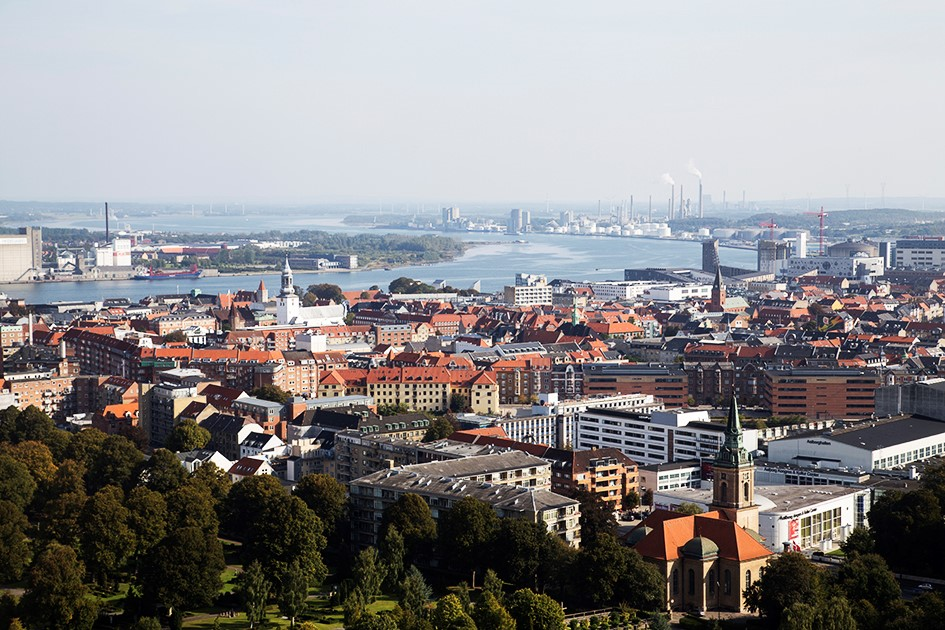
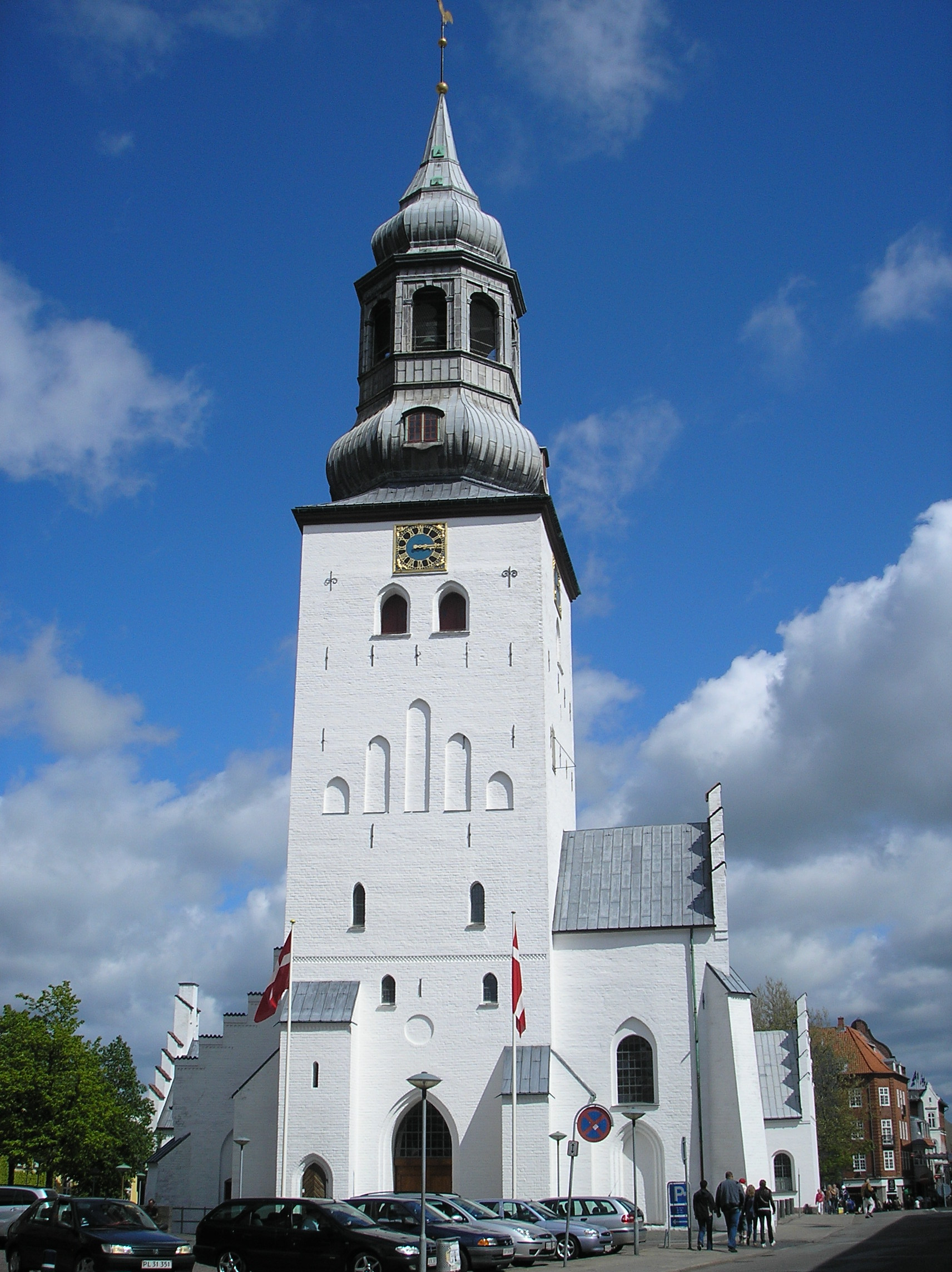
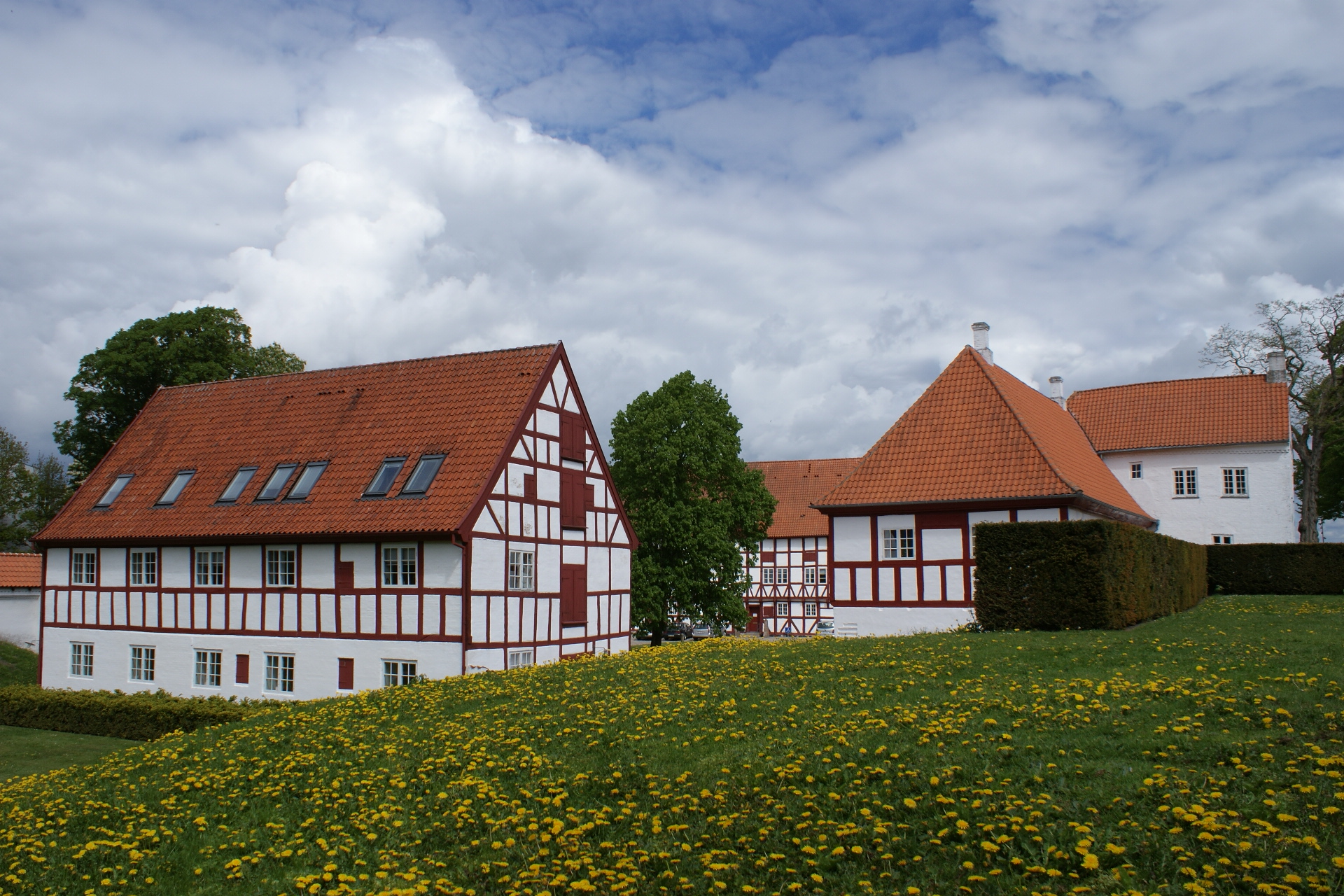
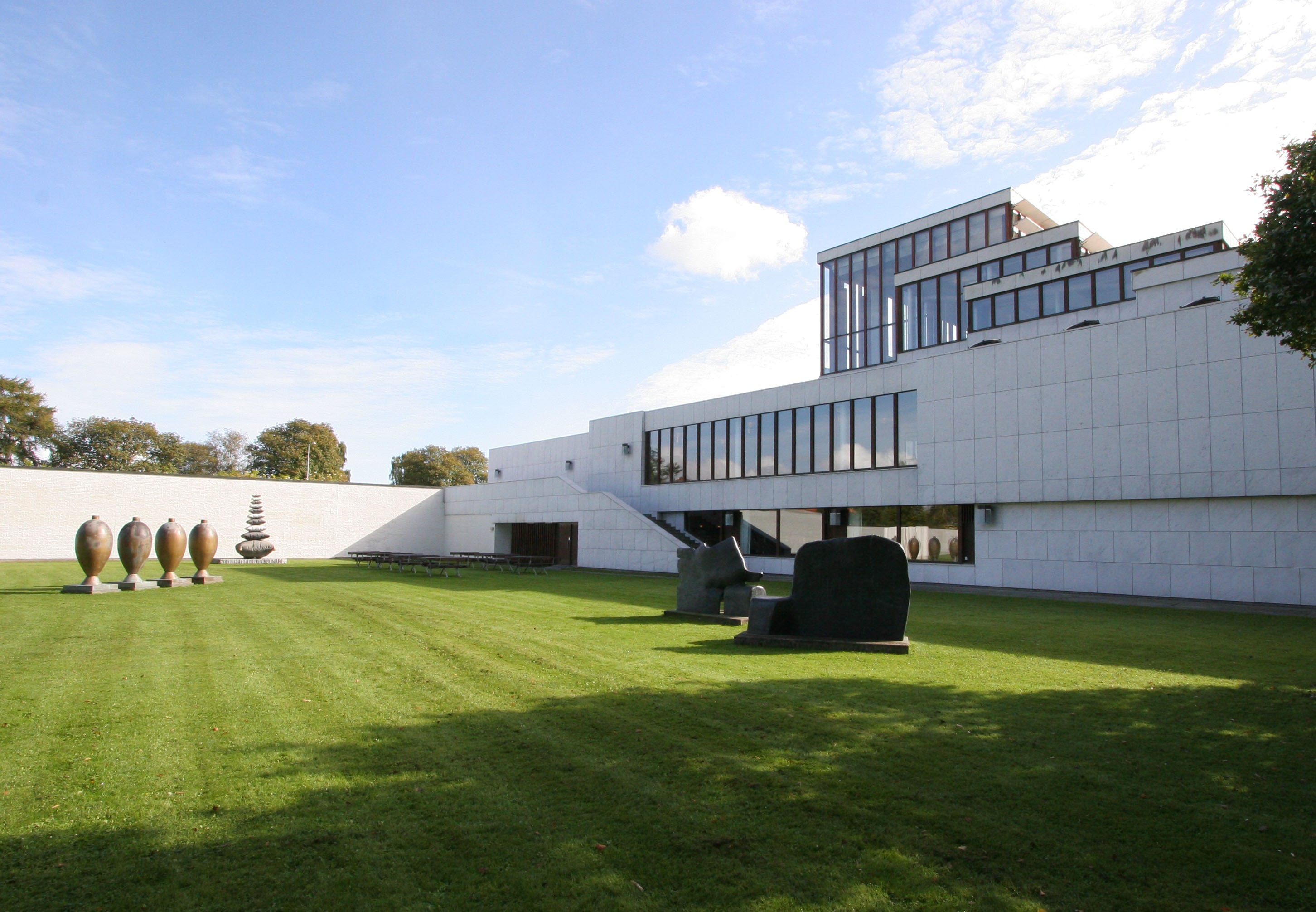
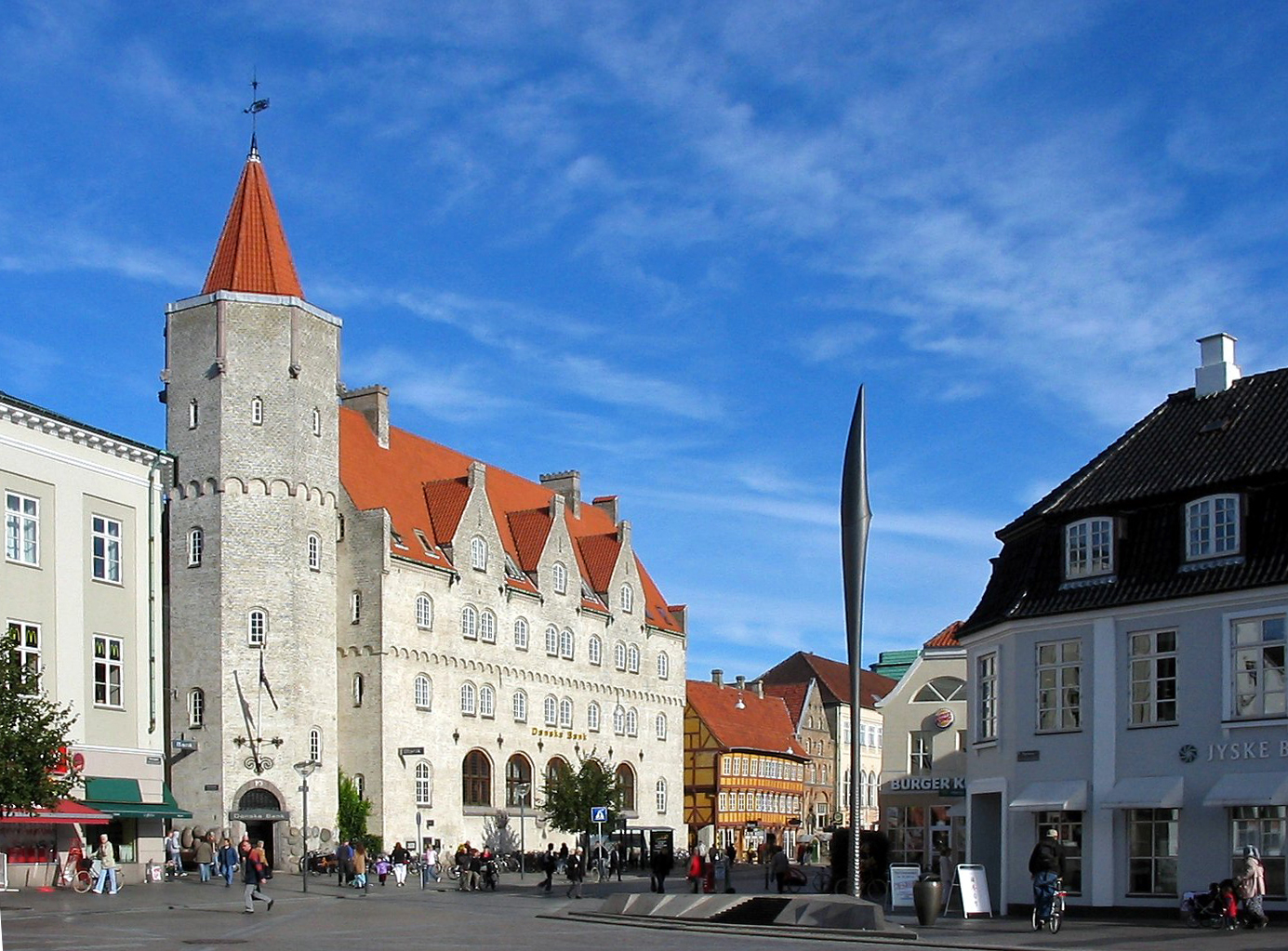
- View over Aalborg from the Aalborg Tower Budolfi Church Aalborghus KUNSTEN Nytorv Square

- Coat of arms
- Nicknames: "Paris of the North", locally "Double A"
- Location within North Jutland Location within Denmark Location within Scandinavia
- Coordinates: 57°03′N 09°55′E
- Country: Denmark
- Region: North Denmark
- Municipality: Aalborg
- First mention: "Alabu" written on coins c. 1035
- Official establishment: 16 June 1342

Government
  - Mayor: Lasse Frimand Jensen (S)

Area
  - City: 50.70 km^{2} (19.58 sq mi)
  - Urban: 61.30 km^{2} (23.67 sq mi)
  - Municipal: 1,137.3 km^{2} (439.1 sq mi)
- Elevation: 55 m (180 ft)

Population (2022)
  - City: 119,862
  - Density: 2,364.14/km^{2} (6,123.1/sq mi)
  - Urban: 143,598
  - Urban density: 2,342.54/km^{2} (6,067.2/sq mi)
  - Municipality: 221,082
  - Municipality density: 194.39/km^{2} (503.5/sq mi)
- Demonym: Aalborgenser
- Time zone: UTC+1 (Central Europe Time)
  - Summer (DST): UTC+2
- Postal codes: 9000, 9008, 9020, 9100, 9200, 9210, 9220, 9400
- Area code: (+45) 9
- Website: aalborg.dk

Aalborg or Ålborg (/ˈɑːlbɔːrɡ/ AHL-borg, US also /ˈɔːl-/ AWL-; Danish: [ˈʌlˌpɒˀ]) is Denmark's fourth largest city (behind Copenhagen, Aarhus, and Odense) with a population of 119,862 (1 July 2022) in the town proper and an urban population of 143,598 (1 July 2022). As of 1 July 2022, the Municipality of Aalborg had a population of 221,082, making it the third most populous in the country after the municipalities of Copenhagen (capital) and Aarhus. Eurostat and OECD have used a definition for the metropolitan area of Aalborg (referred to as a "functional urban area"), which includes all municipalities in the province (Danish: landsdel) of North Jutland (Danish: Nordjylland), with a total population of 594,323 as of 1 July 2022.

By road Aalborg is 64 kilometres (40 mi) southwest of Frederikshavn, and 118 kilometres (73 mi) north of Aarhus. The distance to Copenhagen is 412 kilometres (256 mi) by road without using ferries.

The earliest settlements date to around AD 700. Aalborg's position at the narrowest point on the Limfjord made it an important harbour during the Middle Ages, and later a large industrial centre. Architecturally, the city is known for its half-timbered mansions built by its prosperous merchants. Budolfi Church, now a cathedral, dates from the end of the 14th century and Aalborghus Castle, a royal residence, was built in 1550. Today, Aalborg is a city in transition from a working-class industrial area to a knowledge-based community. A major exporter of grain, cement, and liquors, its business interests include Siemens Gamesa Renewable Energy, Alfa Laval, and Aalborg Portland. These companies have become global producers of wind turbine rotors, marine boilers, and cement.

With its theatres, symphony orchestra, opera company, performance venues, and museums such as Aalborg Historical Museum and the Aalborg Museum of Modern Art, Aalborg is an important cultural hub. The Aalborg Carnival, held at the end of May, is one of the largest festivals in Scandinavia, attracting some 100,000+ people annually. The town's major university is Aalborg University (often abbreviated to AAU), founded in 1974, which has more than 20,000 students (as of 2018). AAU is also North Jutland's largest university. The University College of Northern Denmark (UCN) is one of seven new regional organisations while the Royal School of Library and Information Science (RSLIS) provides higher education in library and information science. Trænregimentet, the Danish regiment for army supply and emergency medical personnel, is also in Aalborg. Aalborg University Hospital, the largest in the north of Jutland, was founded in 1881.

The football club Aalborg BK, established in 1885 and based at Nordjyske Arena, won the Danish Superliga in the 1994–95 season, the 1998–99 season, the 2007–08 season, and the 2013–14 season. Other sports associations include the ice hockey club Aalborg Pirates, the men's handball team Aalborg Håndbold, the rugby club Aalborg RK, and Aalborg Cricket Club. Aalborg Railway Station, on John F. Kennedys Plads has connected the city to Randers and the south since 1869. Aalborg Airport is just 6 kilometres (3.7 mi) northwest of the city centre.

A 2014 survey by the European Commission found that the citizens of Aalborg are the most satisfied people in Europe with their city.

== Name ==
The name of Aalborg can be traced back to coins from the 11th century in the form of Alabu or Alabur. Like Aabenraa, there has been dissent regarding the spelling of the city's name. In current times, the modern name of Aalborg is nearly always written with a double-a instead of the Danish standard letter for that sound, å. Å was implemented to replace "aa" in all Danish place names on 22 March 1948 as a result of a Danish spelling reform. However, the city council in Aalborg made the unanimous decision to ignore the new law and keep the old way of spelling, stating:

"Upon receiving a copy of the Ministry of Education's notice of 22 March 1948 about changes to orthography, according to which Aalborg's name henceforth shall be spelled Ålborg, the executive committee relays, that the city council – regardless of the notice – enacts that the city's name – as up until now – is spelled Aalborg, since the city's name with this way of spelling is known world-over. This was agreed upon unanimously."

In 1984, then Minister of Education Bertel Haarder and Minister of Culture Mimi Jakobsen, decided that the municipalities of Denmark could decide for themselves which way of spelling they preferred. This went against the Danish Language Council and the Toponomy Committee's advice. Both spellings are included in the official list of placenames. It is never orthographically wrong to write Ålborg though it might upset local residents, many of whom identify strongly with the traditional spelling of the name. Aalborg is locally known as "Dobbelt A" (Double A) and the local rapper Niarn has even made a song about the city of the same name. The city has also been nicknamed "Nordens Paris" (Paris of the North).

== History ==
The area around the narrowest point on the Limfjord attracted settlements as far back as the Iron Age, leading to a thriving Viking community until around the year 1000 in what has now become Aalborg. In the Middle Ages, the town grew thanks to royal trading privileges, a natural harbour and a thriving herring fishing industry. The following centuries brought difficulties, but the city began to prosper again towards the end of the 19th century when a bridge was built over Limfjord and the railway arrived. Aalborg's initial growth relied on heavy industry but its current development focuses on culture and education.

=== Beginnings ===
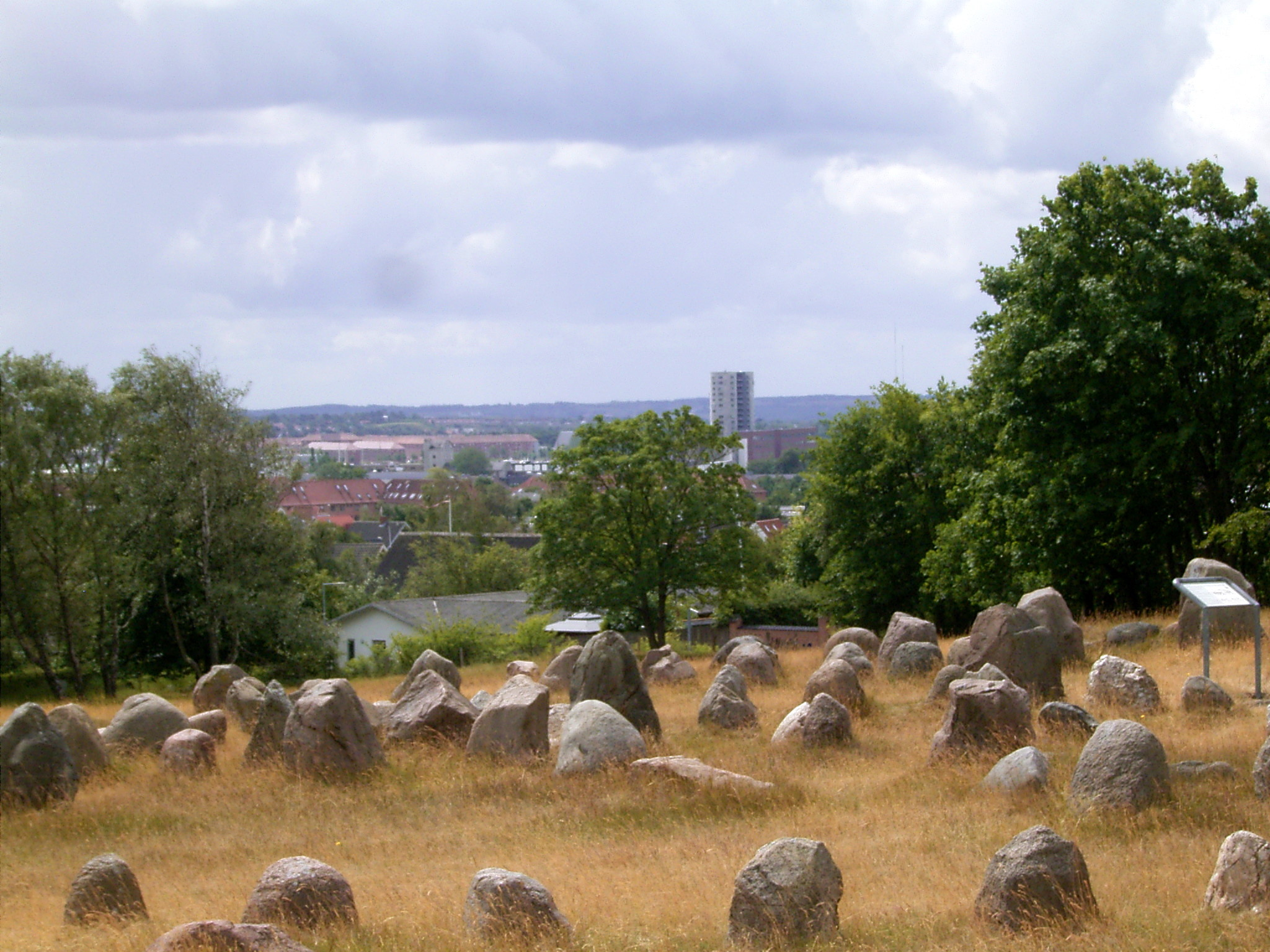
Lindholm Høje

Hardeknud coin embossed Alabu (c. 1040), the original name of Aalborg

Aalborg traces its history back over a thousand years. It was originally settled as a trading post because of its position on the Limfjord. The sites of what were two settlements and a burial ground can be seen on Lindholm Høje, a hill overlooking the city. These large settlements, one from the sixth-century Germanic Iron Age, the other from the Viking Age in the 9th to 11th centuries, evolved at the narrowest point on Limfjord as a result of the traffic between Himmerland to the south and Vendsyssel to the north.

The first mention of Aalborg under its original name Alabu or Alabur on coins from c.1040 when King Harthacnut (Hardeknud) settled in the area. In c.1075, Adam of Bremen reported that Alaburg, as he called it in German, was an important harbour for ships sailing to Norway. In Valdemar's Danish Census Book from 1231 it was called Aleburgh, possibly meaning "the fort by the stream" as in Old Norse all meant "stream" or "current" and bur or burgh a fort or a castle. The Church of Our Lady in Aalborg was built in the early 12th century but demolished during the Reformation. Similarly, the Franciscan friary, or Greyfriars, on the east side of Østerå, was probably built around 1240; it was documented in 1268, but like many other Roman Catholic monasteries and convents was shut down in 1530 as a result of the Reformation.

=== Middle Ages ===
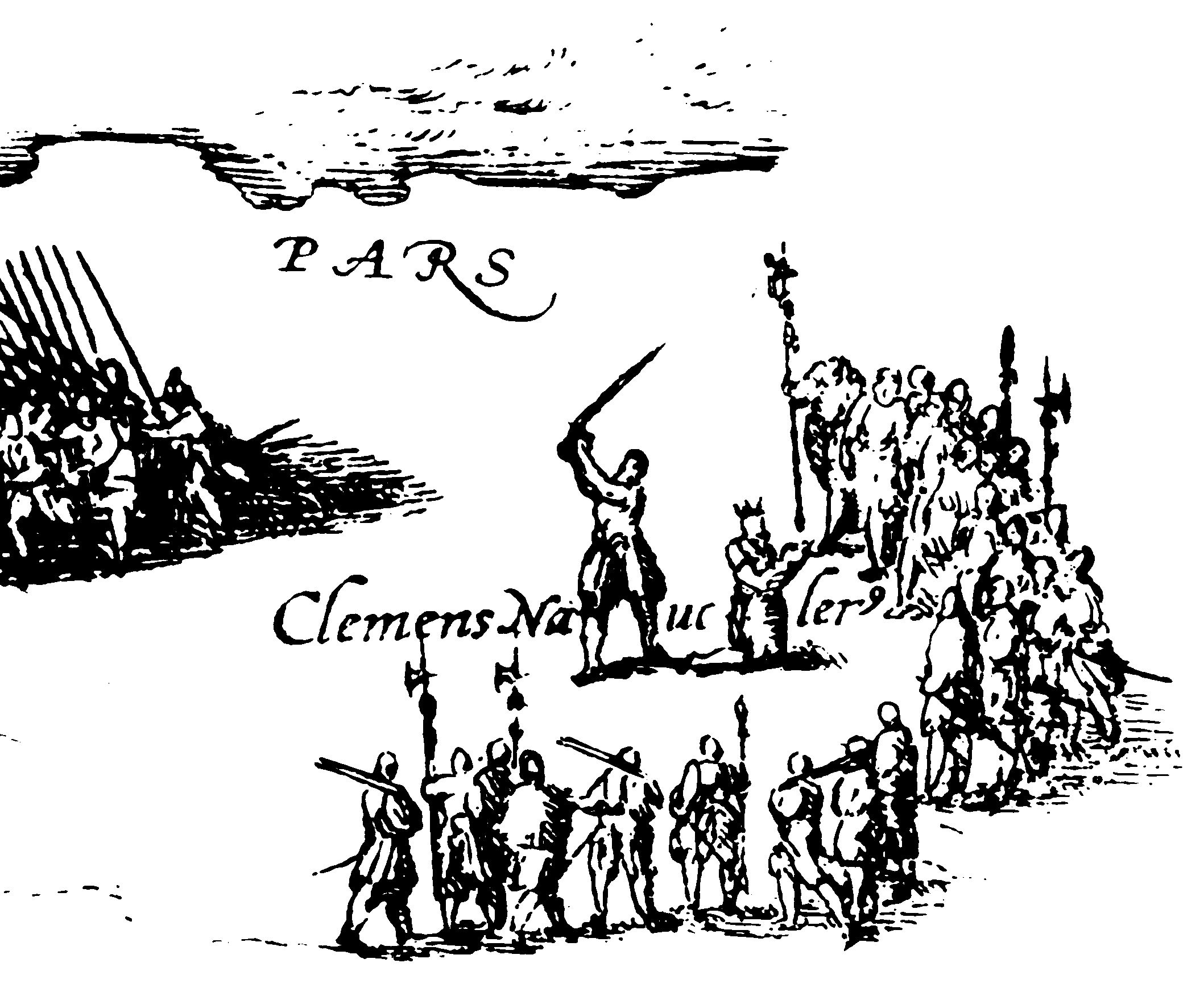
Execution of the rebel Skipper Clement in Viborg, 1536 (engraving by an unknown author, 1574)

Aalborg's earliest trading privileges date from 1342, when King Valdemar IV received the town as part of his huge dowry on marrying Helvig of Schleswig. The privileges were extended by Eric of Pomerania in 1430 and by Christopher of Bavaria in 1441. The town prospered, becoming one of the largest communities in Denmark. Its prosperity increased when the merchant- and trade association Guds Legems Laug was established in 1481, facilitating trade with the Hanseatic League, especially from 1516 when Christian II granted it a monopoly in salting Limfjord's herring. The king often visited the town, where he held court and stayed in the old Aalborghus. The herring fishery linked Aalborg to the East coast of England, across the North Sea, both in commercial competition and cultural exchange. During the Middle Ages a number of important institutions were established in Aalborg, including Budolfi Cathedral in the late 14th century and the Hospital of the Holy Ghost, a monastery and nunnery founded in 1451 to help those in need. It was converted into a hospital during the Reformation and is still in use today as a nursing home for the elderly.

In 1530 a large part of the town was destroyed by fire, and in December 1534 it was stormed and plundered by the king's troops after a peasants' revolt known as the Count's Feud led by Skipper Clement. This caused the death of up to 2,000 people. The Reformation in 1536 brought about the demolition of the town's two monasteries. As a result of the Reformation, Aalborg became a Lutheran bishopric in 1554.

=== 16th to 19th centuries ===
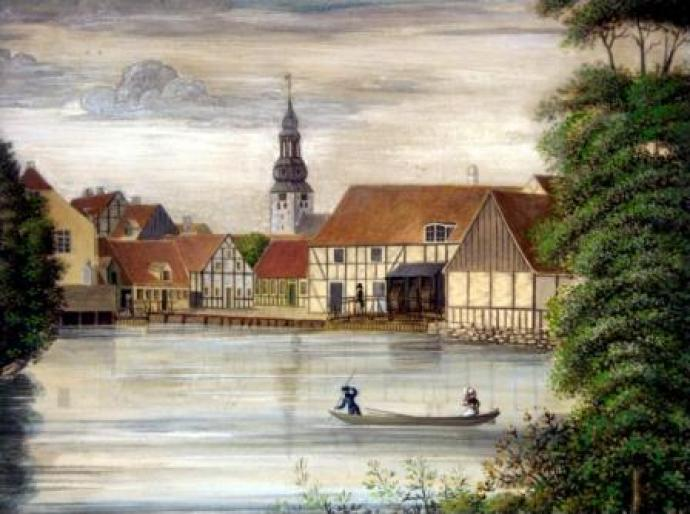
Aalborg in the 1830s: painting of the old watermill by wine merchant Bock showing the mill pond fed from the Østerå

From the 1550s to the 1640s, thanks increased foreign trade, Aalborg prospered second only to that of Copenhagen. The population grew and many fine buildings were built thanks to merchant shipping routes from Norway to Portugal. As such, by 1644, despite previous occupation by imperial forces from 1627 to 1629, Aalborg was a prosperous town with 3,000 to 5,000 inhabitants and a harbor providing access to the Kattegat, Norway, the Limfjord countryside, and Vendsyssel. In 1663, the city suffered another serious fire, which destroyed the tower of Budolfi Church.

During the second half of the 18th century, Aalborg entered a further period of prosperity. In Erik Pontoppidan's Danske Atlas (Danish Atlas) it was described as "after Copenhagen, the best and most prosperous market town in Denmark". In 1767, Denmark's second appeared in Aalborg. The population grew from 4,160 in 1769 to 5,579 in 1801.

After Denmark ceded Norway to Sweden in 1814, Aalborg lost its role as the country's centre for Norwegian trade. The herring industry also suffered after as the fish disappeared after the 1825 North Sea storm when the sea breached the Agger Tange (which had linked Thy with the rest of Jutland at the western end of Limfjord). The state bankruptcy in 1813 also contributed to widespread poverty in the city. In the mid-19th century, Aalborg was overtaken by Aarhus as the largest city in Jutland. An upturn came after the pontoon bridge over Limfjord was completed in 1865, the railway reached the city in 1869 and a railway bridge over the sound to Vendsyssel in 1872. The harbour facilities were also improved, making Aalborg Denmark's second port. Aalborg became the country's main producer of tobacco products and spirits, followed in the 1890s by fertilisers and cement. By 1901, the population had increased to almost 31,500.

=== 20th century industrialisation ===
Around the start of the 20th century, as a result of decisions taken by the municipality, many of the city's half-timbered houses were torn down. They were replaced by hundreds of modern buildings, completely changing the look of the city. Factories with smoking chimneys became ever more prevalent in the outskirts. Among the most important were De Danske Spritfabrikker (spirits and liquors), De forenede Textilfabrikker (textiles), the East Asiatic Company (trading), Dansk Eternit (building materials) and C.W. Obel's tobacco factory (established in 1787). Aalborg Portland, run by F.L. Smidth, was one of several cement factories operating in 1913, together employing some 800 workers. By the 1930s, Aalborg was being promoted as "Denmark's new centre for industry and workers". Replanning continued with additional thoroughfares cutting through the city. The port facilities were also improved with the help of a dredger and the opening of new docks. In 1933, Christian X inaugurated a new bridge over Limfjord to replace the fragile pontoon crossing.

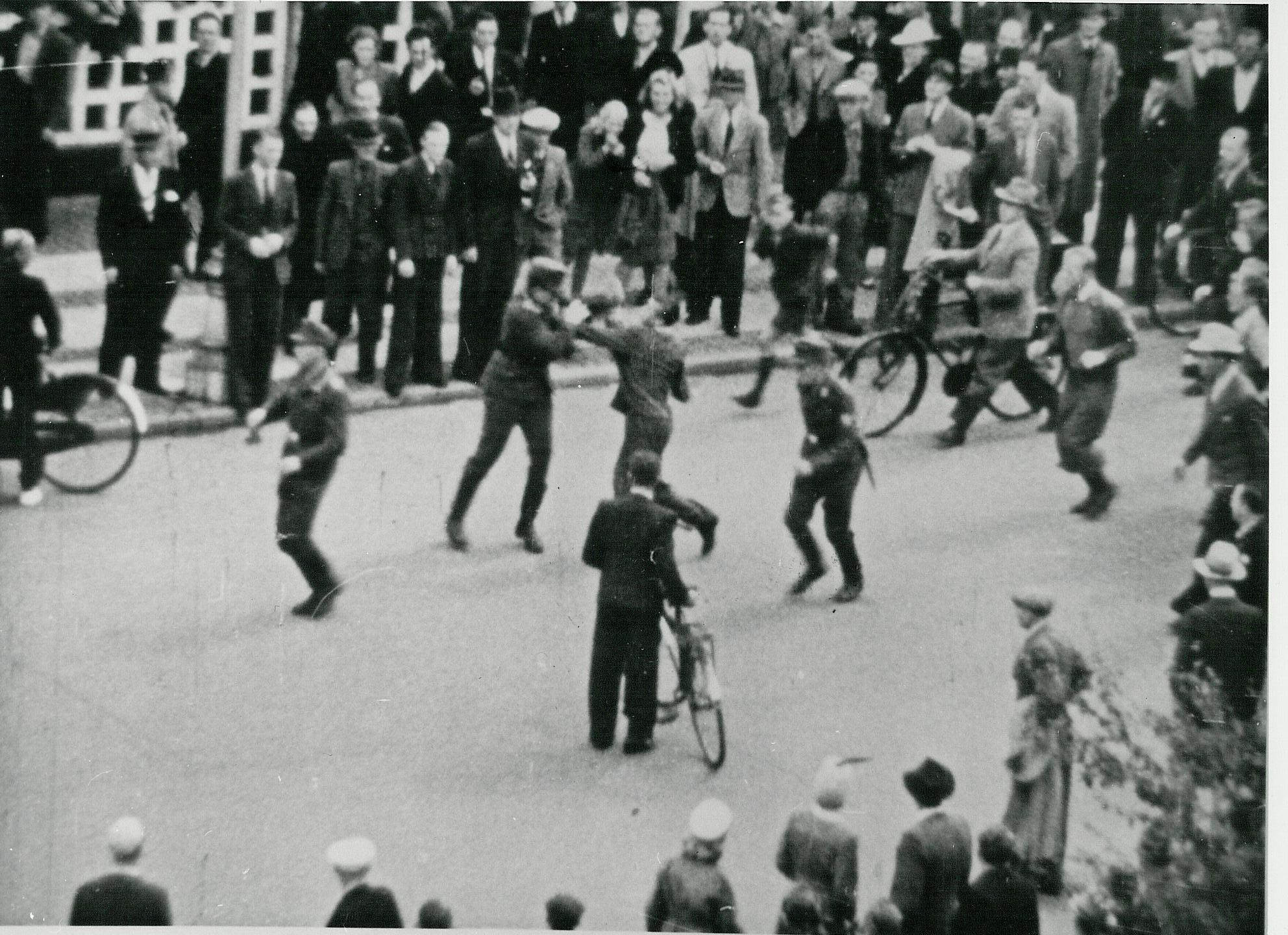
German soldiers in conflict with Aalborg citizens (August 1943)

Aalborg Airport, officially opened in 1938 because of the success of the cement industry, had in fact operated flights to Copenhagen since 1936. During the German invasion of Denmark in 1940, the airport was captured by German paratroopers on the night of 21 April as a base for German aircraft flying to Norway. On 13 August 1940, a dozen Bristol Blenheim bombers of No. 82 Squadron RAF were launched against the Luftwaffe airfield during one of the most disastrous Royal Air Force raids of the war. One turned back because of fuel problems, but all of the remaining 11 were shot down by enemy fighters and/or flak batteries within 20 minutes. After the war, the Royal Air Force destroyed all the German facilities including planes, hangars and equipment but left the passenger facilities intact.

By 1960, Aalborg had become known as the "city of smoking chimneys", with half of the inhabitants working in industry or manufacturing. Ten years later, Aalborg's population had grown to around 97,000 inhabitants.

=== Recent history ===
The significance of Aalborg's industry began to decline in the 1970s, precipitating a fall in the city's population until about 1990, when it began to increase again. By the year 2000, the service and education sectors accounted for about 60% of the workforce, partly due to the founding of Aalborg University (AAU) in 1974. Since 1970, Aalborg and the northern suburb of Nørresundby have become a major administrative centre, thanks in part to the offices of the Region Nordjylland established in the east of the city. In addition to large industrial companies including Aalborg Portland, the only cement-producing company in the country, and the building products company Eternit, many small and medium-sized enterprises have been established. The telecommunications and information technology sector has developed with the support of Aalborg University and the North Jutland knowledge park NOVI.

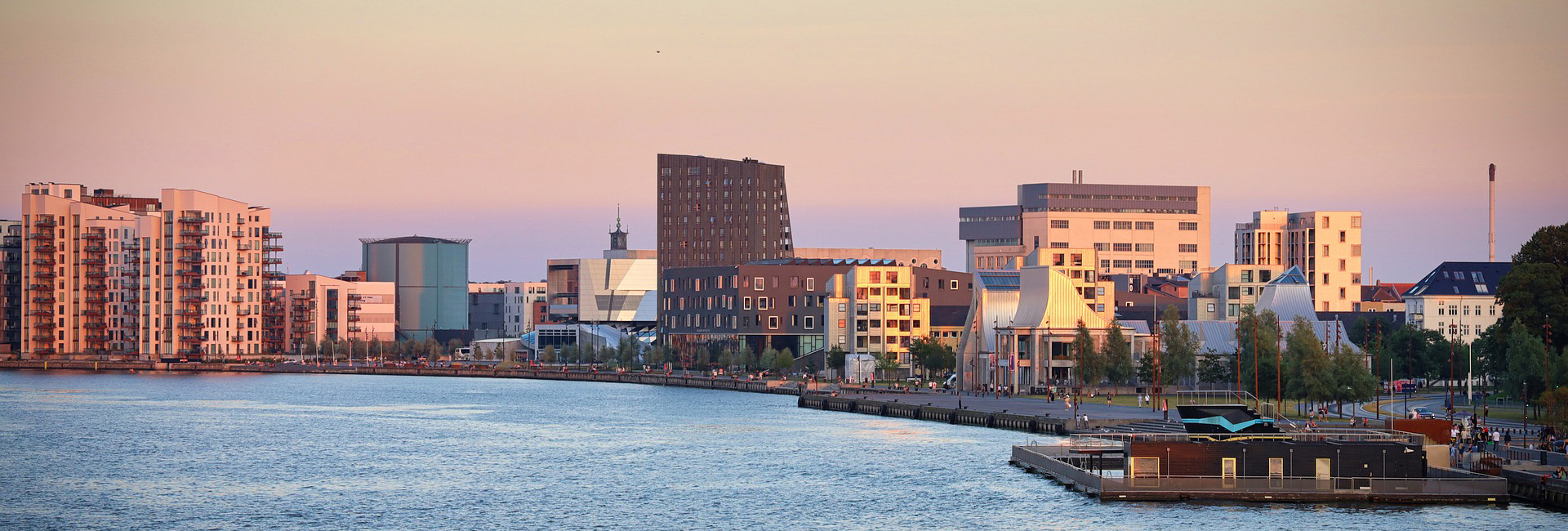
Aalborg Waterfront as seen at sunset (2020).

The First European Conference on Sustainable Cities and Towns took place in Aalborg in 1994. It adopted the Aalborg Charter, which provides a framework for the delivery of local sustainable development and calls on local authorities to engage in Local Agenda 21 processes. The Fourth European Sustainable Cities and Towns Conference, held in Aalborg in 2004, adopted the more binding Aalborg Commitments on local sustainable development. The commitments have now been signed by 650 local authorities while over 2,500 have signed the earlier Aalborg Charter.

On 10 August 2009, a strong tornado hit downtown Aalborg and some eastern districts. The tornado severely damaged the rooves of many buildings, snapped and uprooted trees and tossed caravans over hedges along its 6.6 kilometer path. The European Severe Storms Laboratory (ESSL) rated it F2 on the Fujita scale.

A 2014 survey by the European Commission found that the citizens of Aalborg are the most satisfied people in Europe with their city.

== Geography ==
Aerial view of Aalborg and the Limfjord

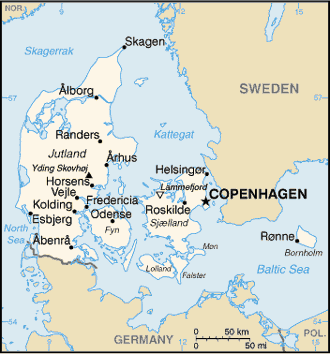
Map showing location (as Ålborg) in Denmark

Aalborg is in North Jutland (northwestern Denmark), at the narrowest point of the Limfjord, a shallow sound that separates North Jutlandic Island (Vendsyssel-Thy) from the rest of the Jutland Peninsula and connects Aalborg to the Kattegat about 35 kilometres (22 mi) to the east. Aalborg is 118 km (73 mi) north of Aarhus, 82 km (51 mi) north of Randers, and 64 km (40 mi) southwest of Frederikshavn. It is 414 km (257 mi) by Great Belt Fixed Link to Copenhagen, 150 km (93 mi) by the Frederikshavn-Göteborg ferry to Gothenburg in Sweden, and 363 km (226 mi) by the Frederikshavn-Oslo ferry to Oslo in Norway.

The area close to the waterfront is low-lying, with an elevation averaging about 5 metres (16 ft), but there are many hills in and around city, some reaching over 60 m (200 ft). Nørresundby, on the northern side of the sound, is also a hilly area. Villages to the south of Aalborg from west to east include Frejlev, Svenstrup, and Gistrup (which contains extensive woodland to the south as well as a golf club). Klarup and Storvorde lie to the southeast along the 595 road, which, flanking a stretch of the Limfjord known as Langerak, leads to the town of Hals. Nibe, with a harbour on the Limfjord, is 21 kilometres (13 mi) to the southwest, past the village of Frejlev. The Nibe Broads (Nibe Bredning) in the Limfjord not only has the largest eelgrass belts in Danish waters but is an important sanctuary for thousands of migratory birds. To the north of the city, villages include Vadum, Aabybro, Vestbjerg, Sulsted, Tylstrup, Vodskov, and Hjallerup. There is an extensive plantation, Branths Plantage - Møgelbjerg, immediately north of Vodskov.

The Himmerland region to the south still has a number of moors which once formed a vast area of heathland extending 35 km (22 mi) to the Rold Forest near Arden. Rebild Hills in the Rold Forest stretch over 425 acres (172 ha) of rolling heath country about 30 kilometres (19 mi) south of Aalborg. Lille Vildmose, to the southeast, is reported to be the largest raised bog in north-western Europe.

=== The city ===
The city centre, dating from the Middle Ages, lies on a series of clay banks between the former streams of Vesterå and Lilleå, which used to run into the sound. Despite effective drainage, the main streets, including Algade, still run east to west while the side streets run north to south. The Budolfi Church and the old town hall line Gammeltorv, the old market square. The main shopping streets are Algade and Bispengade, the latter lying in between the modern Vesterbro thoroughfare and Nytorv square. Østerågade, once the old harbor, is noted for its merchants' mansions.

The city cemetery, the Kilden park and the modern art museum, Kunsten, are in the modern commercial and administrative area around the railway station to the west. Beyond this, Hasseris has become a residential district with a number of large villas and detached houses. The city's main development area is now to the east of the centre although in addition to the university and new areas of housing, it still contains the shipping harbor, Østhavnen, and the cement factory. The waterfront to the northeast of the centre is being transformed from a harbour into a recreational area with the Utzon Center and Musikkens Hus.

=== Egholm ===
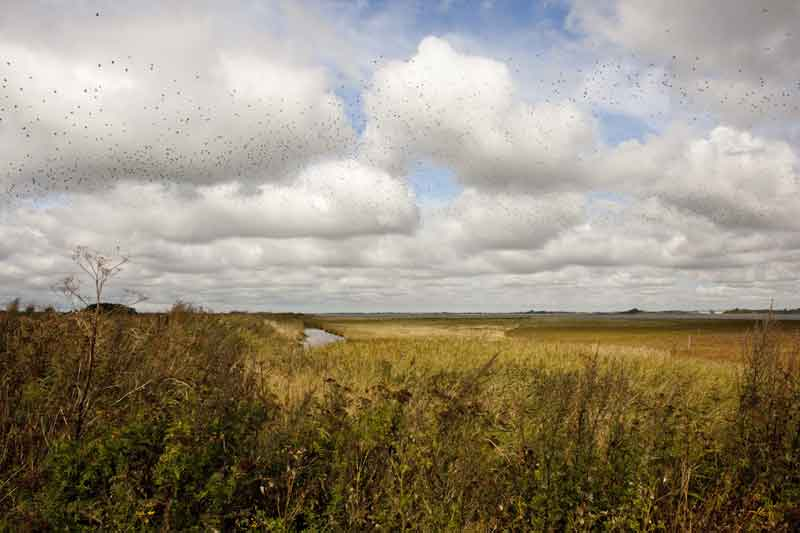
Egholm

Off the northwestern side of the city in the sound is the island of Egholm, reached via ferry. The island, with a population of 51 as of 2023, covers an area of 6.05 square kilometres (2.34 sq mi) and consists mainly of farmland although there are still a few untilled areas of salt marshes and woodland. Dikes have been built along the coastline to protect the island from flooding. The Kronborg Forest on the island, covering an area of 17 hectares (42 acres), was acquired by the municipal government in 1945. A restaurant in the vicinity was established in 1918 but rebuilt in 1946 following a fire. To the west of Egholm is the smaller uninhabited Fruensholm, and there are also three small islands to the north.

=== Lakes and chalk deposits ===
There are several man-made lakes nearby: Lindholm Kridtgrav lies to the northwest of Skanse Park on the northern side of Limfjord, while Nordens Kridtgrav to the northwest of Mølleparken is on the southern side. The Aalborg area is one of three in Denmark where chalk deposits are found (the others being Møns Klint and Stevns). The largest quarry is at Rørdal in Øster Sundby (6 km (4 mi) to the east of the city centre), while Vokslev (20 km (12 mi) to the west) has also provided chalk. Clay is also quarried in Østerådalen in the southern outskirts, making the area ideal for cement production.

=== Parks and green spaces ===
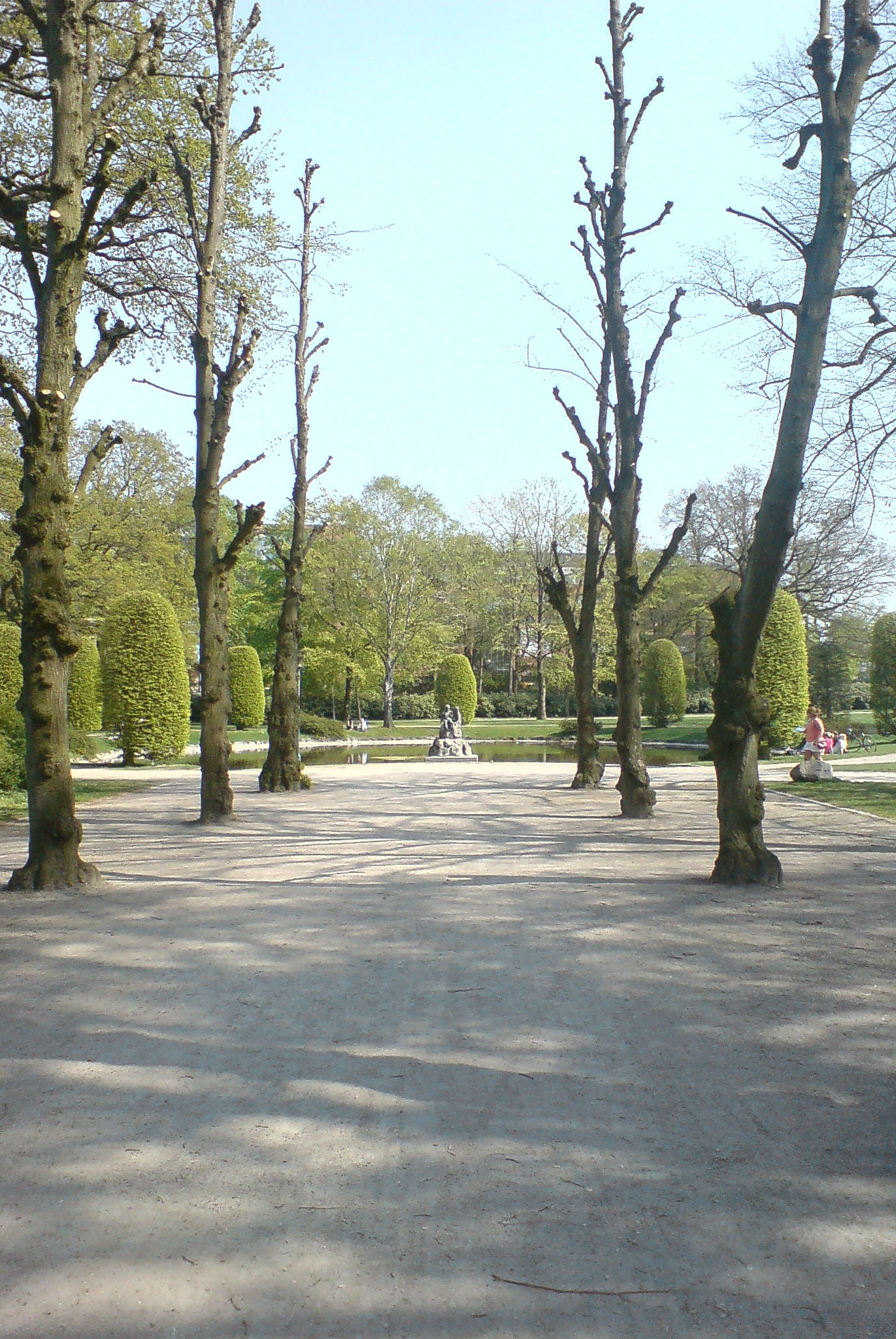
Kildeparken

The 6.5 hectares (16 acres) Østre Anlæg park is one of the oldest in Aalborg, visited by up to 175,000 people a year. It was used as a dumping ground in the 1920s before being cleaned up and made into a recreational area in the 1930s and 1940s. It contains lawns, flowers, tall trees, bushes, and a lake, overlooked by St. Mark's Church on the eastern side. The lake is on the site of a former clay pit. Fifty-one species of bird have been recorded in the park.

Lindholm Fjordpark, to the south of the Lindholm's industrial park, forms part of the green sector of the city known as 'Ryåkilen' along the coast of the sound, covering roughly 50 hectares (120 acres). Like Østre Anlæg, it once served as a waste site with landfill, and a housing estate was built on its northeastern side. Its use as a landfill site was gradually discontinued in the 1990s, and in 1996, extensive restoration work began. Today it has woodlands and open areas with grass and herbaceous vegetation, notably buckthorn. It is also a habitat for many species of migratory birds such as pale-bellied brent geese, curlews, and songbirds. The park is also used by the Nordjysk Windsurfing Club and has a six-hole golf course.

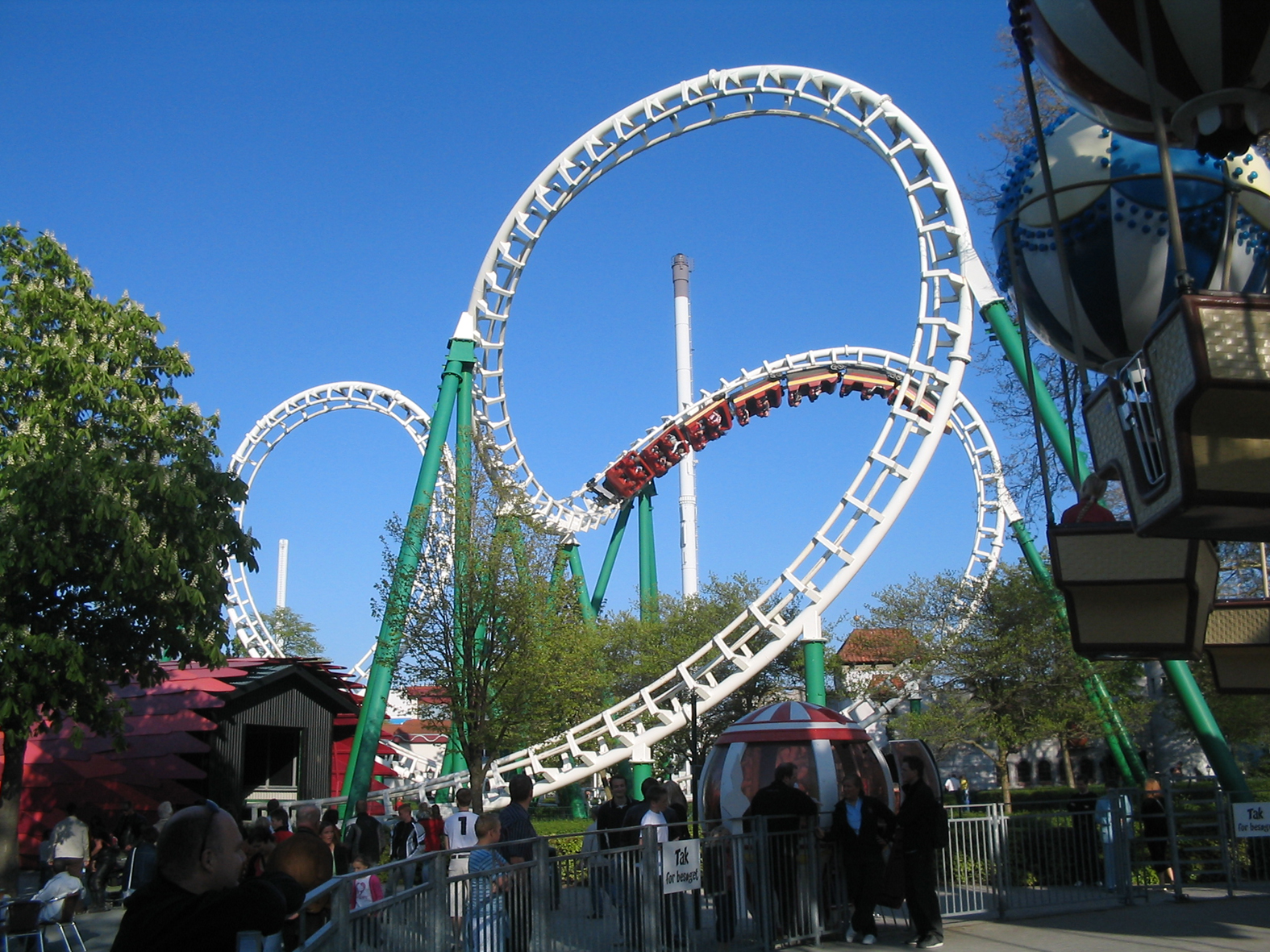
A rollercoaster at Karolinelund

Aalborg has a number of additional civic parks and recreational facilities. Among them are Kildeparken, which hosts the annual Aalborg Carnival, Mølleparken, which contains a pond, statues, an outdoor exercise facility, and a 2.5 kilometre (1.6 mi) jogging trail (within the trail lies the Lysløjpen, a 45-metre [148 ft] gradient), Sohngårdsholmpark, a wooded area containing trails for both walking/jogging and biking and a six-hole golf course (free to the public), the Aalborg Open Air Swimming Pool, also free to the public, Bundgårdsparken, and Lindholm Strandpark.

The Aalborg Zoo opened in 1935 and typically houses 1,300 animals of 138 species, including tigers, chimpanzees, zebra, elephants, giraffes, penguins and polar bears. It is one of the area's major tourist attractions with over 300,000 visitors a year. Within the zoo an African savannah has been created where exotic animals are housed.

Aalborg was home to an amusement park, Karolinelund, founded in 1946. In 2005, the founding family sold it to an entrepreneur who resold it to the city the following year. When the park closed in 2010, it had 17 attractions. Recently, the city reopened the park to volunteers who wish to return it to operating status. It is now open to the public for leisure without rides and attractions. It houses Platform4, a non-profit user-driven project-oriented venue that experiments with electronics in combination with artistic genres. Volunteers often arrange public seminars, exhibitions, films, music concerts, and more which.

=== Climate ===
Aalborg has a maritime climate (Cfb), just above the humid continental climate classification (Dfb) with short, mild summers and long, moderately cold winters.

Climate data for Aalborg (Aalborg Airport) (1991–2020 normals, extremes 1971–2000)
Month	Jan	Feb	Mar	Apr	May	Jun	Jul	Aug	Sep	Oct	Nov	Dec	Year
Record high °C (°F)	10.5 (50.9)	11.5 (52.7)	18.8 (65.8)	25.5 (77.9)	27.5 (81.5)	30.9 (87.6)	32.1 (89.8)	34.4 (93.9)	27.8 (82.0)	22.3 (72.1)	15.2 (59.4)	12.3 (54.1)	35.1 (95.2)
Mean daily maximum °C (°F)	3.4 (38.1)	3.6 (38.5)	6.4 (43.5)	11.5 (52.7)	15.6 (60.1)	18.7 (65.7)	21.1 (70.0)	20.8 (69.4)	17.0 (62.6)	12.0 (53.6)	7.5 (45.5)	4.5 (40.1)	11.8 (53.3)
Daily mean °C (°F)	1.2 (34.2)	1.4 (34.5)	3.3 (37.9)	7.6 (45.7)	11.4 (52.5)	14.8 (58.6)	17.1 (62.8)	16.9 (62.4)	13.5 (56.3)	9.2 (48.6)	5.2 (41.4)	2.3 (36.1)	8.7 (47.6)
Mean daily minimum °C (°F)	−1.1 (30.0)	−0.9 (30.4)	0.2 (32.4)	3.7 (38.7)	7.2 (45.0)	10.8 (51.4)	13.2 (55.8)	12.9 (55.2)	10.0 (50.0)	6.3 (43.3)	2.9 (37.2)	0.1 (32.2)	4.2 (39.6)
Record low °C (°F)	−25.2 (−13.4)	−19.4 (−2.9)	−25.6 (−14.1)	−8.1 (17.4)	−2.1 (28.2)	2.0 (35.6)	4.2 (39.6)	3.7 (38.7)	−2.3 (27.9)	−5.8 (21.6)	−16.4 (2.5)	−23.0 (−9.4)	−25.6 (−14.1)
Average precipitation mm (inches)	45.8 (1.80)	29.6 (1.17)	37.8 (1.49)	30.8 (1.21)	42.3 (1.67)	55.5 (2.19)	51.4 (2.02)	58.1 (2.29)	71.3 (2.81)	66.4 (2.61)	56.3 (2.22)	52.8 (2.08)	600.1 (23.63)
Average precipitation days (≥ 1.0 mm)	10.9	7.5	9.6	7.2	7.5	8.4	7.6	9.0	11.1	11.3	12.2	11.6	114.4
Average snowy days	7.0	5.2	4.3	1.3	0.0	0.0	0.0	0.0	0.0	0.1	2.0	4.8	24.6
Average relative humidity (%)	88.8	87.1	82.2	76.3	74.7	76.5	76.7	78.9	82.6	85.6	88.3	90.1	81
Source 1: Danish Meteorological Institute (precipitation, sun and snow 1971–2000)
Source 2: IEM

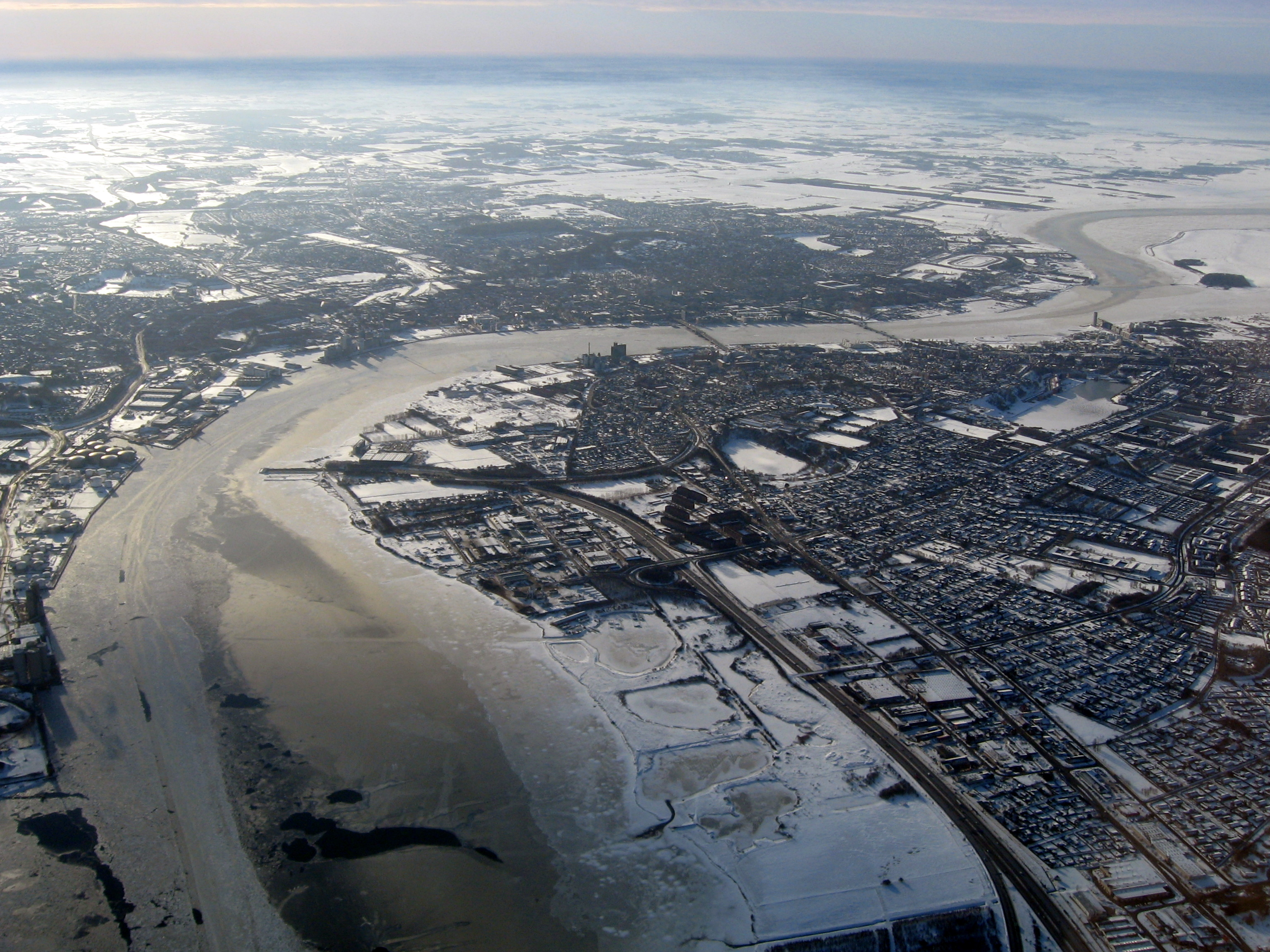
Aalborg during winter

Aalborg is cool most of the year, with average high temperatures of around 20 °C (68 °F) and lows of 11 °C (52 °F) during the summer, and average temperatures of −3 to 2 °C (27 to 36 °F) during the coldest months of January and February, rarely dropping below −15 °C (5 °F). The warmest months are typically July and August, with an average temperature of 16 °C (61 °F), but by October the temperature averages 9 °C (48 °F). June has the highest number of hours of sunshine on average at 218, closely followed by May and July. Precipitation is rather evenly distributed all year around, with an average of 76 mm (3 in) during October, normally the wettest month with an average 14 days with rainfall, and an average of 35 mm (1 in) during February, normally the driest month with an average of eight days of precipitation, closely followed by April.

== Politics and government ==
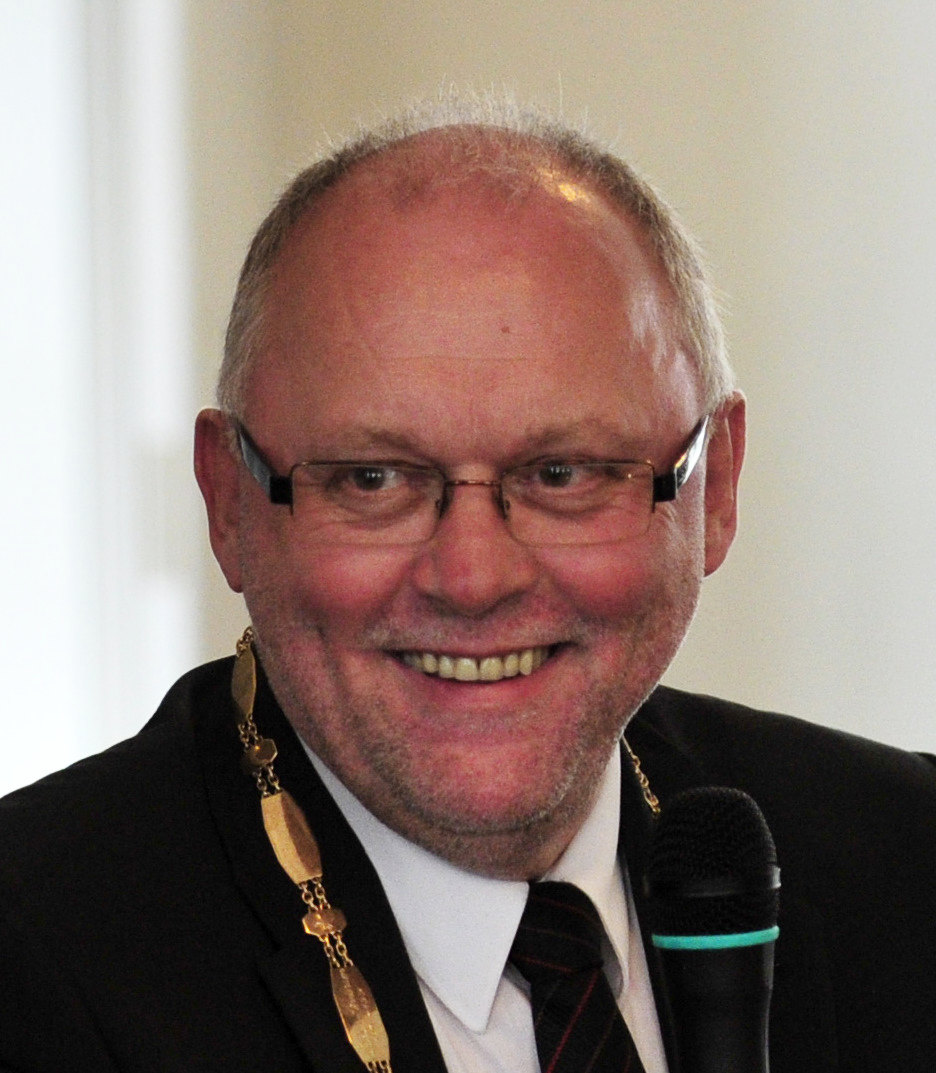
Former Mayor Henning G. Jensen, in May 2010

Henning G. Jensen, a Social Democrat, was the long-serving Mayor of Aalborg from 1998 until 2013. He was succeeded by Thomas Kastrup-Larsen, also a Social Democrat, who was elected to the City Council in 1998.

The current mayor is Lasse Frimand Jensen from the Social Democratic Party who was elected on 19 June 2023.

The civic government in Aalborg consists of seven departments: the Mayor's Department (responsible for the titular position, the four Citizen Service Centres in Aalborg, the Financial Services division, the Commercial Services division, the General Services division, and the Fire and Rescue Centre); the Technical and Environmental Department (responsible for urban planning, transportation oversight, the Parks and Nature division, and the Environmental Division); the Department of Family and Employment (responsible for Children and Family services, social services, and the city's "Job Centre"); the Department of Care of the Elderly and Disabled (responsible for social benefits, senior citizen care, and disabled citizen care); the Department of Education and Cultural Affairs (responsible for the municipal schools, the public libraries, the Cultural Affairs division, and the city archives); the Health and Sustainable Development Department (responsible for public health, the Occupational Health and Safety Division, the Public Transportation division, and the Sustainable Development division); and the Utilities Department (responsible for gas, heating, water, sewage, and refuse collection).

Aalborg City Council consists of 31 members, including a mayor. As of September 2013, 11 of the council seats are held by the Social Democratic Party, nine by Venstre, three by the Socialist People's Party, two by the Danish People's Party, and two by the Conservative People's Party, while three members are professed independents. The council is mandated to hold a minimum of two meetings per month, with meetings of a public forum format.

== Demographics ==
Historical population
Year	Pop.	±%
1672	4,181	—
1787	4,866	+16.4%
1801	5,579	+14.7%
1834	7,048	+26.3%
1845	7,477	+6.1%
1860	10,069	+34.7%
1870	11,721	+16.4%
1880	14,152	+20.7%
1890	19,503	+37.8%
1901	31,457	+61.3%
1911	38,415	+22.1%
1921	48,239	+25.6%
1930	59,091	+22.5%
1940	74,681	+26.4%
1950	87,883	+17.7%
1960	96,436	+9.7%
1970	100,587	+4.3%
1976	94,994	−5.6%
1981	114,302	+20.3%
1986	113,650	−0.6%
1990	113,599	−0.0%
1994	116,567	+2.6%
1998	119,157	+2.2%
2002	120,359	+1.0%
2006	121,540	+1.0%
2010	123,432	+1.6%
2012	126,556	+2.5%
2013	106,916	−15.5%
2014	130,853	+22.4%
2018	137,053	+4.7%
2022	119,862	−12.5%
Source: Official Danish census data

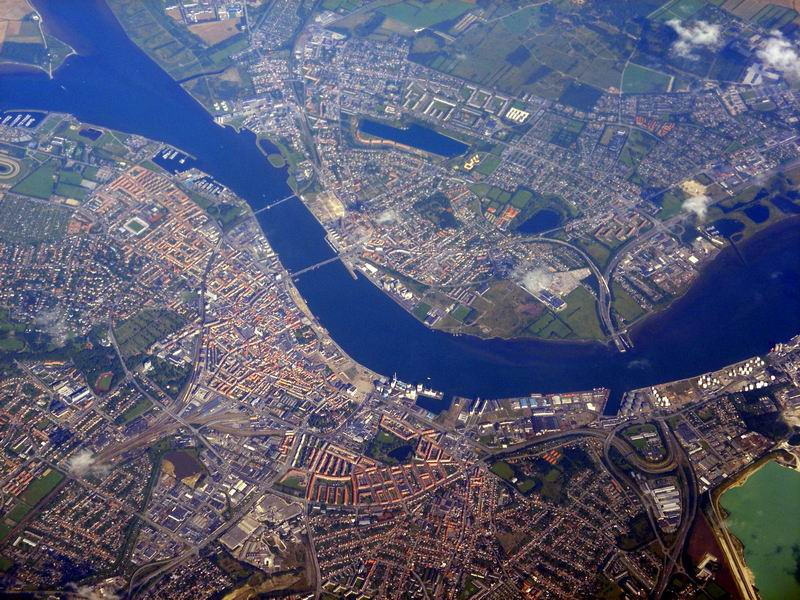
Aalborg and its satellite town, Nørresundby (situated to the north), seen from the satellite.

Aalborg was the largest town in Jutland until it was surpassed by Aarhus in the mid-19th century. In 1672, it had 4,181 inhabitants, growing slowly during the 18th century, with 4,425 in 1769, 4,866 in 1787 and 5,579 by 1801. By 1845, there were 7,477 inhabitants, increasing to 10,069 by 1860. Dramatic growth began in the late 19th century, with an increase from 14,152 in 1880 to 31,457 in 1901. By 1930, the population had grown to 59,091, although the figure was boosted by the merging of Nørre Tranders, Rørdal Fabriksby, Øster Sundby, and Øster Uttrup into Aalborg.

In 1950, it reached 87,883, which grew to 100,587 by 1970. There was a temporary decline in population to 94,994 in 1976 but in 1981, following the incorporation of Nørresundby, it grew to 114,302. The population has increased steadily since then; according to the census of 1 January 2009, Aalborg had a total of 122,461 inhabitants.

As of 2021, the town had a total population of 142,561 (118,871 in the city proper and 23,690 in Nørresundby) making it the fourth most populous in Denmark after Copenhagen, Aarhus, and Odense. Statistics for 2016 showed there were 210,316 people living in the Municipality of Aalborg.

== Economy ==
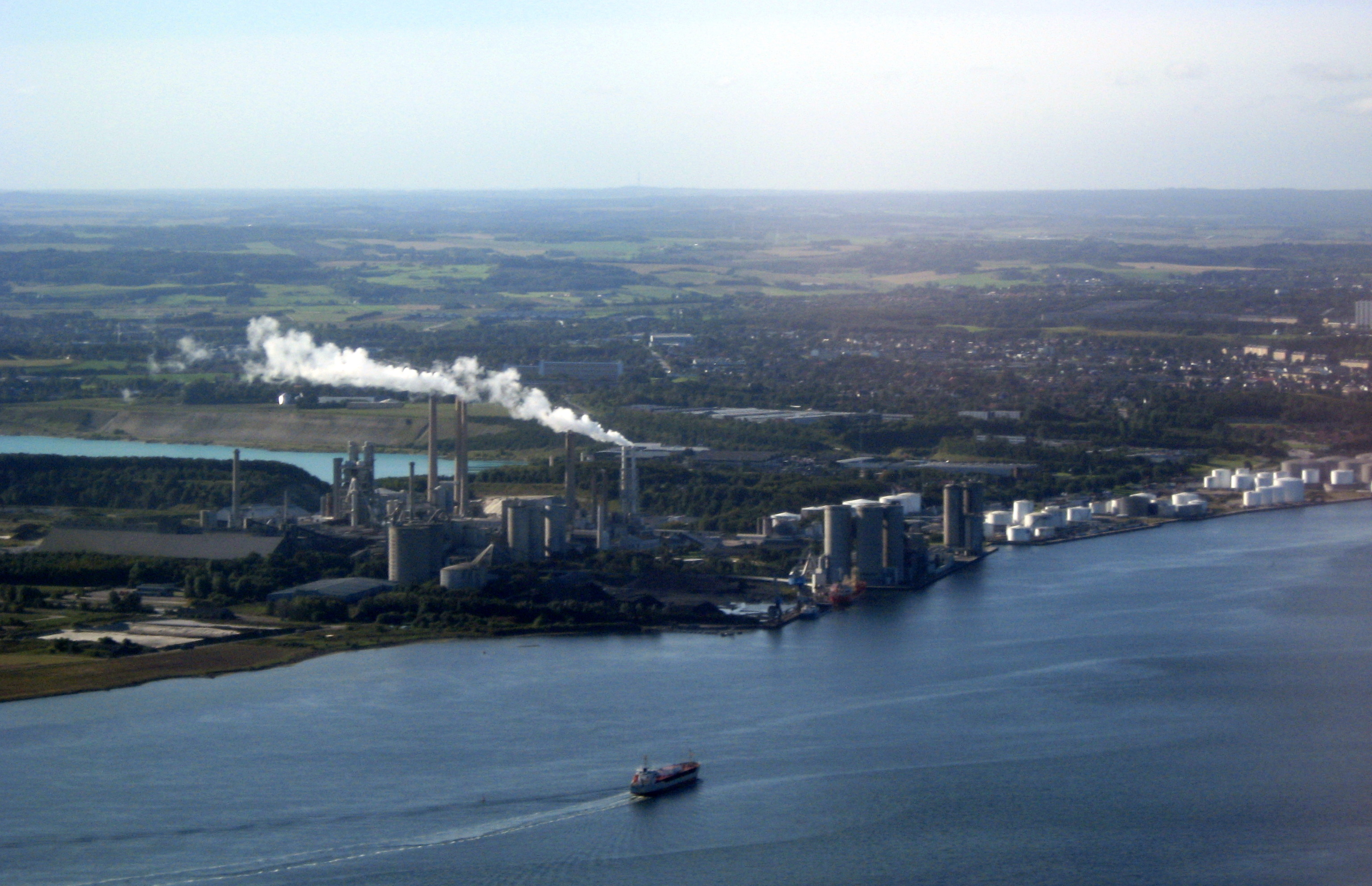
Industry in Aalborg on the Limfjord

Aalborg is North Jutland's major industrial and commercial centre, exporting grain, cement, and spirits. Heavy industry was behind the city's prosperity until fairly recently. Many of the factories have now closed, to be replaced by developments in the knowledge-based and green-energy sectors. Mobile and wireless communications industries have grown substantially since the 1990s, when the area became known as "Mobilicon Valley". Aalborg is now a major producer of rotors for wind turbines, and in 2021, Siemens Gamesa Renewable Energy produced six of the world's first reusable offshore wind turbine blades at its factory in Østhavnen.

In January 2011, there were some 9,200 enterprises in Aalborg, employing around 109,000 people or approximately 35% of the workforce of the Northern Region. In the 2010s, the city is set on increasing its participation in the global economy through both existing companies and new entrants. Its efforts are focused on four areas: energy and environment, information technology, health support systems and "Arctic business". The latter covers trade with Greenland as the Port of Aalborg handles over 60% of all goods shipped to Greenland. Four harbours dot the waterfront, Marina Fjordparken, Skudehavnen, Vestre Badehavn, and Østre Havn. Tourism is also growing, with a considerable rise in the number of passengers at Aalborg Airport. Aalborg Municipality has Denmark's second highest revenue from tourism and is the only municipality in the north of Denmark where overnight stays are increasing.

=== Major private companies ===
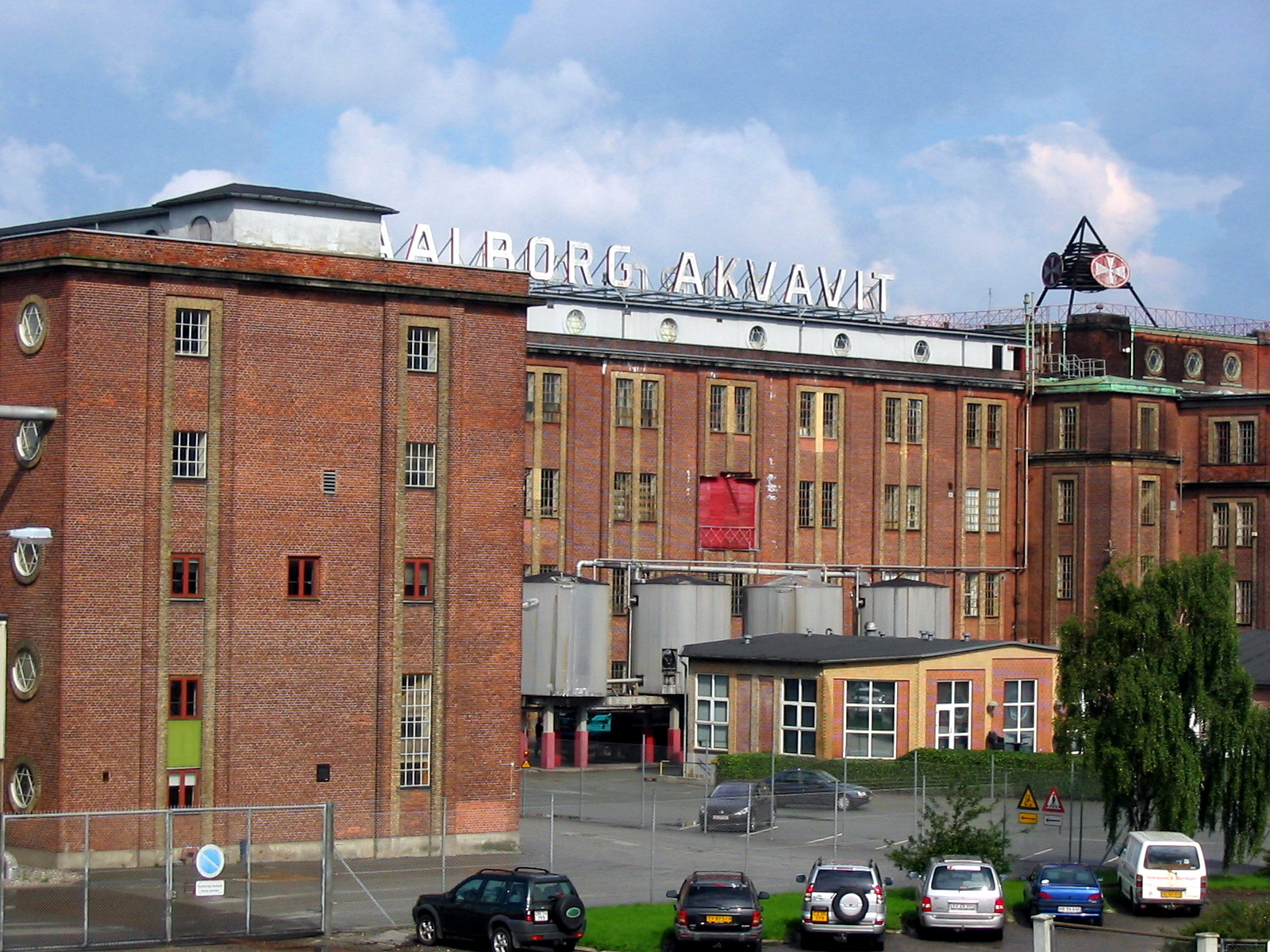
Akvavit was a major export.

Telenor Denmark, part of the Norwegian Telenor telecommunications and mobile phone company, has a workforce of about 1,100 in Aalborg, making it one of the city's largest new employers. Siemens Wind Power has rotor-blade production and testing facilities in Aalborg. In 2012 and 2013, there were additions in both areas. The new testing plant is the world's largest research test centre for wind turbine technology. In 2012, the company shipped a record 570 wind turbine blades from the Port of Aalborg, mainly to England and Ireland, up 45% on the previous year.

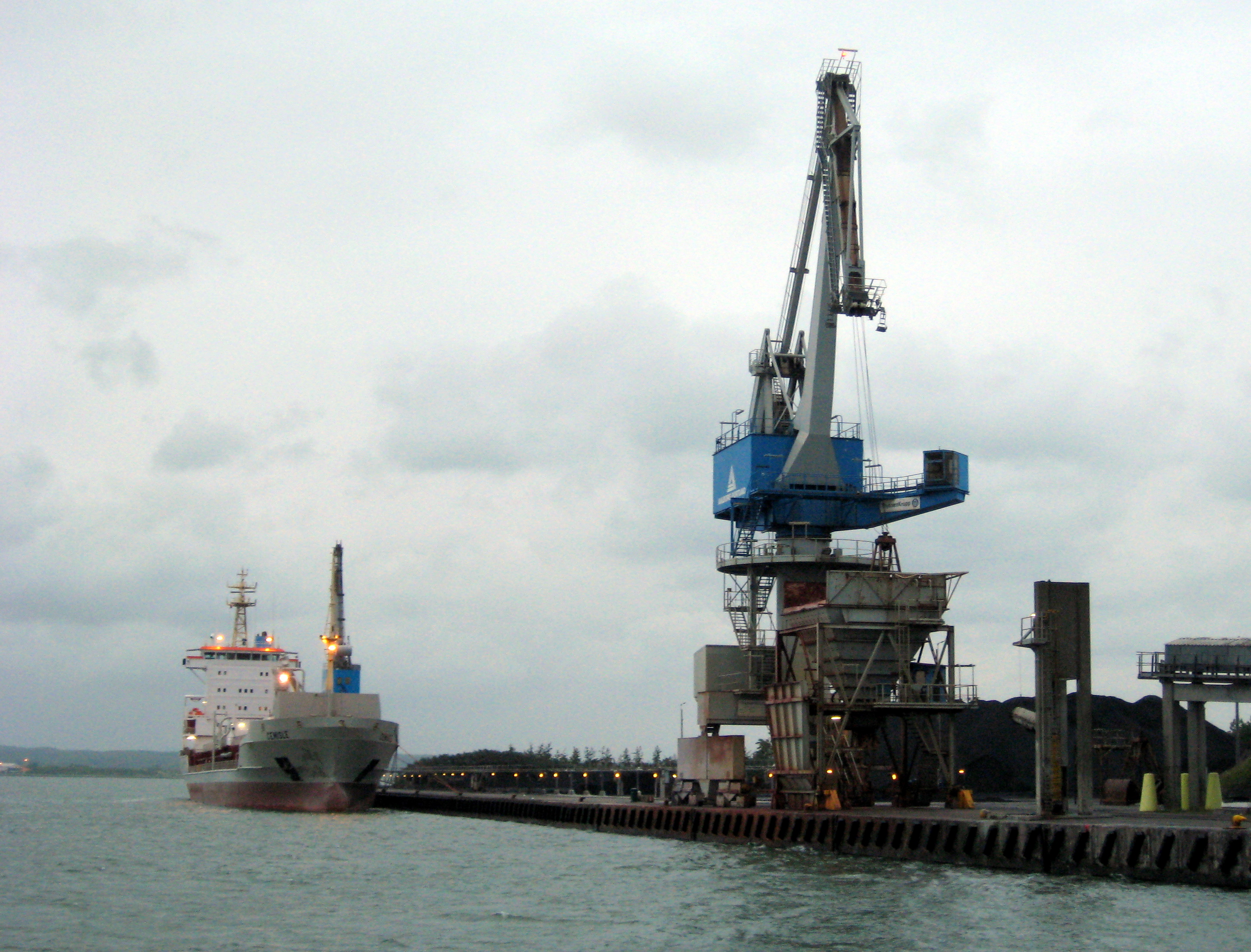
The cement-carrier Cemisle at Aalborg Portland

Aalborg was home to De Danske Spritfabrikker or Danish Distillers (now owned by the Norwegian company Arcus), which produces numerous brands of akvavit, until 2014. The company is the world's largest akvavit producer and exporter. Aalborg Industries, the world's largest manufacturer of marine boilers, has been established in Aalborg since the 1920s. It has recently expanded into floating production systems for the offshore market. Employing 2,600 people, in December 2010 it was acquired by the Swedish Alfa Laval, also a specialist in the area. Aalborg Portland, a subsidiary of the Italian Cementir since 2004, was founded in 1889 with the support of FLSmidth. Able to draw on the chalk deposits from Rørdal to the east of the city, it rapidly became a major cement producer. Today it is the world's largest supplier of white cement, which it exports around the globe.

=== Facilities ===
Aalborg has a wide selection of shops and restaurants. In the city centre, there are both large department stores and smaller speciality shops. One of the largest shopping malls in Denmark, the Aalborg Storcenter, is to the south of the city in Skalborg. It has about 75 stores, including a large Bilka supermarket. The city has over 300 restaurants, catering in Danish, European and Asian dishes. Notable establishments include Irish House, a pub in the 17th-century Jens Olufsen's House. While Aalborg is renowned for its alcohol and nightlife, there are also a number of coffee shops.

Aalborg has 12 large hotels, most within walking distance of the city centre. The Helnan Phønix Hotel is the largest, occupying what was originally built as a lavish private residence in 1783 for a Danish brigadier. It was converted into a hotel in 1853. The Chagall was established in the 1950s and has reproductions of Marc Chagall paintings in the rooms. Other hotels include Radisson Blu Limfjord Hotel, Park Hotel, Cabinn Aalborg, Hotel Hvide Hus, Hotel Krogen and Prinsen Hotel. Several banks including Danske Bank, Forex, Jyske Bank, Spar Nord and Nordea have branches in Aalborg.

== Landmarks ==
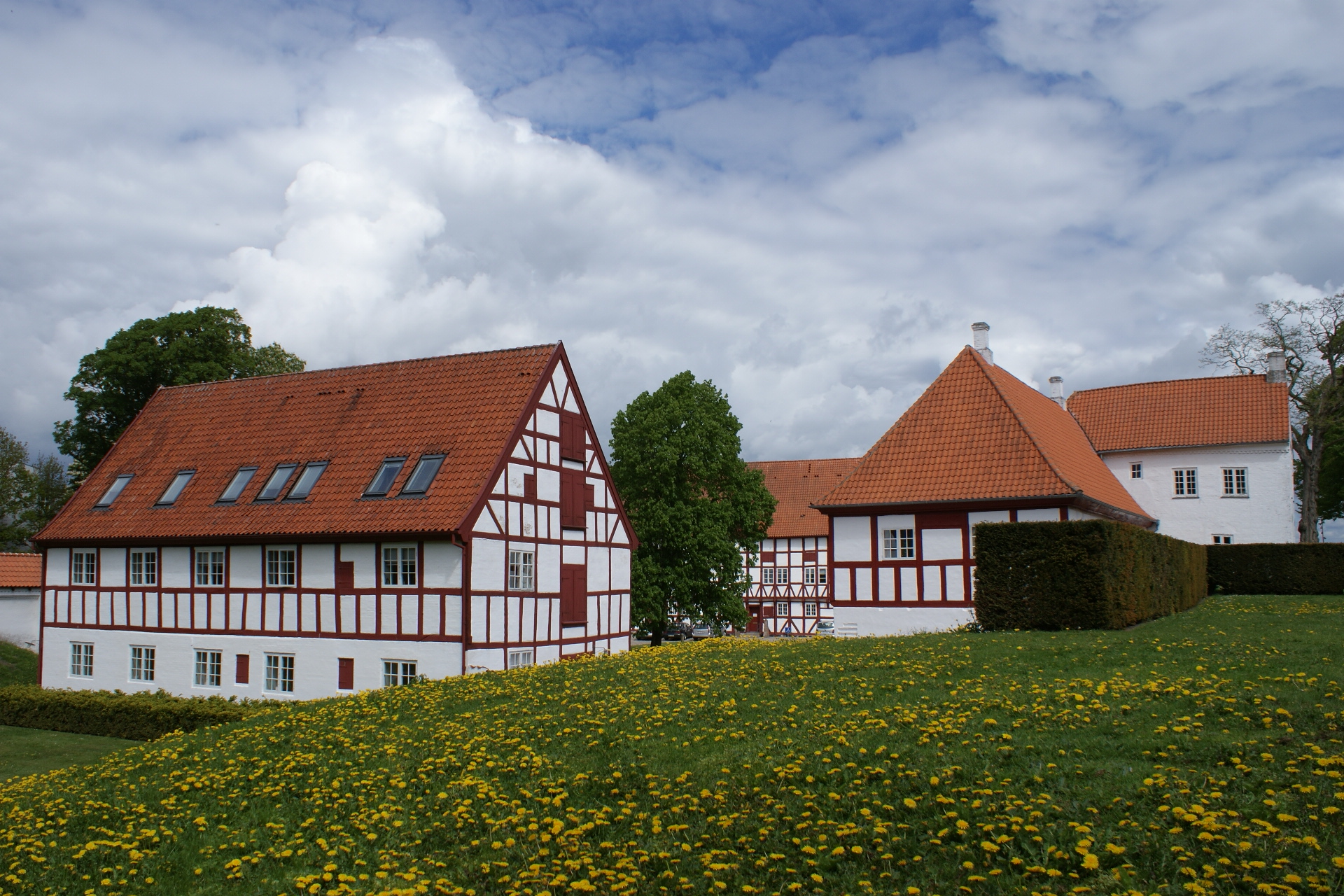
Aalborghus Castle

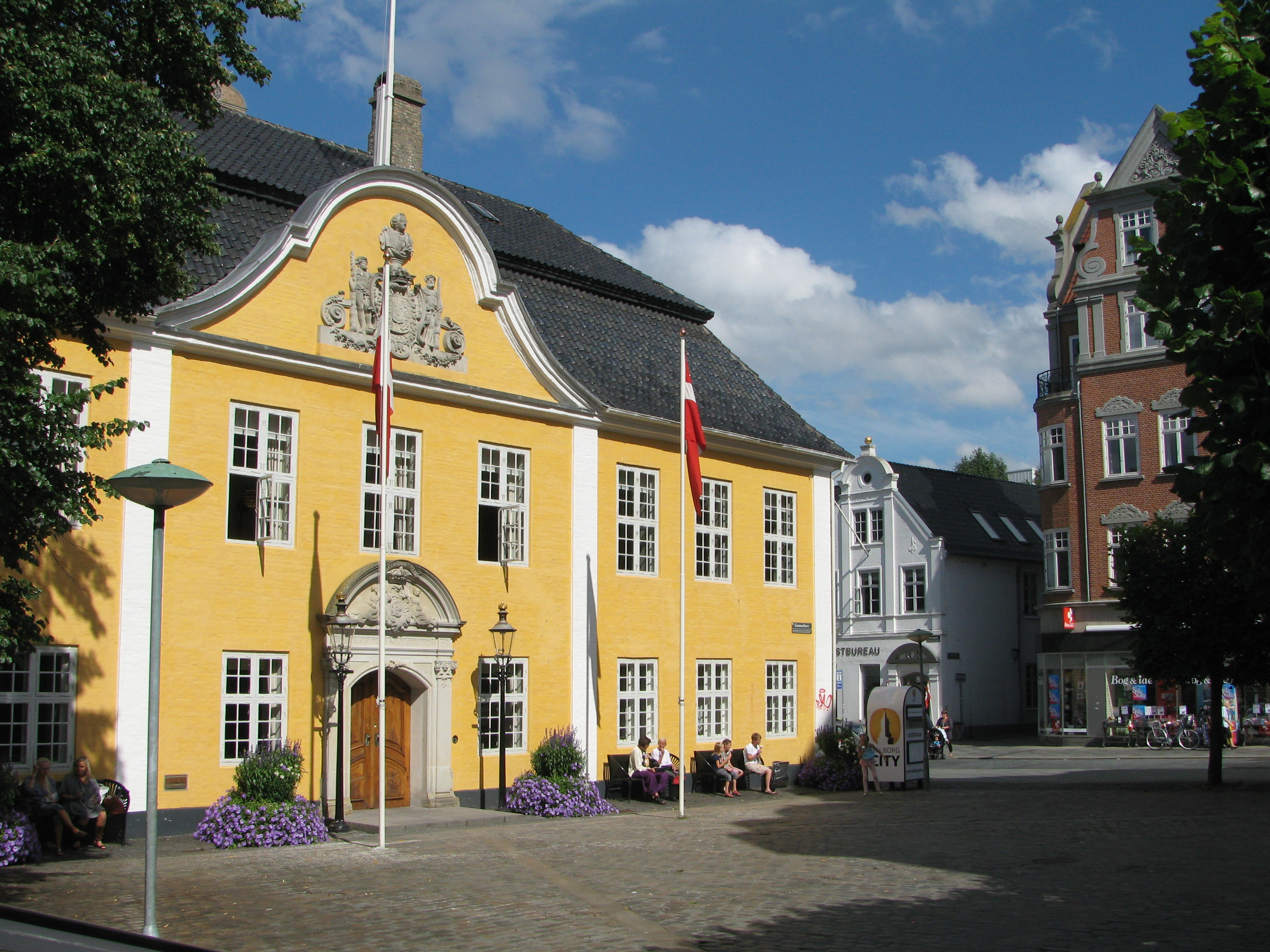
Old/former town hall

Despite its industrial background and the factories along its waterfront, the city has gained popularity for tourism in recent years, offering a wide variety of attractions and historic buildings in addition to its museums, churches and parks.

=== Historic buildings ===
Jens Bang's House (Danish: Jens Bangs Stenhus), on Østerågade near the old town hall, is one of Denmark's best examples of 17th-century domestic architecture. Built in 1624 by the Aalborg merchant Jens Bang in the Dutch Renaissance style, the four-story sandstone building is noted for its rising gables and sculpted auricular window decorations. For over 300 years, it has housed the city's oldest pharmacy.

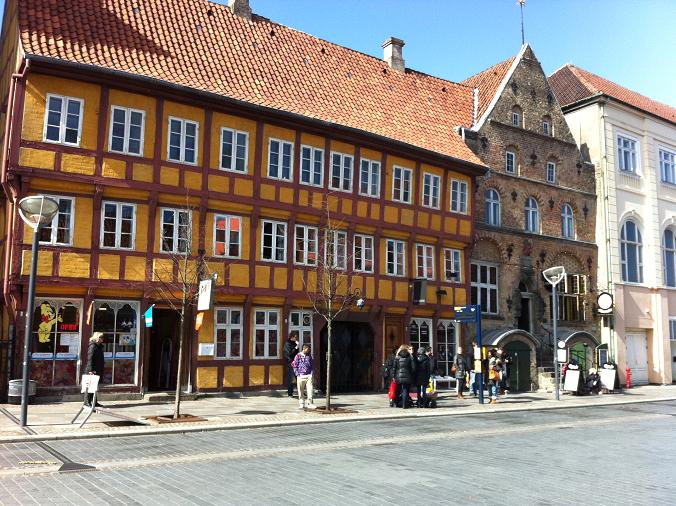
Jørgen Olufsen's House

Jørgen Olufsen's House (Jørgen Olufsens Gård) on Østerågade is Denmark's best preserved merchant's mansion in the Renaissance style. Built mainly of sandstone in 1616, it also has a half-timbered section. The style is reminiscent of similar buildings in the north of Germany and in the Netherlands. Olufsen, Jens Bang's half brother, was a successful merchant and mayor of Aalborg. When it was built, the residence with its integrated warehouse was on the Østerå, an inlet from the sound with access for barges. The old iron bar with a hook for scales can be seen in the portico.

Aalborghus Castle (Aalborghus Slot) is a half-timbered building with red-painted woodwork and whitewashed wall panels. It was built in the mid-16th century by King Christian III for his vassals who collected taxes and is the only remaining example of its kind in the country. The park, dungeon and casemates, but not the castle itself, are open to the public in the summer months. In the 1950s, the castle was converted into administrative offices.

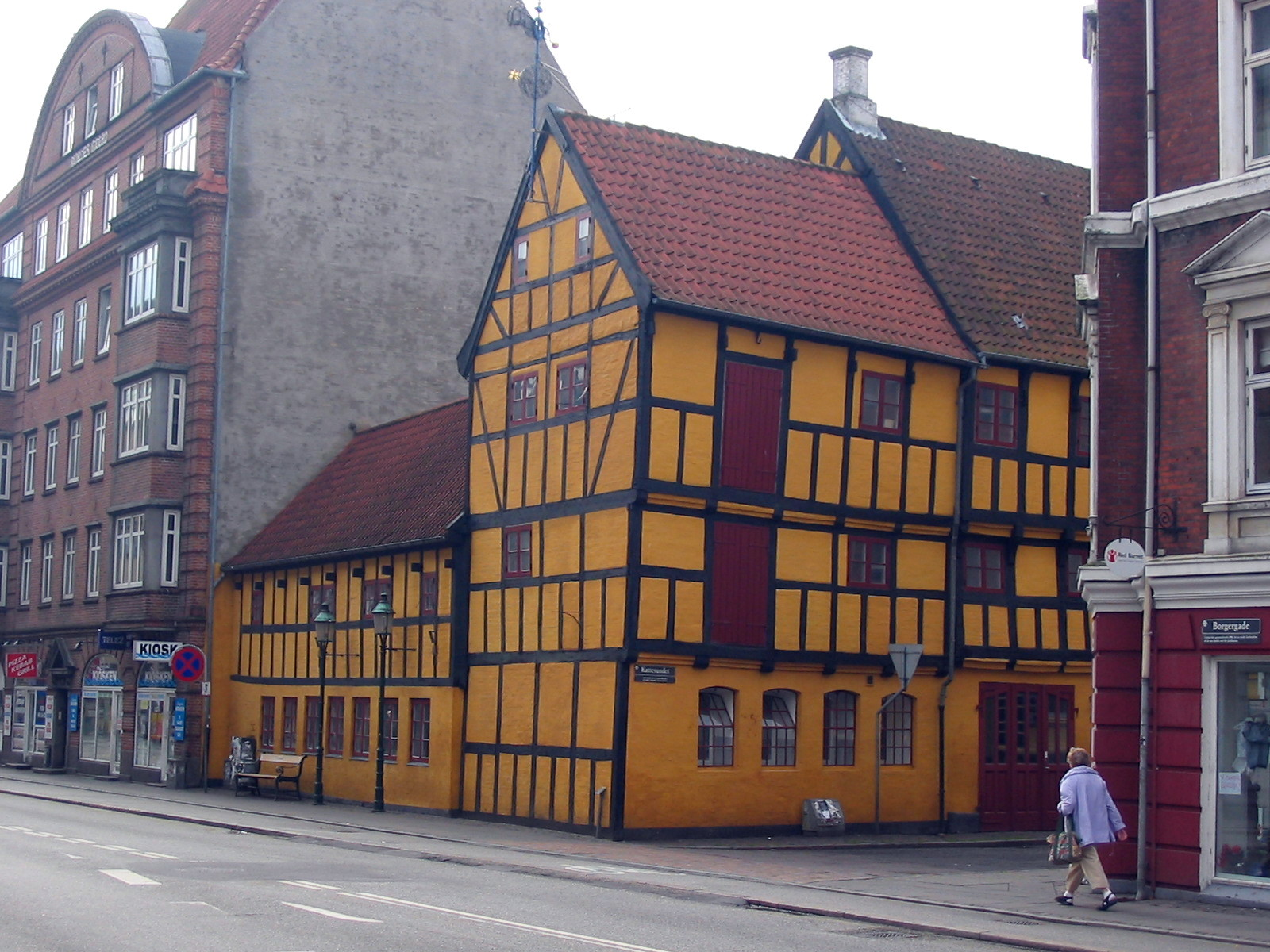
Historical house in Aalborg town centre

Aalborg's old city hall in Gammeltorv, in service until 1912, was built in 1762. It is now only used for ceremonial and representative purposes. Designed in the Late Baroque style, the building with its black-glazed tile roof consists of two storeys and a cellar. The yellow-washed façade is decorated with white pilasters and a frontispiece featuring the Danish coat of arms and a bust of King Frederick V. His motto, Prudentia et Constantia, is also seen above the main entrance. The well-preserved door is an example of the Rococo style. The building was listed by the Danish Heritage Agency in 1918.

Another old building of note is the half-timbered Håndværkerhuset (at Kattesunded 20) from c. 1625, which originally housed a number of warehouses. It is now used as a centre for arts and crafts. Finally, the headquarters of Danish Distillers (De Danske Spritfabrikker), to the west of the Limfjord Bridge, is noted for its Neoclassical appearance. Completed in 1931 by the architect Alf Cock-Clausen, it combines functionality with decorative classical symbolism. Considered a masterpiece of Danish factory design, it is now a Danish National Heritage site.

=== Other landmarks ===
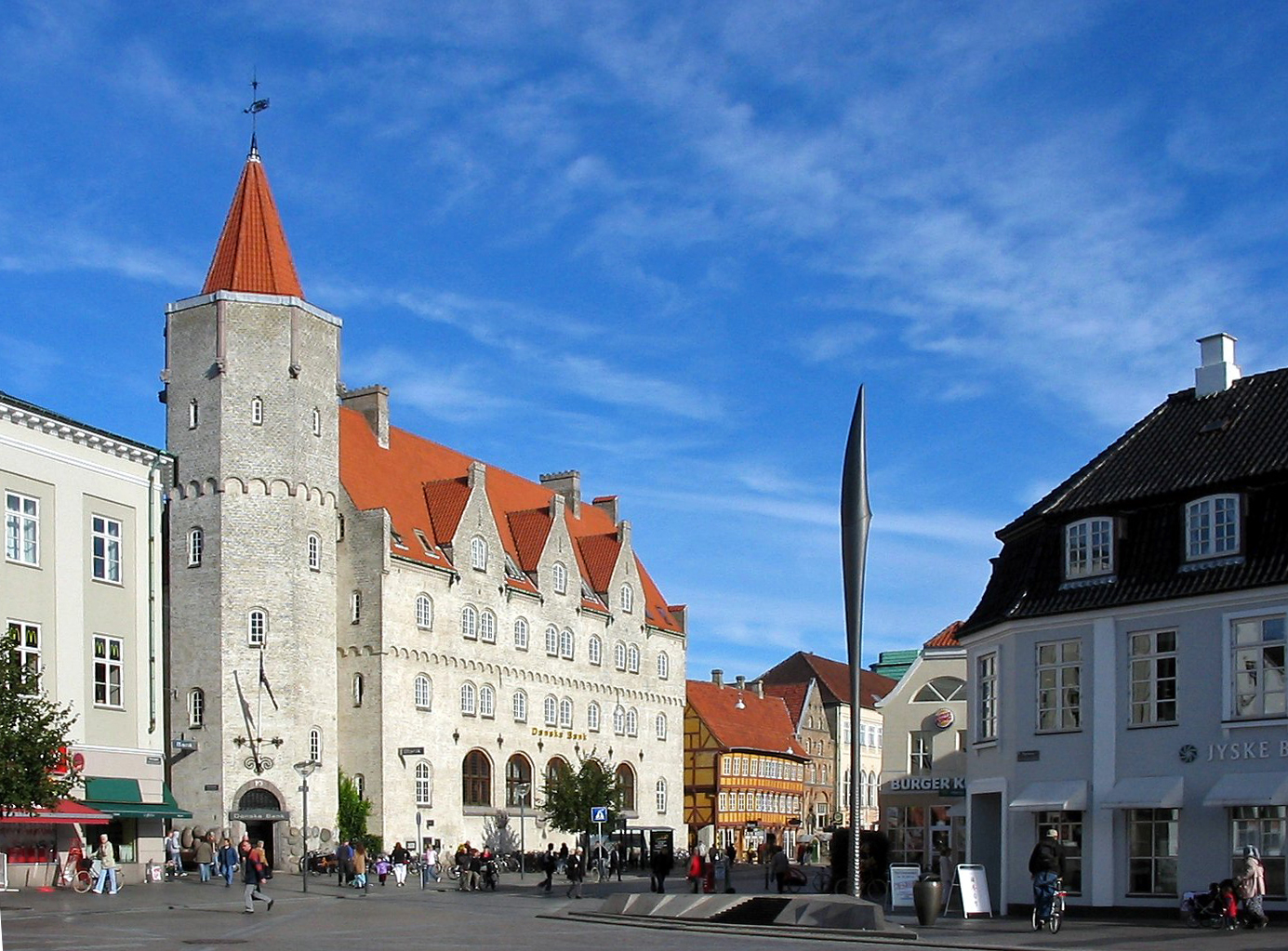
Nytorv Square

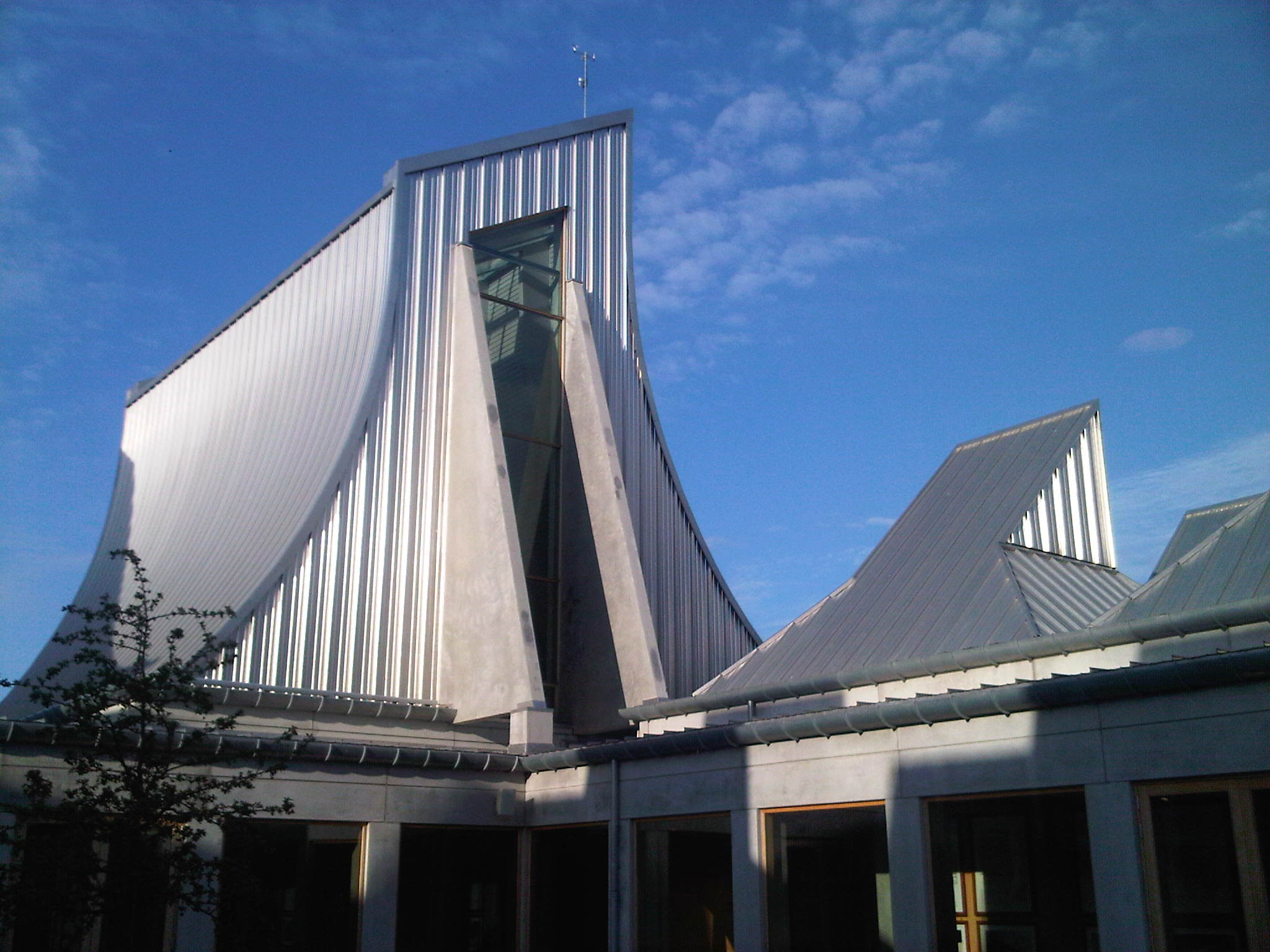
Utzon Center

Jomfru Ane Gade (literally Virgin Anne's Street) is one of the most famous streets in Aalborg if not in Denmark. Popular for its cafés and restaurants during the day, it is even busier at night with its clubs, discos and bars. During the 1990s, the street was infamously a 'hang out' of two biker gangs who were at war for some years all over Scandinavia. As the bikers disappeared it became increasingly popular for people of all ages. The pedestrian hubs of Nytorv Square and John F. Kennedy Square in the central city area are also part of the cityscape.

Aalborgtårnet is a tripod tower erected in 1933 with a restaurant on the top. The tower itself is 55 m (180 ft) high; but as it stands on the top of the Skovbakken hill, it reaches a total height of 105 m (344.49 ft) above sea level, providing a view over the sound and the city. Designed by Carlo Odgård, it was erected in 1933 in connection with the North Jutland Fair.

In 2008, the Utzon Center, its art, architecture and design credited to the noted architect Jørn Utzon, is also dedicated to him. It was built next to the Limfjord at the central harbour front in Aalborg. Born in Copenhagen, Utzon grew up in Aalborg. The centre contains an exhibition on Utzon's work, which includes the Sydney Opera House, as well as educational displays on architecture and design. The centre consists of several individual buildings creating a special place around a courtyard on a platform. The tall sculptural roofs of the auditorium and the boat-hall, both on the harbour front, and the library facing the park area and the city are set off by the lower roofs of the exhibition and workshop areas inside the complex.

== Culture ==
The annual Aalborg Carnival usually takes place in the last weekend of May. It consists of three events: the children's carnival (Danish: Børnekarneval), the battle of carnival bands, and the carnival proper. Attracting about 100,000 visitors, it is the biggest carnival in Scandinavia and one of the largest in northern Europe. Hjallerup Market in Hjallerup, about 20 kilometres (12 mi) northeast of Aalborg is one of the oldest and largest markets in Denmark and is the largest horse market in Europe. Held for three days in the beginning of June, it annually attracts more than 200,000 people and 1200 horses.

In 1999, Aalborg was for the first time one of the four host ports in The Tall Ships Race (then Cutty Sark Tall Ships Race) of that year. The city hosted the world's largest event for sailing vessels again in 2004, 2010, and 2015.

=== Major venues ===
Aalborg Carnival (2008)

Aalborgs Kongres & Kultur Center, designed in a functional style by Otto Frankild, was completed in 1952. The centre's main component, the Aalborg Hall, can be divided into sections. The complex also contains a hotel, restaurant, bowling alley, and a number of meeting rooms. The smaller Europahallen was added in 1991, making the centre the largest in Scandinavia. With over 100 theatrical and musical presentations per year, it offers international stars, opera, ballet, musicals, classical concerts, productions for children as well as pop and rock concerts. It can accommodate audiences of up to 2,500. Aalborg Teater, built in 1878 and subsequently modified by Julius Petersen, seats 870 in the main auditorium. First privately owned, the theatre is now controlled and owned by the Danish Ministry of Culture. While most productions are housed in the main hall, the building can accommodate up to four shows at once in halls of varying sizes. Over the years, the theatre has produced a wide selection of drama and musicals.

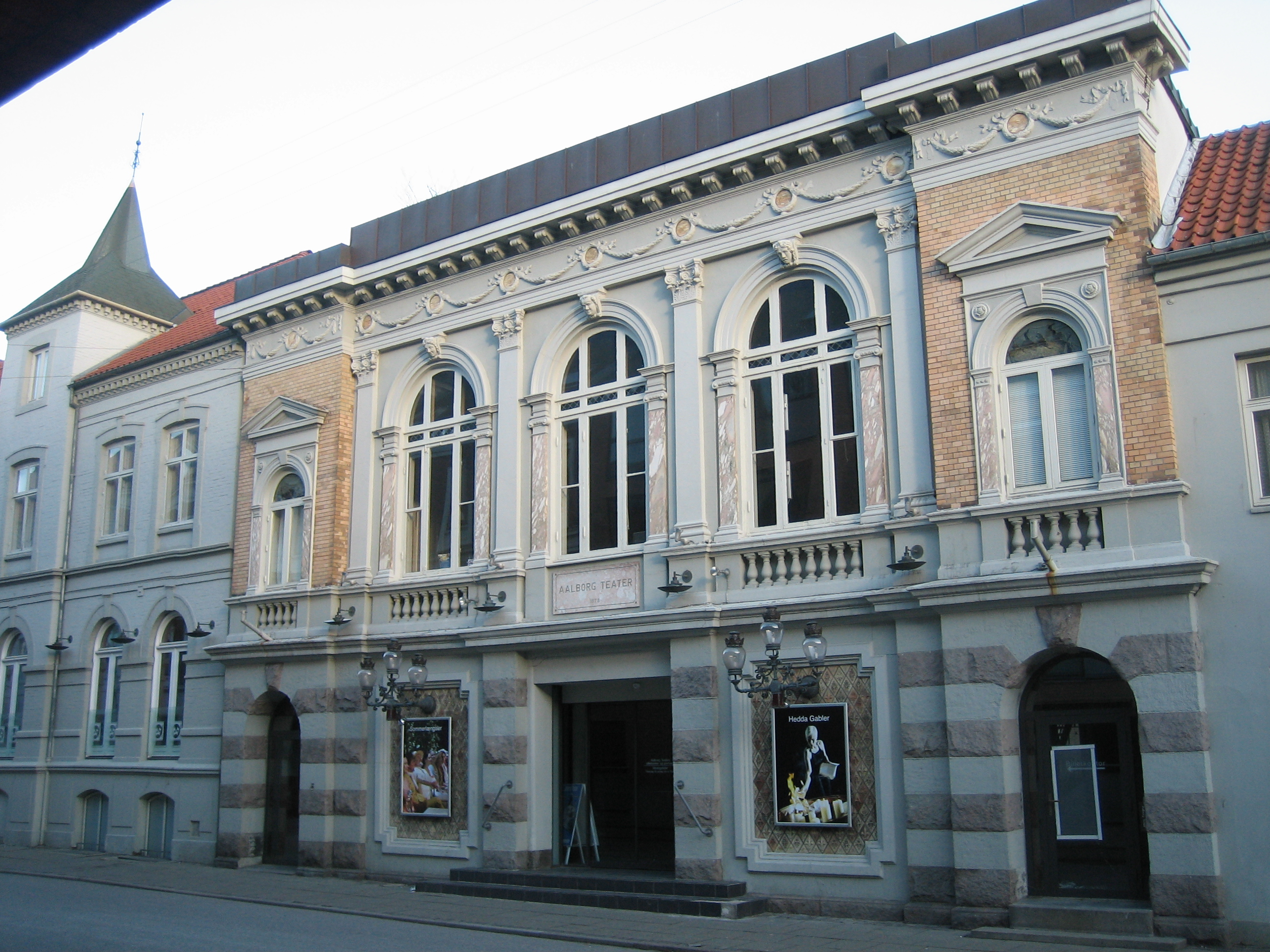
Aalborg Teater

Nordkraft is a cultural centre in a former power plant near the harbour. It has theatres, a cinema, and concert facilities. Kunsthal Nord, established in the centre in 2009, arranges up to five exhibitions a year of all forms of contemporary art, especially of local origin but also from other parts of Denmark and beyond. It serves as the exhibition centre for KunstVærket, the North Jutland centre for the arts, and also works in collaboration with the modern art museum Kunsten designed by the Finnish architect Alvar Aalto.

In the same neighbourhood, a huge concert hall, Musikkens Hus, designed by Coop Himmelb(l)au, opened in 2014. It is Aalborg's most ambitious construction project in recent years.

The city also has a wide selection of galleries and arts and crafts outlets operated by local artists. The Academy of Music also has a presence in Aarhus. There are several glass workshops; others produce jewelry, sculptures or exhibit paintings.

=== Museums ===
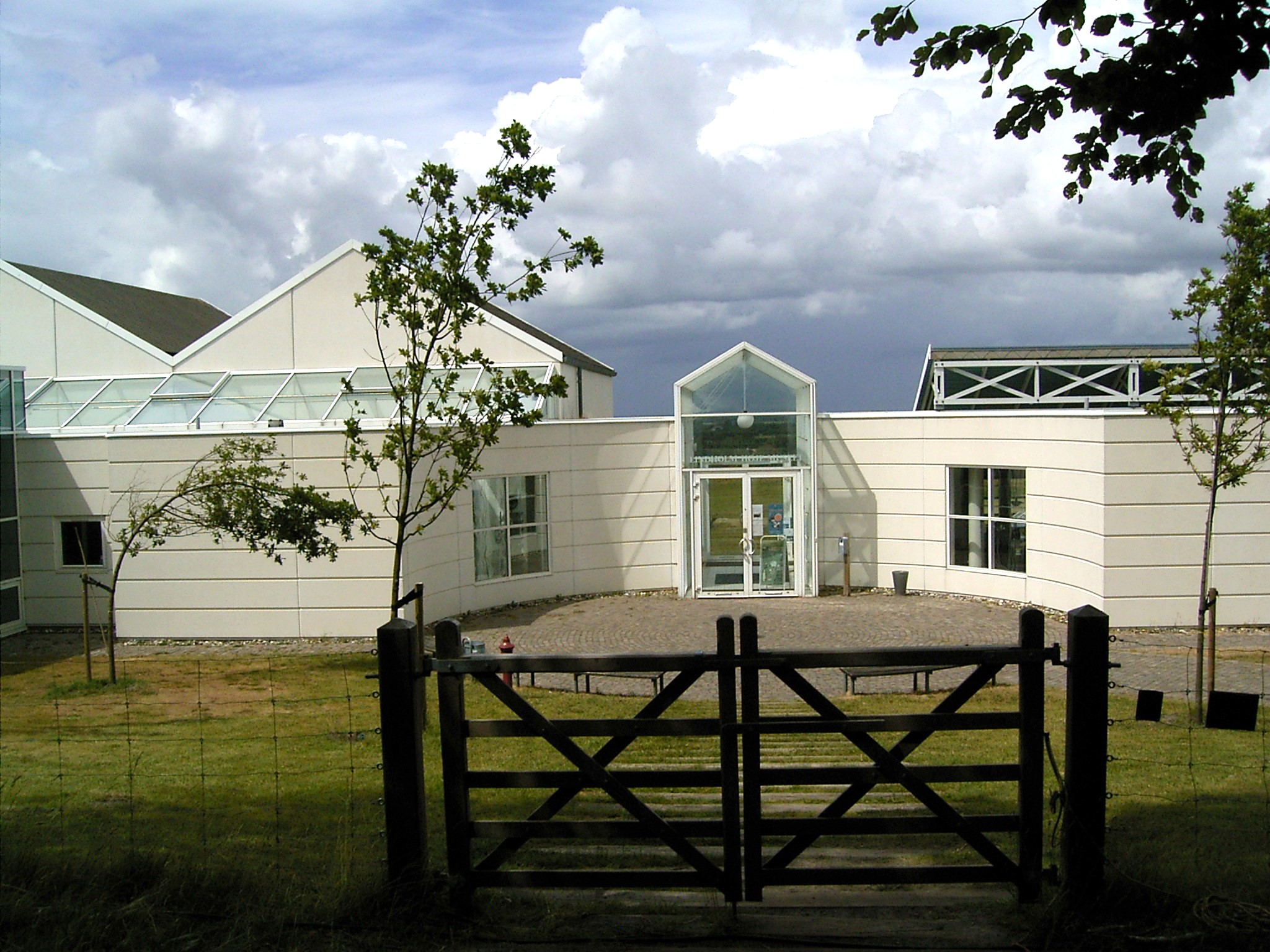
Lindholm Høje Museum

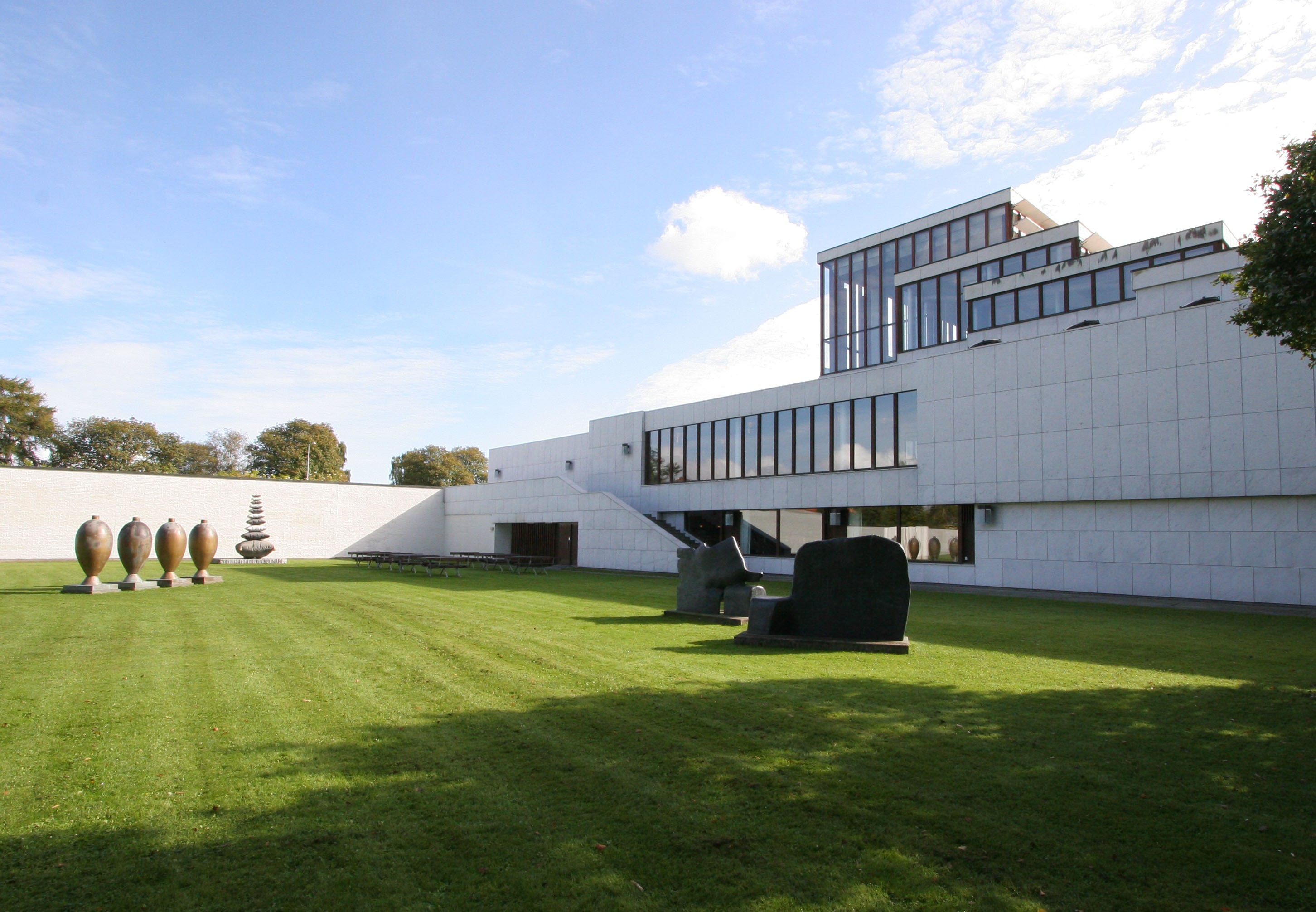
Museum of Modern Art and its sculpture garden

There are various museums in the city. The Aalborg Historical Museum was established in 1863, making it one of the earliest provincial museums in the country. The North Jutland Historical Museum conducted a series of archaeological excavations in the 1950s at Lindholm Høje, revealing ancient burial sites. In 1992, the Lindholm Høje Museum was opened there and extended in 2008. In 1994 and 1995, excavations at the site of the Greyfriars Monastery resulted in the creation of the underground Gråbrødrekloster Museum in the city centre. Several organisations now collaborate under the leadership of the North Jutland Historical Museum. The Springeren - Marine Experience Center is a marine museum on the city's wharf with a wide range of exhibits including "Springeren", an old Danish submarine, whence its name. The Aalborg Defence and Garrison Museum documents Danish defences during the Second World War as well as the history of Aaborg's garrison since 1779. The KUNSTEN Museum of Modern Art Aalborg was built from 1958 to 1972; the collection consists of around 1,500 art objects, including paintings, sculptures and other media.

=== Music ===
The Aalborg Symphony Orchestra (Danish: Aalborg Symfoniorkester) founded in 1943 presents about 150 concerts a year, frequently playing in the Musikkens Hus. It also plays for the Jutland opera company (Danish: Den Jyske Opera, also based in Aalborg), and at the Royal Danish Theatre in Copenhagen. It is one of the main organisers of the 10-day Aalborg Opera Festival held every March. Aalborg has the jazz club Jazzclub Satchmo and an annual jazz and blues festival (Danish: Den Blå Festival), also known as the Mini New Orleans Festival. Over four days in mid-August, concerts are performed on squares, in the streets, and in cafés and restaurants. Since 2012, the Egholm Festival, a small music festival on the island of Egholm near Aalborg has been organized in the first weekend of August.

== Religion ==
=== Lutheranism ===
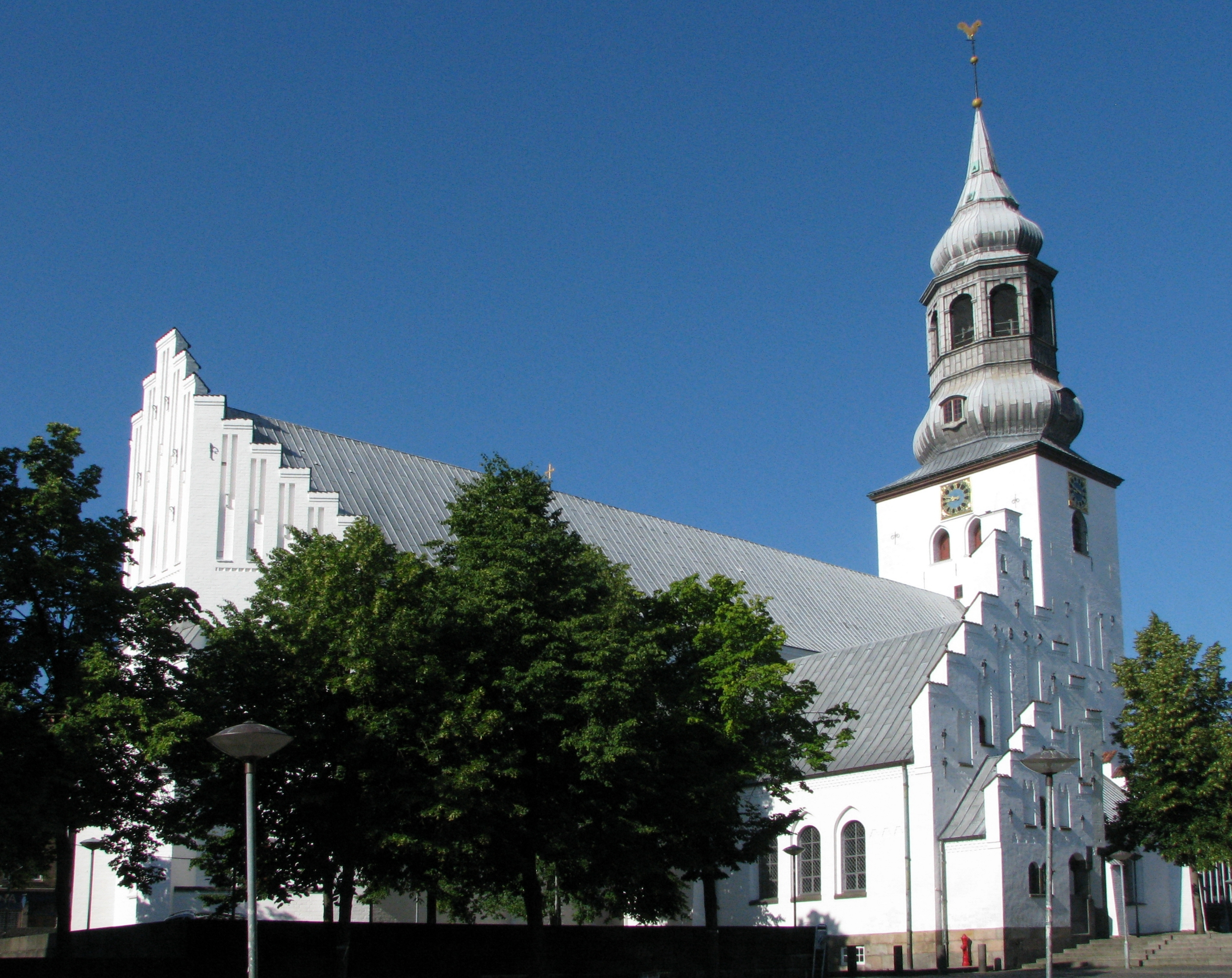
Budolfi Church

The principal religion in Aalborg as in the rest of Denmark is Christianity. Aalborg is the seat of a bishop within the Lutheran State Church of Denmark. The cathedral of this bishopric is the Budolfi Church, originally built no later than 1132 by Viborg's Bishop Eskil. This church was considerably smaller than the current one, as it was merely a parish church. The existing structure was completed in the late 14th century, on the grounds of the former church, and was listed for the first time in the Atlas of Denmark in 1399. The church was named after St Botolph, an English abbot and saint. The church is constructed in the Gothic style. In 1554 Aalborg was made a diocese and, after consideration, St Budolfi Church was made the seat of the Bishop of Aalborg. Aalborg is also home to the former Catholic church, the Abbey of Our Lady, converted from a Benedictine nunnery.

==== Churches ====
The present Budolfi Church, which has the status of a cathedral, dates from the end of the 14th century, although at least two earlier churches stood on the same spot. Built in the Gothic style, it consists of a nave flanked by two aisles, a tower, and a porch. After the original tower was destroyed by fire in 1663, the striking new Baroque tower, based on that of an earlier Copenhagen city hall, was completed in 1779. The church has 16th-century frescoes and an intricately carved early Baroque altarpiece from 1689 created by Lauridtz Jensen.

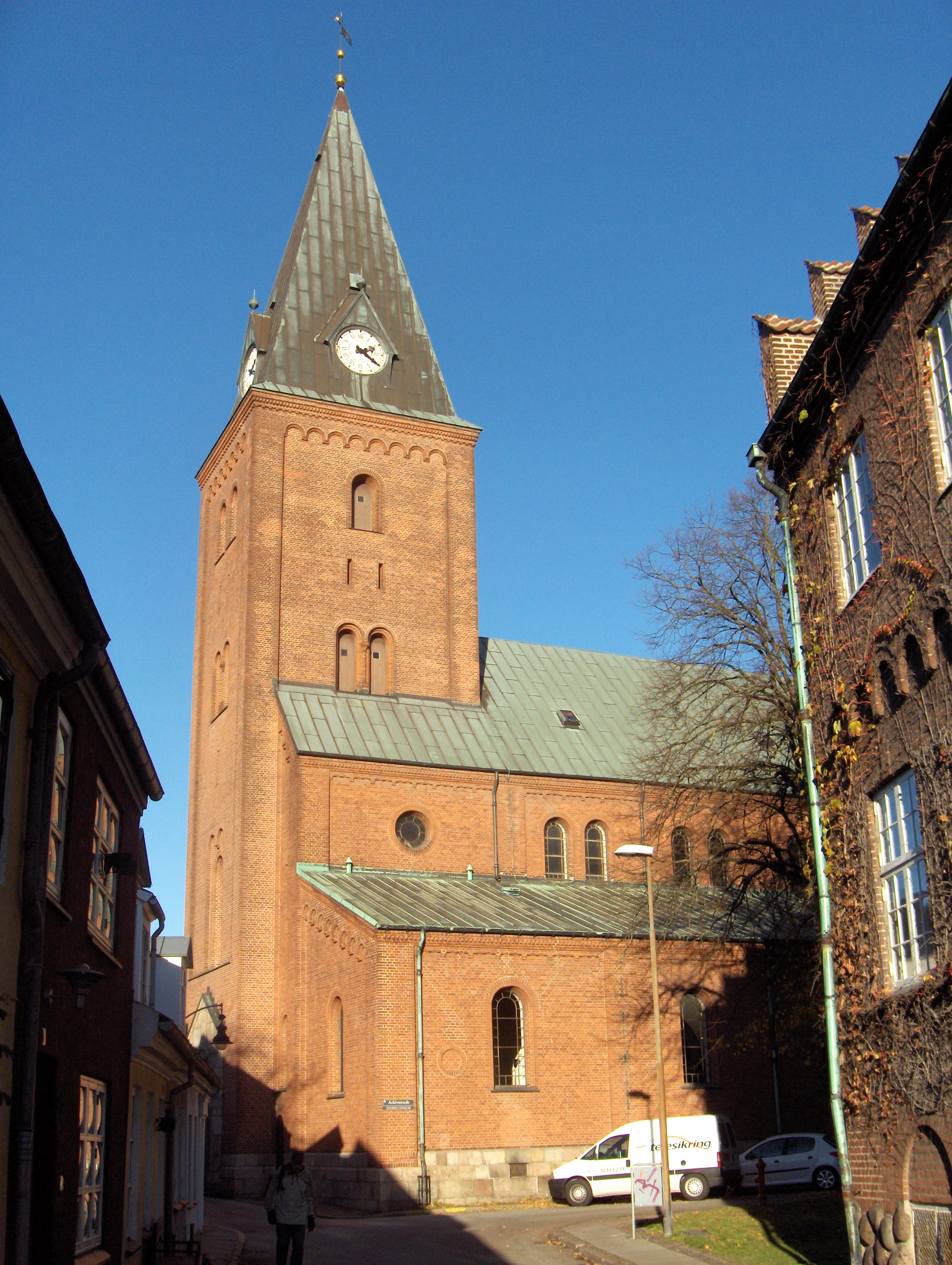
Abbey of Our Lady (Vor Frue Kirke)

Abbey of Our Lady (Vor Frue Kirke) was designed in 1878 by J.E. Gnudtzmann in the Neo-Romanesque style. The original Church of Our Lady from the early 12th century was pulled down after the Reformation because it was old and unstable, but the 12th-century tower and the original portal with sculpted decorations can still be seen. The carved pulpit dates to around 1581.

As a result of the considerable population increase from the end of the 19th century, a number of new churches were built in various styles. Next to Aalborg Hall, Ansgar's Church with its tall tower was built in 1929 to a design by Hother August Paludan in a modern Baroque style. St Mark's Church (Sankt Markus Kirke), completed in 1933, was designed by Einar Packness. Its tower is crowned by an imposing spire. The Biblical figures known as the Johannes Group (based on Christ's meeting with John the Baptist in Matthew, Chapter 3) sculpted by Bertel Thorvaldsen are displayed around the interior. The Margrethe Church with its steeply sloping roof reaching 22 m (72 ft) is the work of Carlo Odgaard and Aaby Sørensen. Bent Exner designed some of the artefacts in the church including the crucifix over the altar.

==== Cemeteries ====
Aalborg's cemeteries have a history dating to the end of the Middle Ages. Sankt Jørgens Kirkegård (St George's Cemetery) was on the corner of Hasserisgade and Kirkegårdsgade. The site was chosen in a district outside the city as it provided isolation for those affected by the plague, many of whom died in the neighbouring hospice, Sankt Jørgens Gårde. In 1794, a new cemetery was opened in Klostermarken, immediately to the south of Sankt Jørgens Kirkegård. It was further extended in 1804, 1820 and 1870. It is now known as Aalborgs Almen Kirkegård (meaning "common cemetery") and contains the graves of many of the city's most notable citizens.

=== Judaism ===
Aalborg had a synagogue, built in 1854; and the Jewish rabbi Salomon Mielziner served it for 35 years. Services were no longer offered after Mielziner died, and in 1924 the synagogue was donated to the city government, which began using it to store the city archives (Stadsarkivet). It was burned down by the Schalburg Corps in April 1945 towards the end of World War II, destroying its centuries-old Torahs. Antisemitism continues to exist in Denmark, and in 1999, an unlicensed Nazi radio station began operating from a neo-Nazi stronghold in Fynen, Nørresundby, within Aalborg municipality. The activity has been widely denounced with organized opposition in Aalborg and the rest of Denmark, and in February 1999, 12 anti-fascists were arrested for possession of explosives at their base in Fynen.

== Education ==
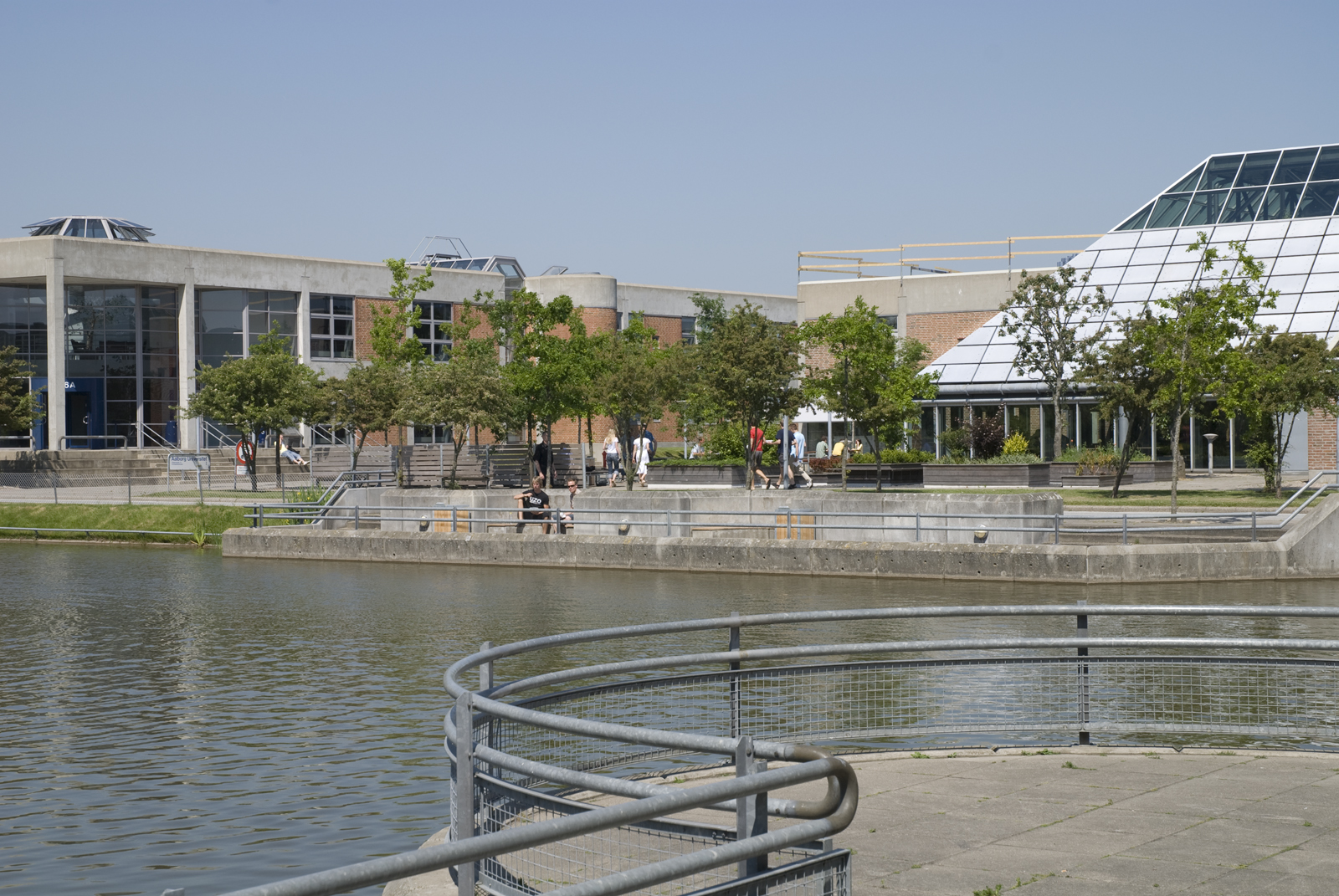
Aalborg University (AAU), Campus East, as seen during summertime. (Note: Aalborg University (AAU) attracts several thousands new students on an annual basis in the town of Aalborg which temporarily increases its population.)

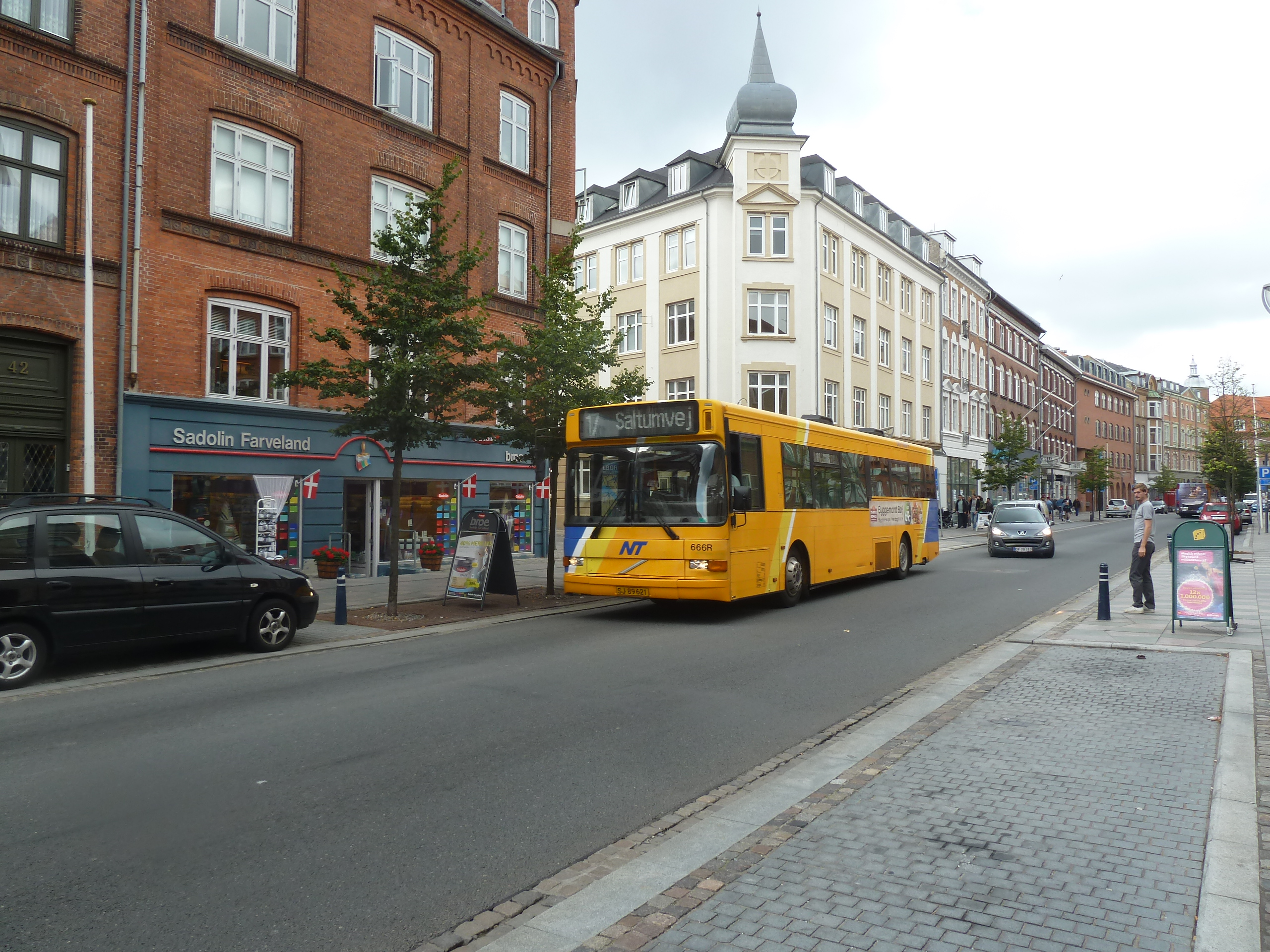
Boulevarden in Aalborg's town centre, seen in 2011. (Note: The white building at Boulevarden 38 pertains to the International Accommodation Office of Aalborg University (AAU) and is inhabited predominantly by MSc international students on an annual basis.)

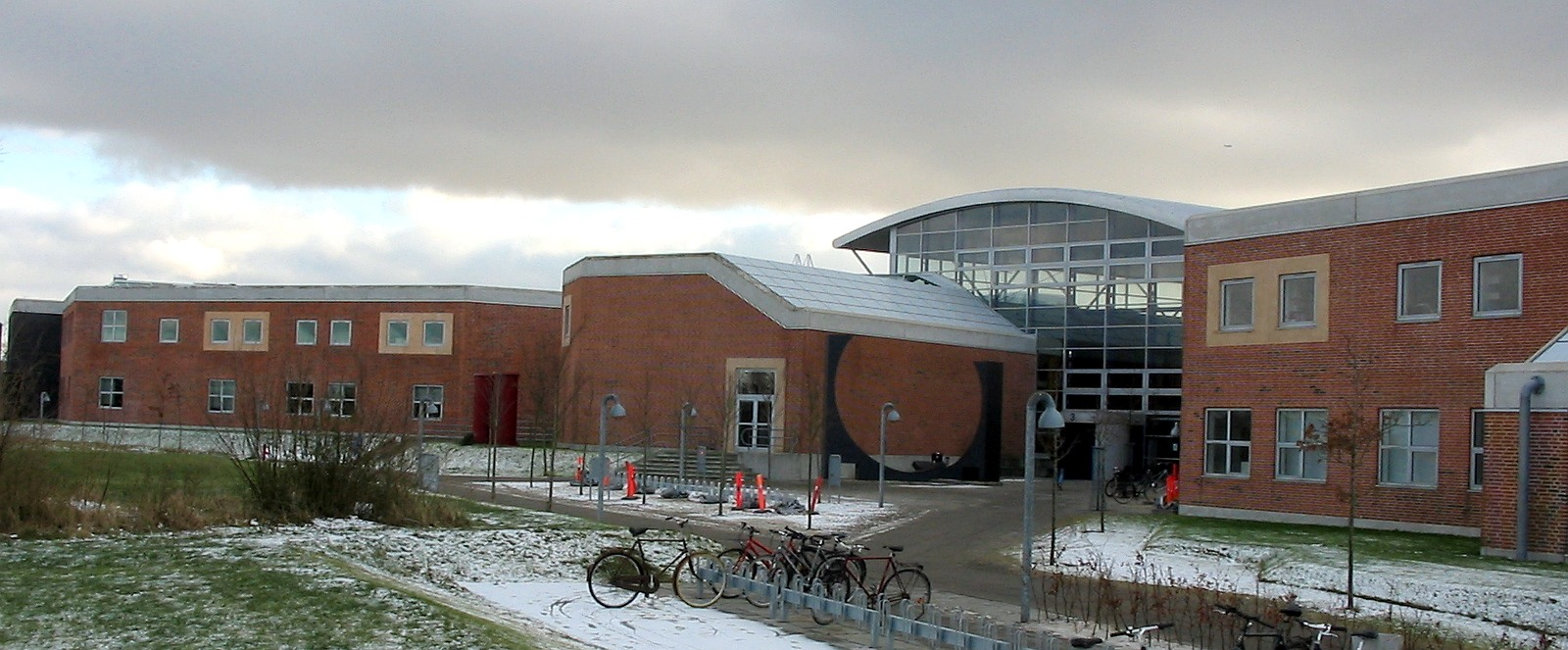
Aalborg University (AAU), Campus East

The major university in Aalborg is the University of Aalborg (AAU), founded in 1974. It has more than 17,000 students and more than 3,000 employees. In 2012, 3,000 new students started at the university. In 1995 it merged with Esbjerg Engineering College. The university has attempted from the outset to "develop a more "relevant" form of education than was then being offered by the established universities". It has sought to develop what is known as "contextual knowledge", a form of problem-based learning based around the project work conducted by students, rather than the curriculum focusing on traditional academic disciplines.

The University College of Northern Denmark is one of seven new regional organisations (professionshøjskoler) of different study sites in Denmark offering courses normally at the bachelor level. The Royal School of Library and Information Science (RSLIS) provides higher education in library and information science; one of its two departments is in Aalborg. With about 4,500 students a year and 700 employees, Tech College Aalborg offers a wide spectrum of vocational training and runs Aalborg Tekniske Gymnasium. Aalborg Business College provides basic training in retail and trading for private enterprises and the public sector, with courses which cover information technology, economics, sales and communication, and languages.

The island of Egholm contains the former Egholm Skole, which was closed in 1972 when a ferry service to Aalborg was established and children on the island began attending the Vesterkæret Skole in Aalborg. Today the old school on Egholm is run as a school camp by the City of Aalborg, with 18 beds and facilities for 60 people. Skipper Clement International School is a private school for children between 6 and 16. The international department conducts its classes in both Danish and English, the first to be established in the Jutland peninsula.

== Sport ==
The city is home to Aalborg BK, established in 1885 and known as "AaB" for short. The club has won the Danish championship (Superliga) four times in recent years; 1995, 1999, 2008 and 2014. The team qualified for the group stages of the 1995–96 and 2008–09 UEFA Champions League seasons. Aalborg Chang is a Danish amateur association football club, previously known as FC Nordjylland.

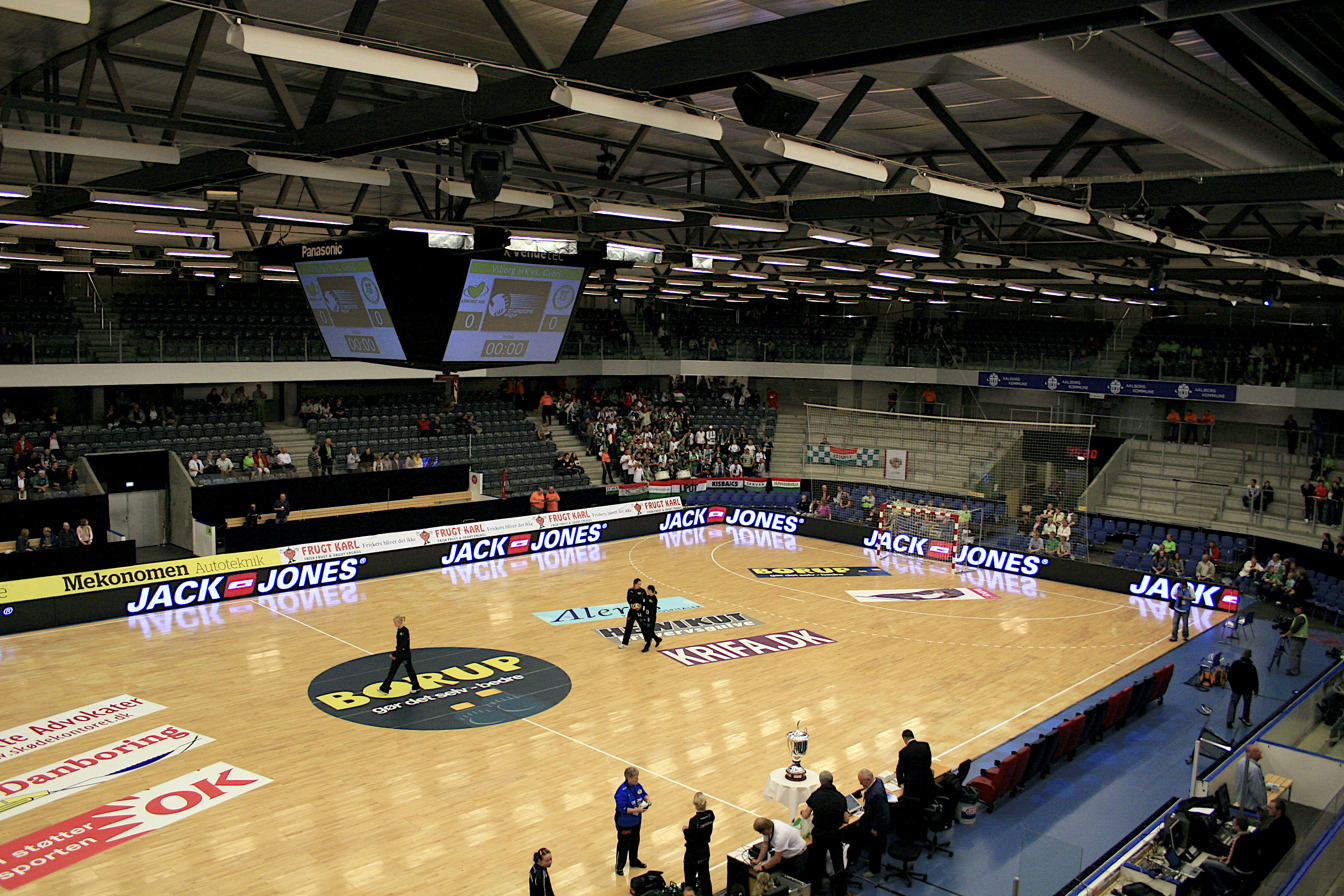
The Gigantium (also sometimes used as an examination hall by the AAU)

Aalborg is also known for the women's handball club Aalborg DH, and the men's handball club Aalborg Håndbold. Established in 2001 and 2011, respectively, they both play their games in the Gigantium. Rugby in Aalborg is represented by Aalborg RK Lynet (Lightning), established in 1964. The city also has the Aalborg Cricket Club, which is part of the Danish Cricket League. They were established in 2000 and have players from various nations.

Aalborg Tennisklub is located along the Kastetvej road in the centre of Aalborg. About 10 kilometres (6.2 mi) to the southwest of the city, near the hamlet of Restrup Enge, is Aalborg Golf Klub. Aalborg Golf Klub is the second oldest golf club in Denmark, and was originally established in 1908 in the eastern part of Aalborg. In 1929 it moved to Sohngaardsholm, but 30 years later the course had to again move because of developments with the university. The present course to the southwest of Aalborg was designed in 1968 by Graham Lockey and Commander John Harris as a 9-hole course, later expanded to 18 holes in 1976 and 27 in 2006. In 2010 the club hosted the European Girls Team Golf Championships. Another course, Ørnehoj Golfklub, is at the southeastern limits of the city, in the village of Gistrup.

On 11 September 1977, Aalborg hosted the Final of the Long Track World Championship for Motorcycle speedway, which was won by Swedish rider Anders Michanek.

== Transport ==
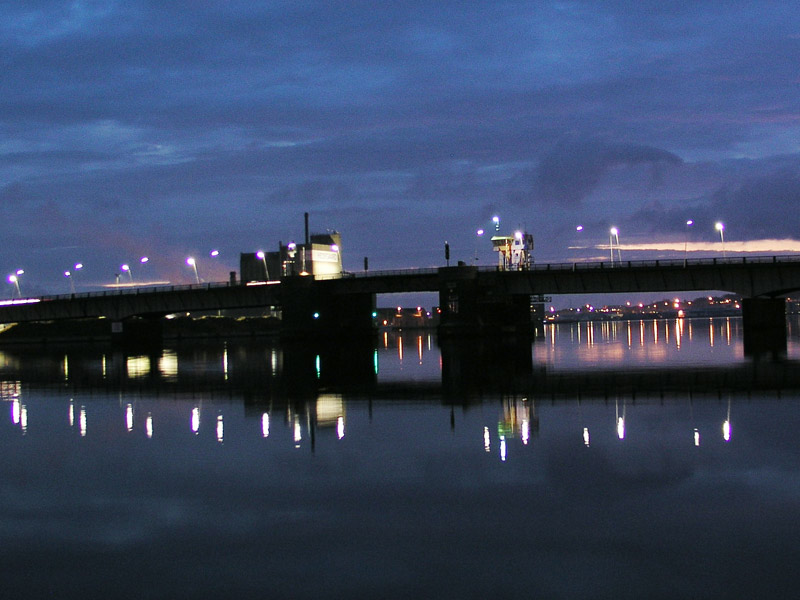
Limfjordsbroen

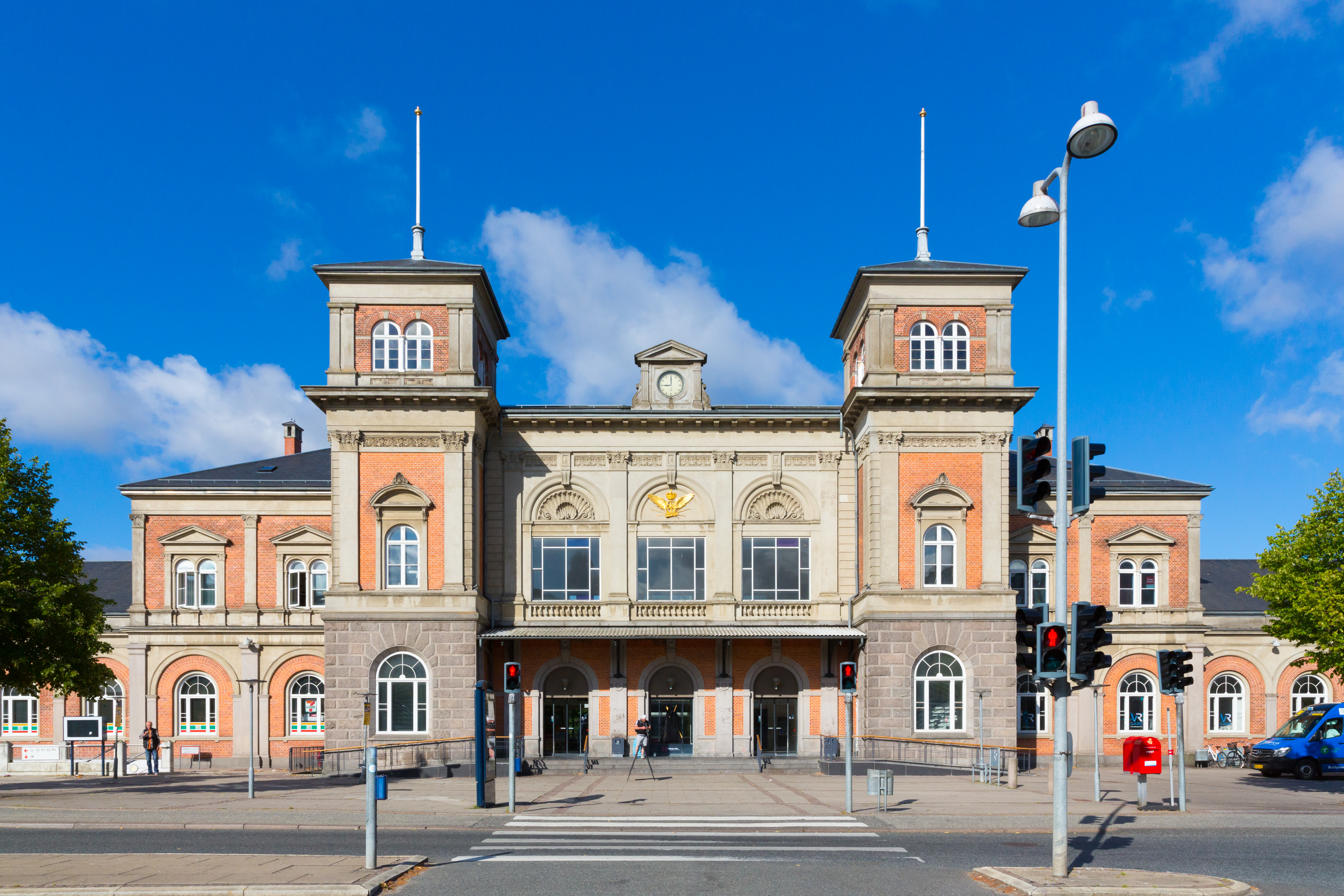
Aalborg railway station

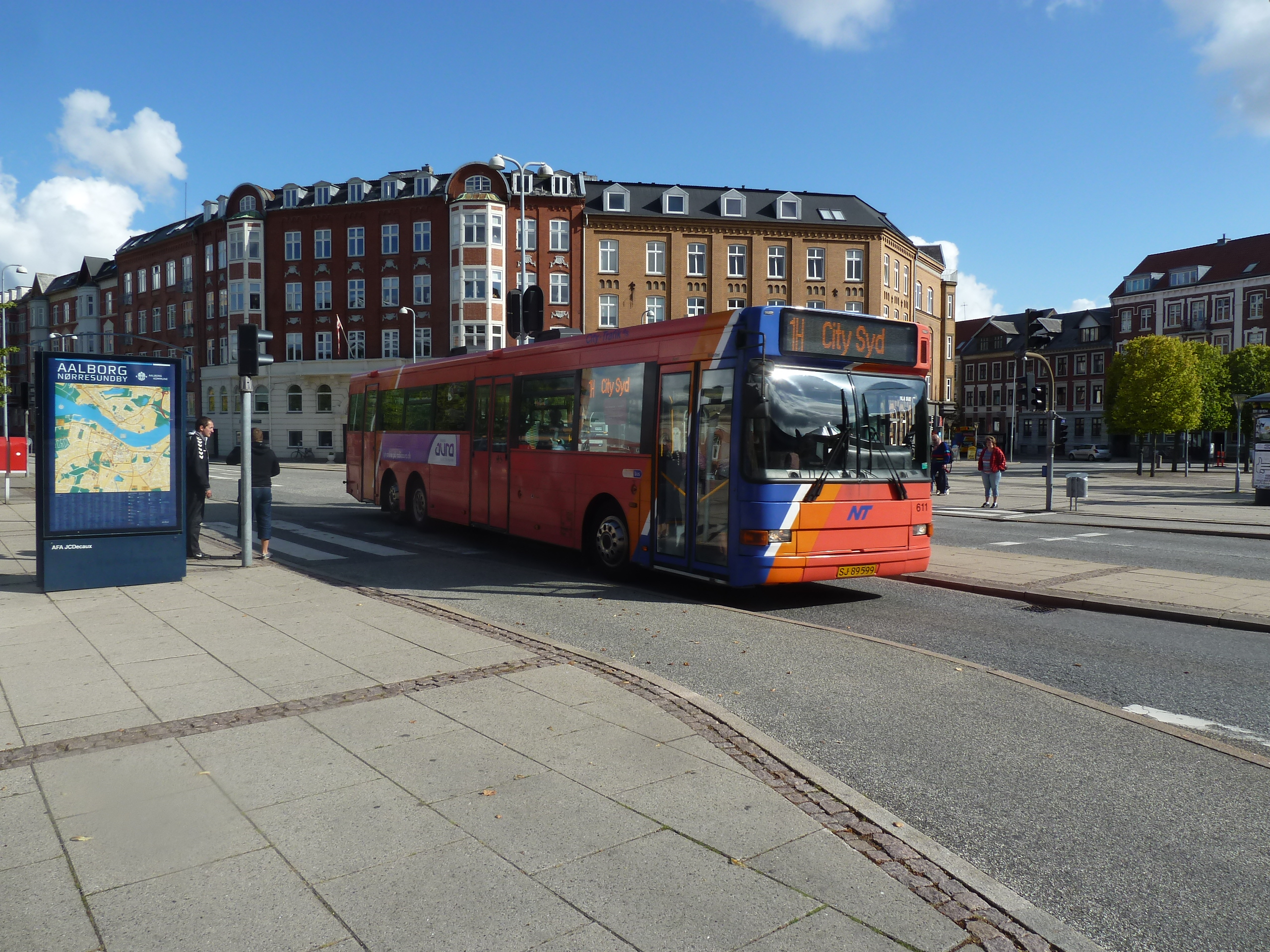
John F. Kennedy Plads

=== Roads and bridges ===
On the north side of the Limfjord is Nørresundby, connected to Aalborg by the Limfjordsbroen road bridge, which was inaugurated in 1933, replacing a pontoon bridge which dated to 1865. The iron Limfjord Railway Bridge, inaugurated in 1938, is a nine-span bascule bridge. It opens 4,000 times a year, allowing around 10,000 vessels to sail under it. Opening in 1969 as the first motorway tunnel to be built in Denmark, the Limfjord Tunnel is 582 m (1,909 ft) long and has three lanes in each direction. It forms part of the E45, stretching from Alta, Norway, to Gela, Italy.

=== Air transport ===
Aalborg Airport is 6 kilometres (3.7 mi) northwest of the city centre. With its two runways, it has 20 direct routes to destinations in Denmark, Norway, the Netherlands, the UK, Spain, and Turkey, along with seasonal flights to additional Spanish destinations and the Faroe Islands. Processing 1.4 million passengers a year, the airport is the third largest in Denmark. The Aalborg Air Base, an important Danish Air Force facility, occupies part of the extensive airport area. The Port of Aalborg is northern Denmark's main import/export hub, operated by Aalborg Havn A/S on the Limfjord. Two additional private harbours serve the cement factory, Aalborg Portland A/S, and the power station, Vattenfall A/S.

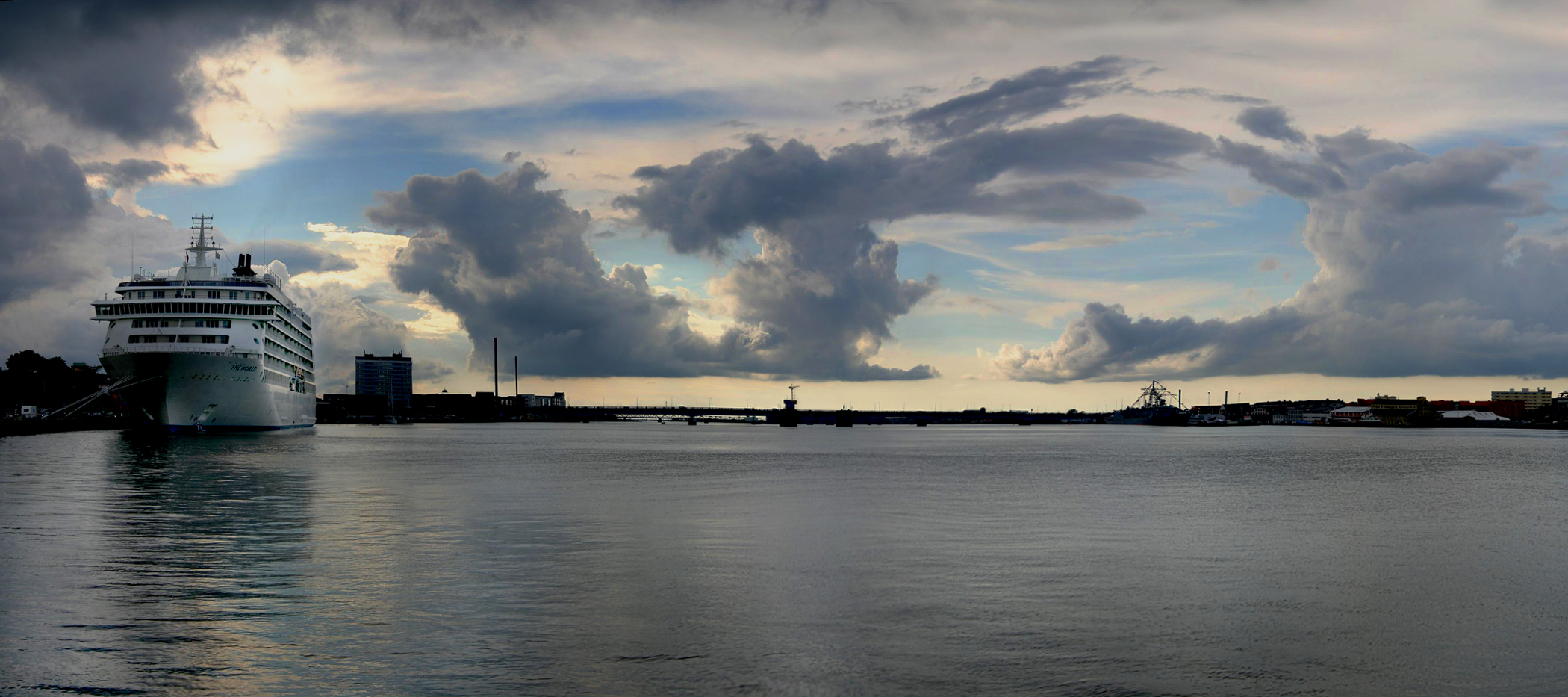
A cruise ship in Port of Aalborg

=== Rail transport ===
The city's main train station, Aalborg Railway Station, is on John F. Kennedys Plads. It opened in 1869, when the Aalborg to Randers railway line was inaugurated. The original station building was designed by N.P.C. Holsøe while the present building, which opened in 1902, was designed by Thomas Arboe. Aalborg Railway Station is operated by Banedanmark and the railway companies DSB and Nordjyske Jernbaner. Other rail stations in Aalborg are Skalborg Station, Aalborg Vestby Station and Lindholm Station.

=== Local public transit ===
There are regular bus services covering the inner city as well as the wider urban area.

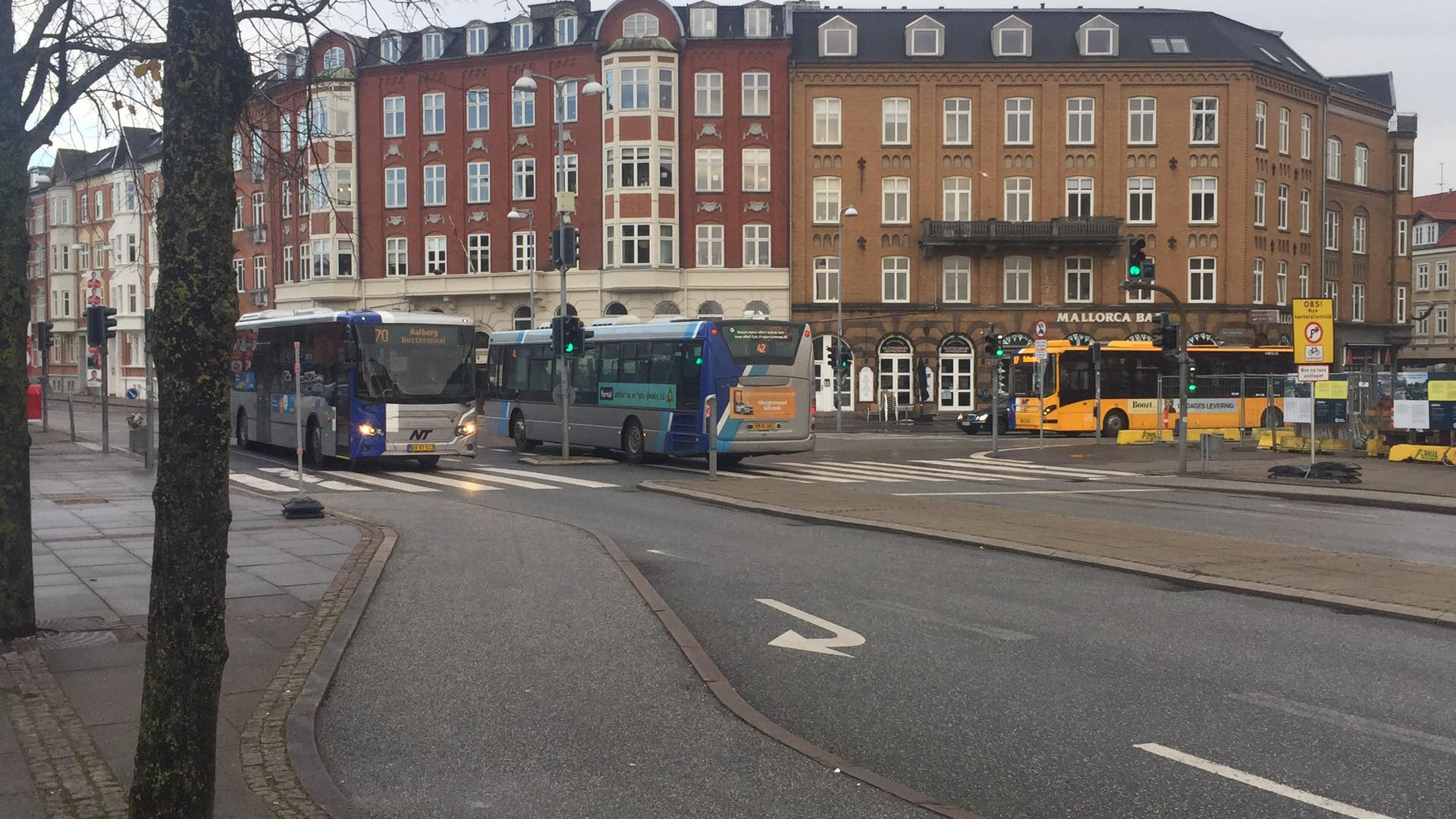
NT buses with different designs in John F. Kennedy Plads (December 2021)

==== Discussion about Light Rail and Bus Rapid Transit ====
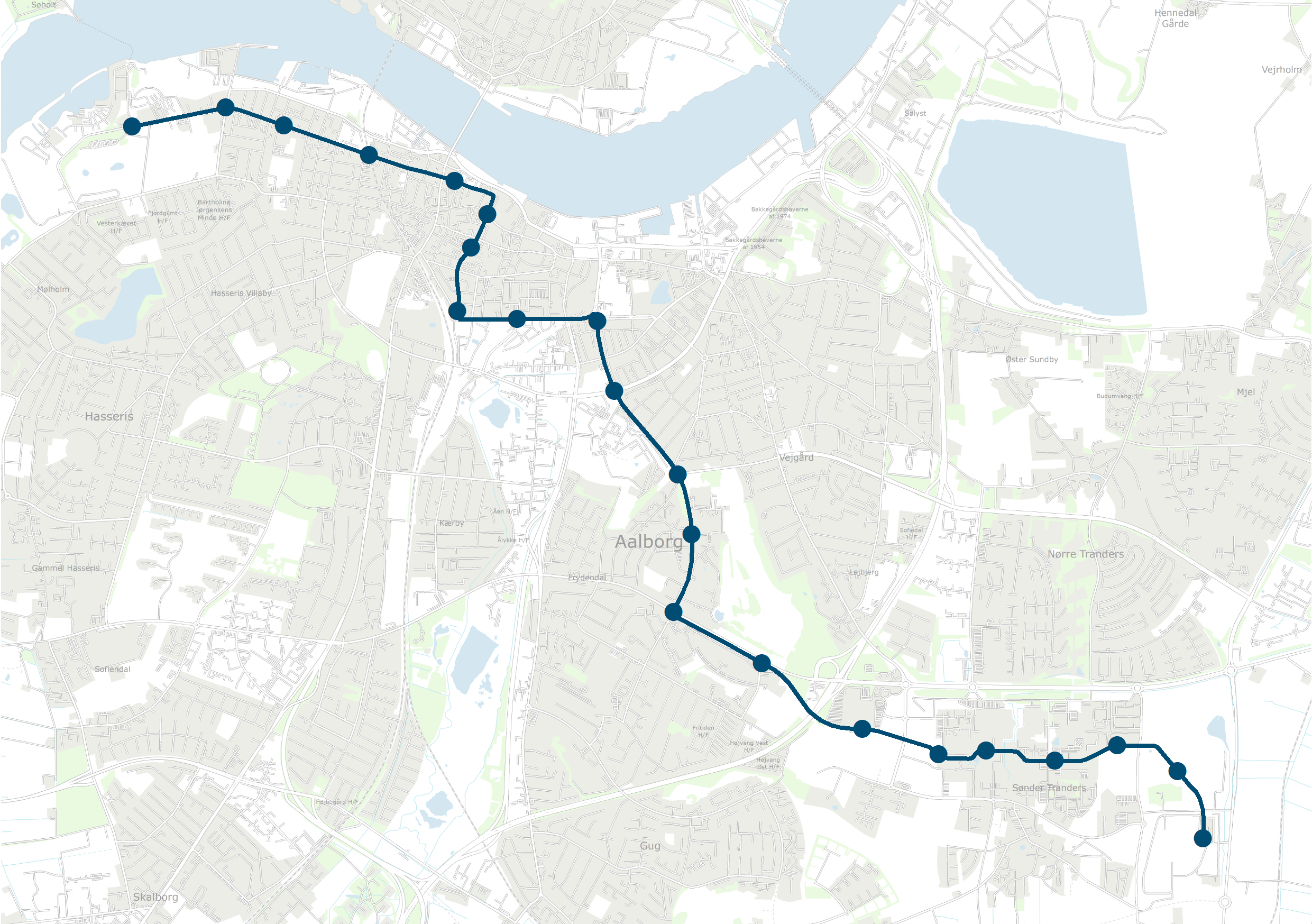
the Bus Rapid Transit line opened in 2023

In 2008, plans were made to build a light rail system to serve Aalborg, similar to Odense Letbane and Aarhus Letbane. In 2014, the government committed funding to light rail in Aalborg, only to retract the funding after a Venstre-led cabinet was elected in the 2015 general election, replacing the Social Democrat-led government that had approved the funds. In 2017, government funding was approved to build a bus rapid transit system instead of the light rail. The system known as Plusbus eventually opened on 23 September 2023.

=== Cycling ===
Cycling is also relatively popular in Aalborg. Statistics for 2012 indicate 44% of the population use their bicycles several times a week while 27% of the workforce cycle to work. The municipal authorities hope to increase the use of bicycles by providing better cycle tracks and parking facilities, as well as improved support services. Starting from 2009, city bikes were provided free of charge in Aalborg and Nørresundby from April to November with numerous stands throughout the area, however the city bike system was closed down in 2014 when funding ran out.

== Healthcare ==
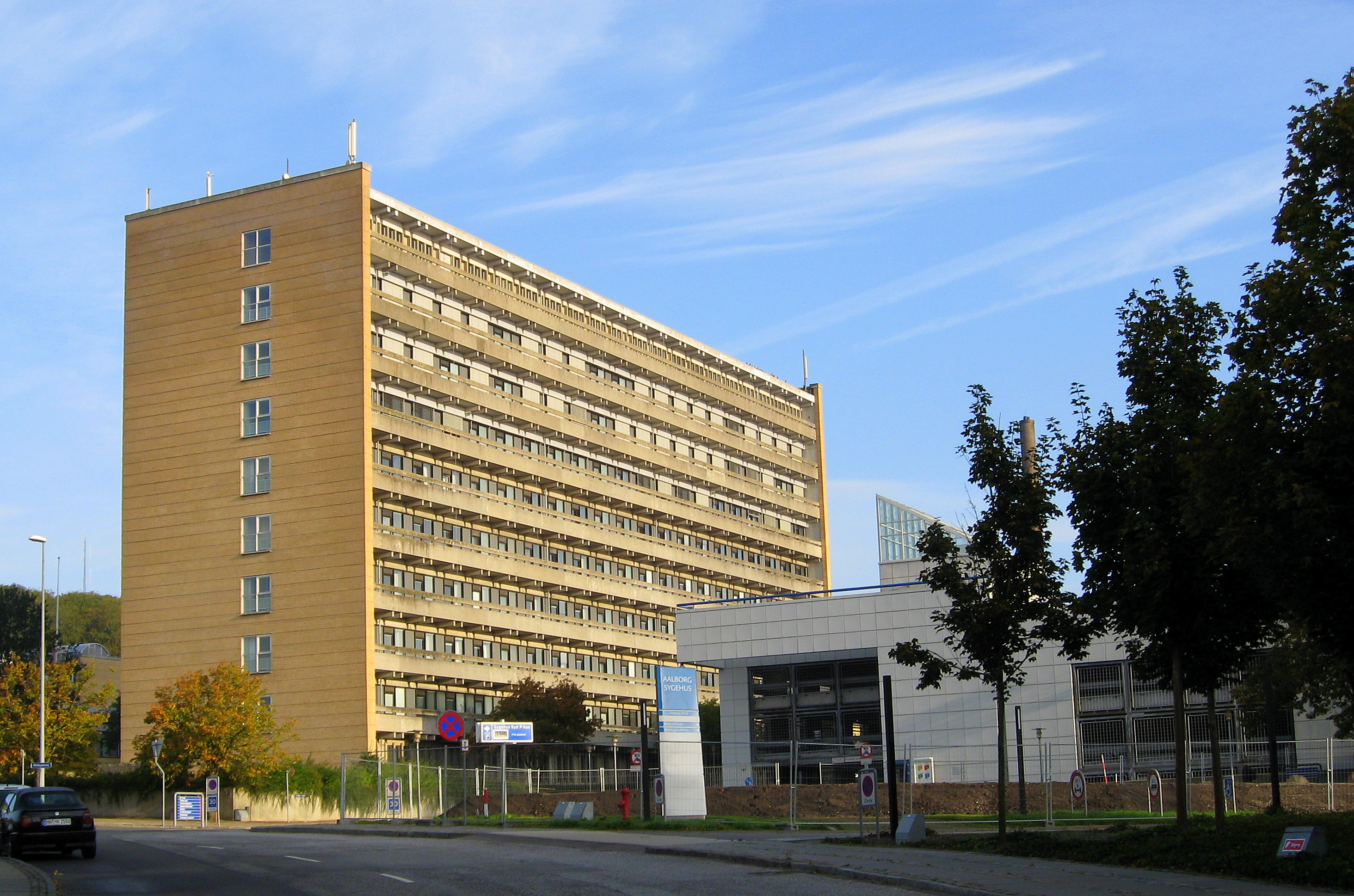
Aalborg University Hospital, south section

Aalborg University Hospital, the largest in the north of Jutland, was founded in 1881. As of 2013, it consists of two large buildings in Aalborg, the hospital in Dronninglund and smaller departments in Hobro and Hjørring. It is the largest employer in the area with around 6,500 on the payroll. The hospital has traditionally undertaken research but from the beginning of 2013 it has had a formal collaboration with Aalborg University. A new building, designed by schmidt hammer lassen architects and to be completed by 2020, will provide 134,000 m^{2} (1,440,000 sq ft) for hospital buildings and 17,000 m^{2} (180,000 sq ft) for the university's Faculty of Health. The Aalborg University Hospital, section south, is on Hobrovej and has a 24-hour emergency ward. The northern section is in Reberbanegade, which is in the western part of the city centre. Trænregimentet, the Danish regiment for army supply and emergency medical personnel, is also in Aalborg.

== Media ==
Nordjyske Stiftstidende, published in Aalborg, is Denmark's second oldest newspaper founded in 1767 as Nyttige og fornøyelige Jydske Efterretninger. It was later known as Aalborg Stiftstidende (until 1999). In 1827, it merged with Aalborg's second newspaper Aalborgs Stifts Adresse-Avis. The paper now serves the whole of Vendsyssel and most of Himmerland and has local editions in Aalborg, Hjørring, Hobro, Frederikshavn, Fjerritslev, Skagen, and Brønderslev.

ANR (also Aalborg Nærradio and Alle Nordjyders Radio) is a local radio station operated by Nordjyske Medier, owner of Nordjyske Stiftstidende. The TV news channel, 24Nordjyske, is operated by the same firm.

== Notable people ==
Among those who contributed to Aalborg's prosperity in the 19th century were Poul Pagh (1796–1870) who significantly developed trade and shipping, and Christen Winther Obel (1800–1860) who increased production at the C.W. Obel tobacco factory until it became the city's main employer. Another important figure of the times was Marie Rée (1835–1900) who ran the local newspaper Aalborg Stiftstidende until 1900, often promoting women's rights.

More recently, the actor and script-writer Preben Kaas (1930–1981), who was born in Aalborg, starred in over 50 Danish films. Among the city's many sporting figures, Peter Gade (born 1976) stands out as one of the world's most successful badminton players.

On the cultural side, Jørn Utzon (1918–2008), designer of the Sydney Opera House, grew up in Aalborg; the iconic Utzon Center which he inspired now serves as a museum for his architectural designs and offers courses of study based on his approach.

== Twin towns – sister cities ==
Aalborg is twinned with:

- Almere, Netherlands 1984
- Antibes, France 1967
- Büdelsdorf, Germany 2007
- Dandenong, Australia 1984
- Edinburgh, United Kingdom 1964
- Fredrikstad, Norway 1951
- Fuglafjørður, Faroe Islands 1987
- Galway, (Republic of Ireland) Ireland 1997
- Gdynia, Poland 1966
- Haifa, Israel 1972
- Innsbruck, Austria 1967
- Ittoqqortoormiit, Greenland 1963
- Karlskoga, Sweden 1963
- Lancaster, United Kingdom 1977
- Lerum, Sweden 2007
- Liperi, Finland 2007
- Norðurþing, Iceland 1966
- Nuuk, Greenland 1963
- Orsa, Sweden 2007
- Orust, Sweden 2007
- Ośno, Poland 2007
- Racine, United States 1965
- Rapperswil-Jona, Switzerland 1968
- Rendalen, Norway 2007
- Rendsburg, Germany 1967
- Riga, Latvia 1989
- Riihimäki, Finland 1961
- Solvang, United States 1971
- Tulcea, Romania 1970
- Vilnius, Lithuania 1979
- Varna, Bulgaria 1976
- Wismar, Germany 1961

== Gallery ==
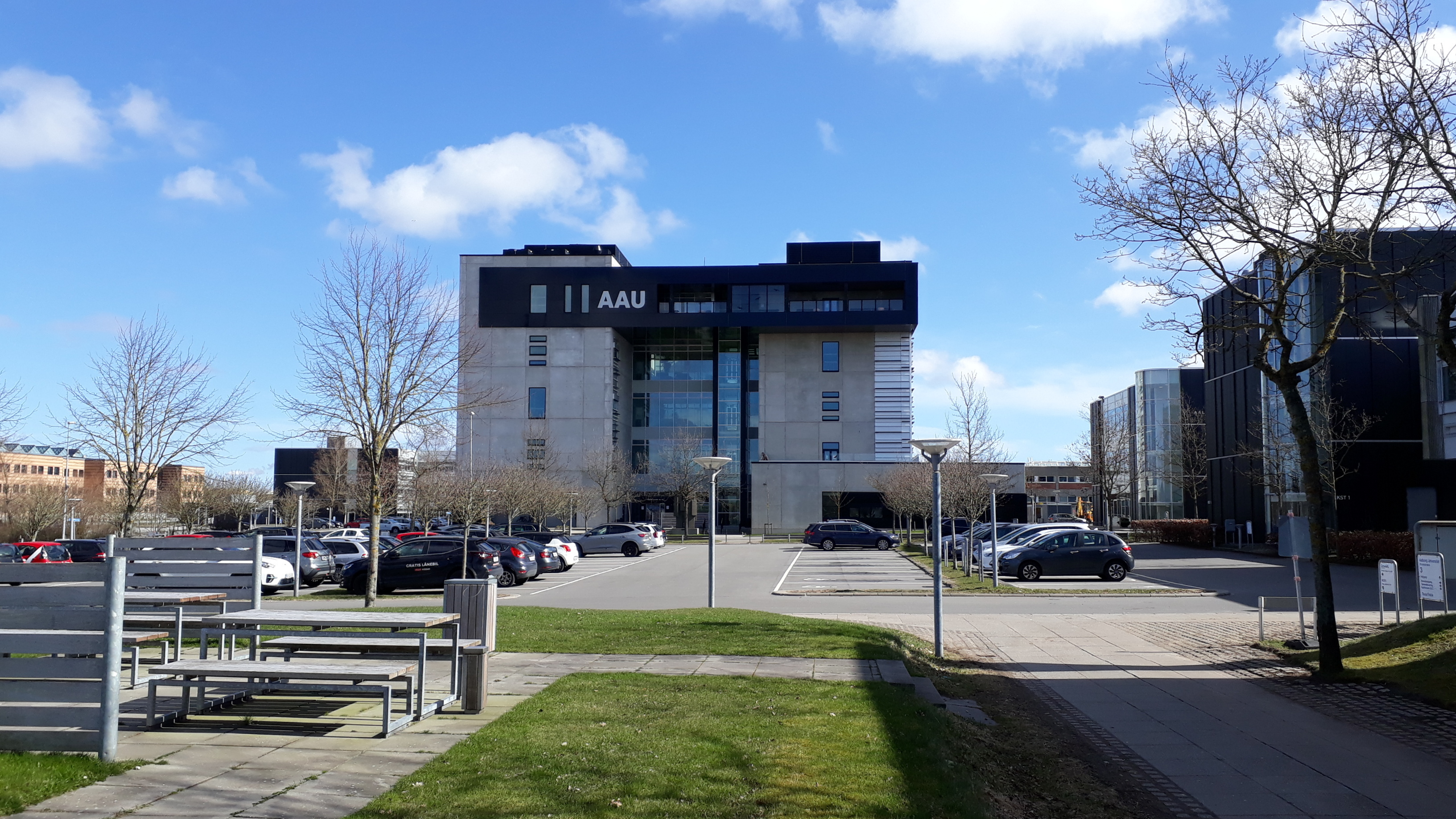
Aalborg University, Campus East

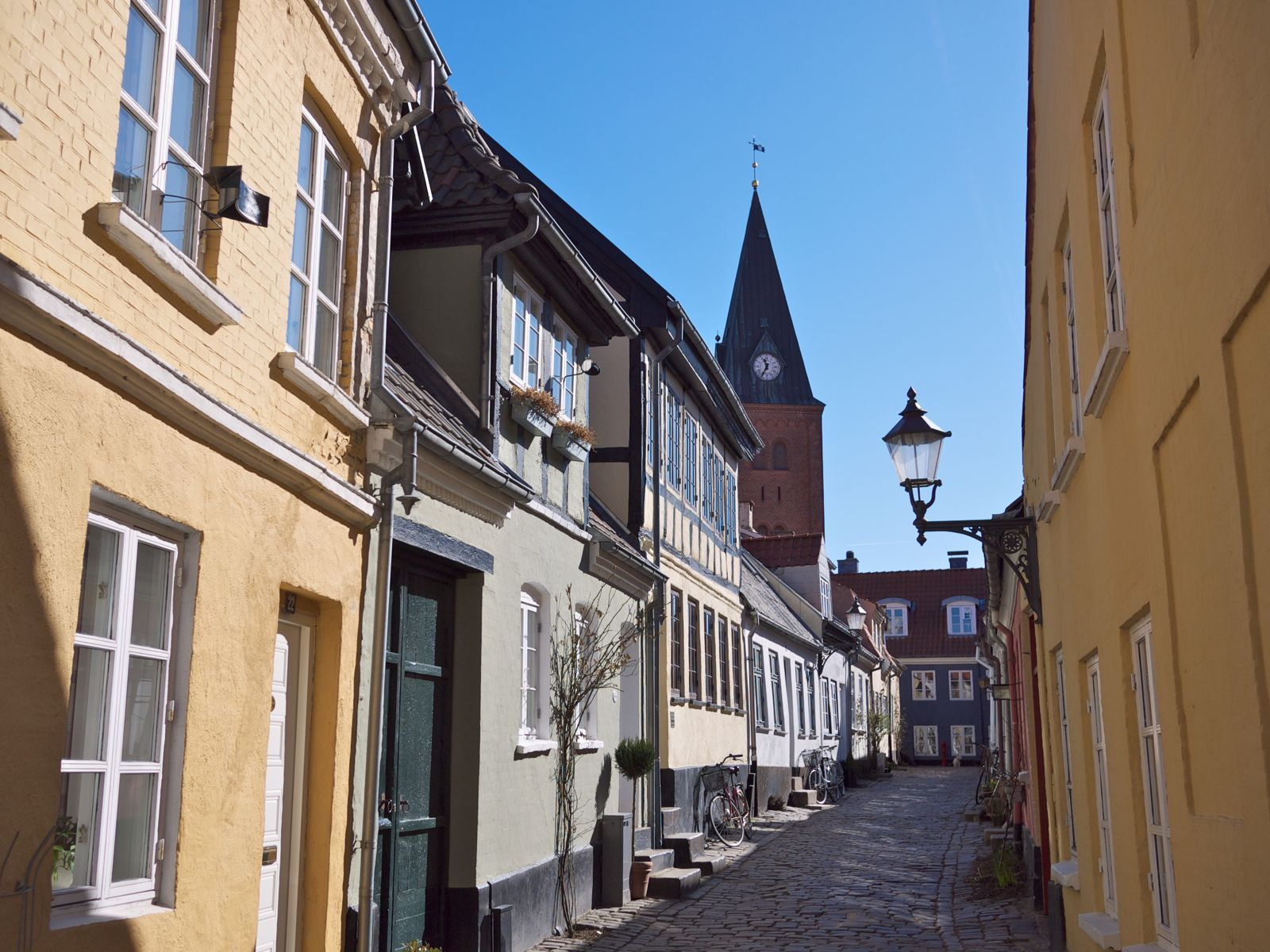
Hjelmerstald

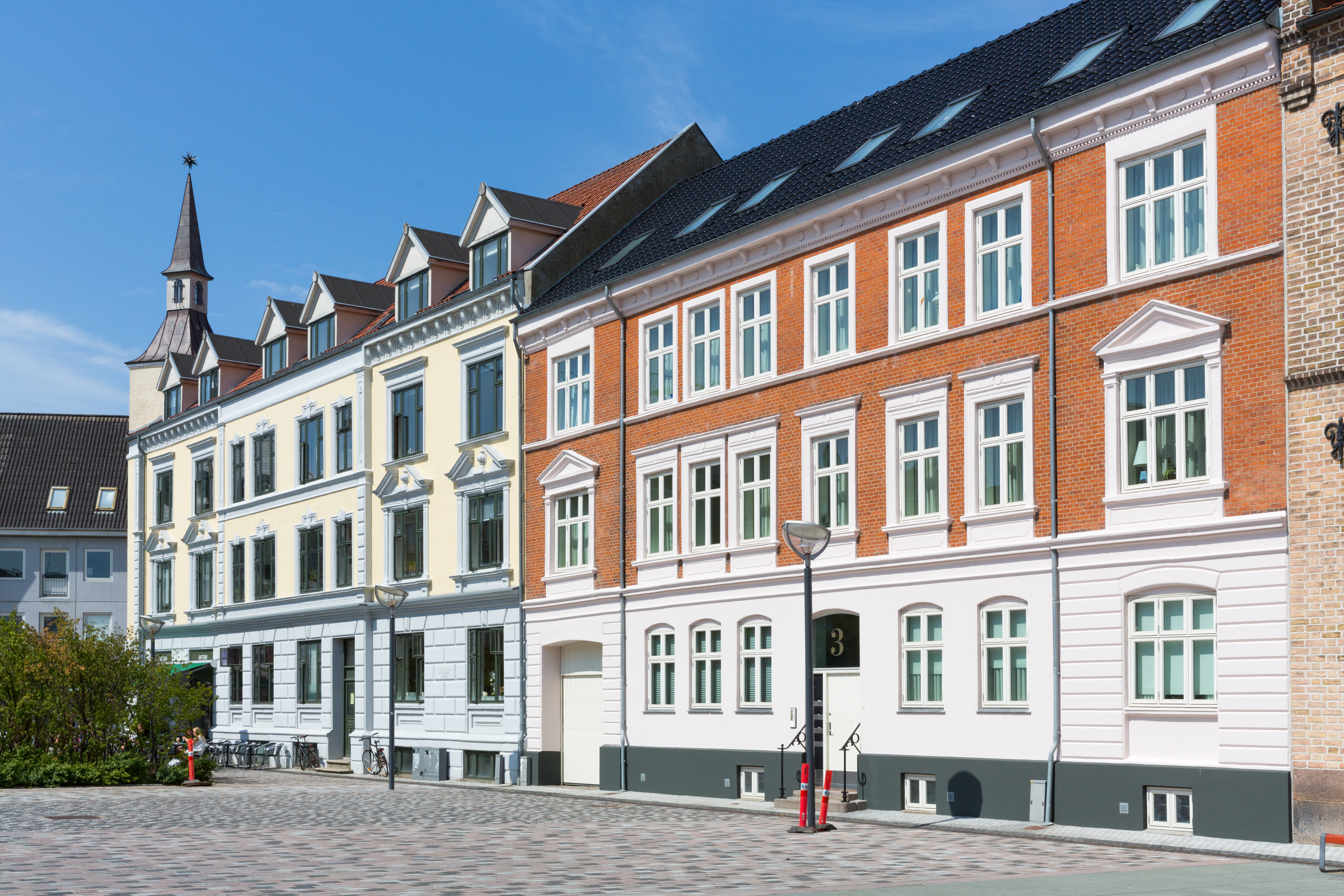
The northwestern section of Gabels Torv

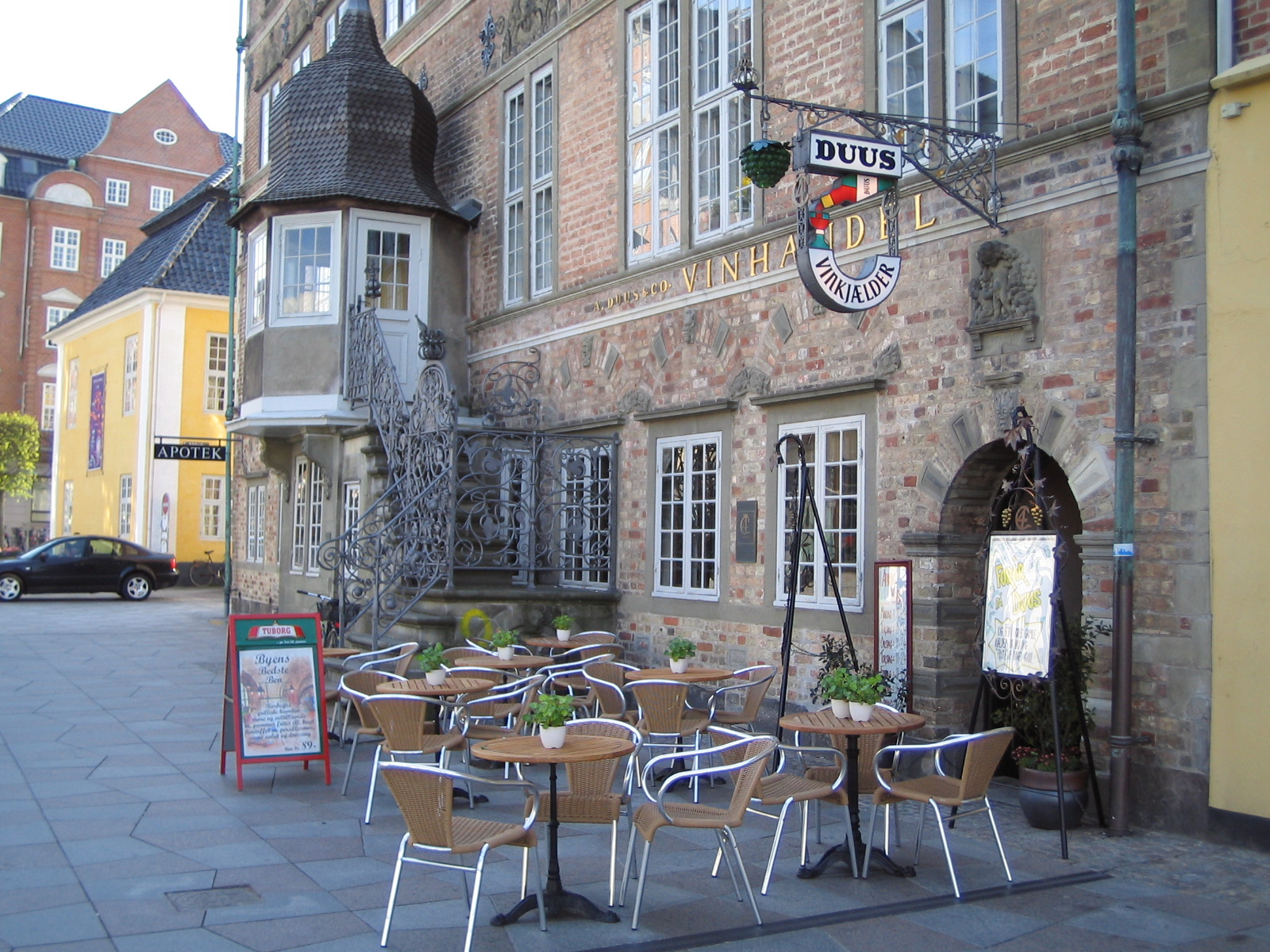
One of the old restaurants (and wine cellars)

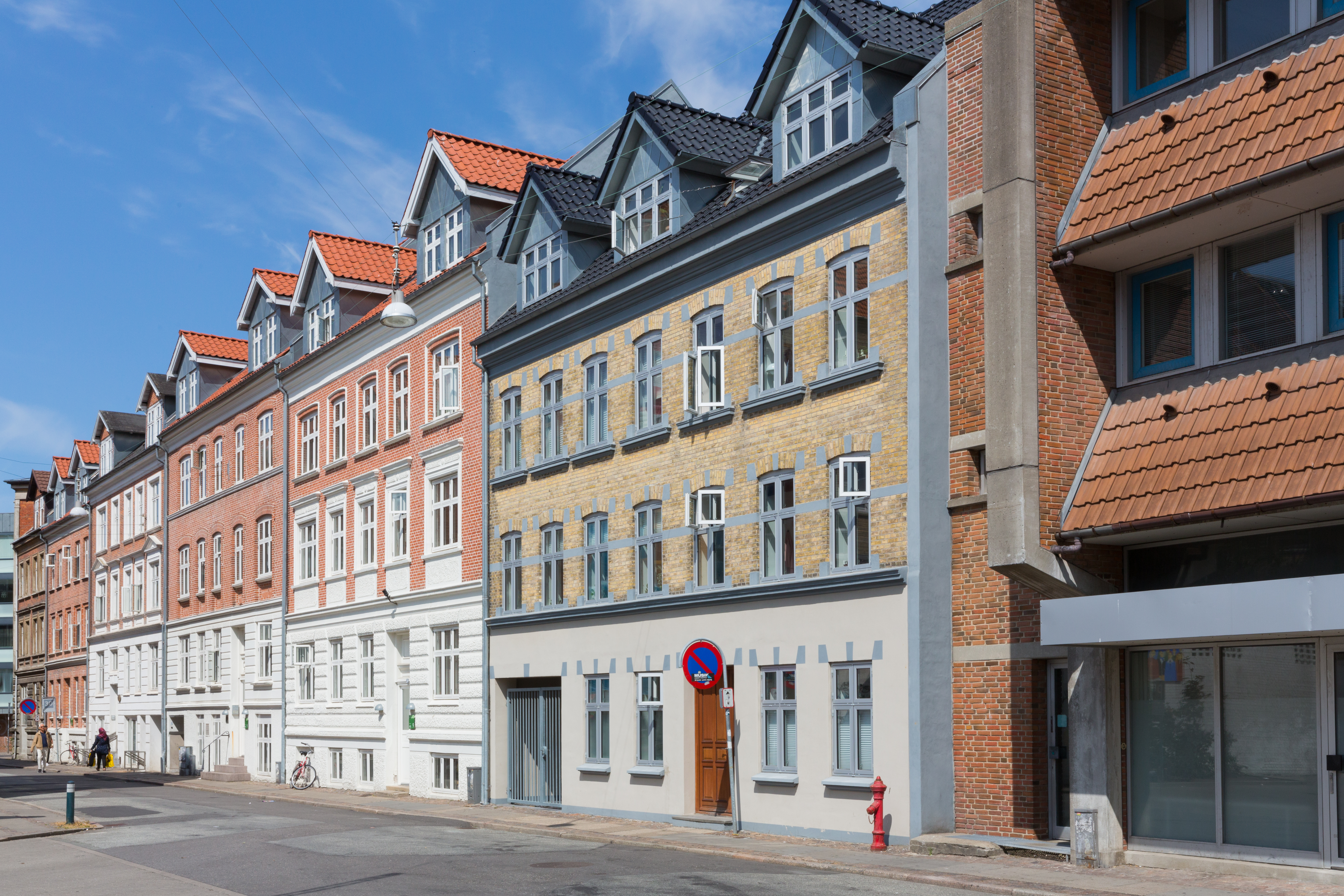
The eastern part of Korsgade

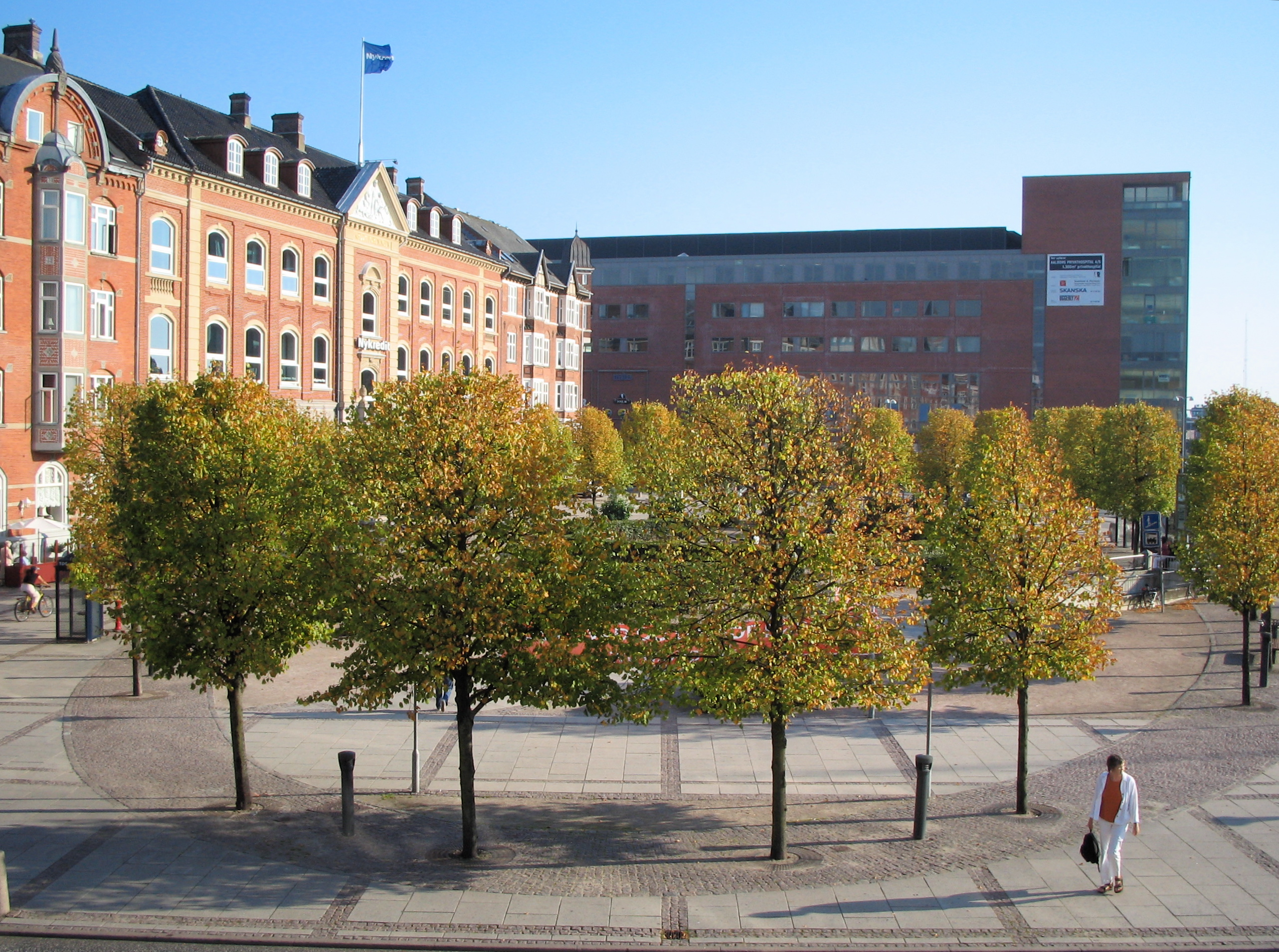
John F. Kennedy Square near the train station

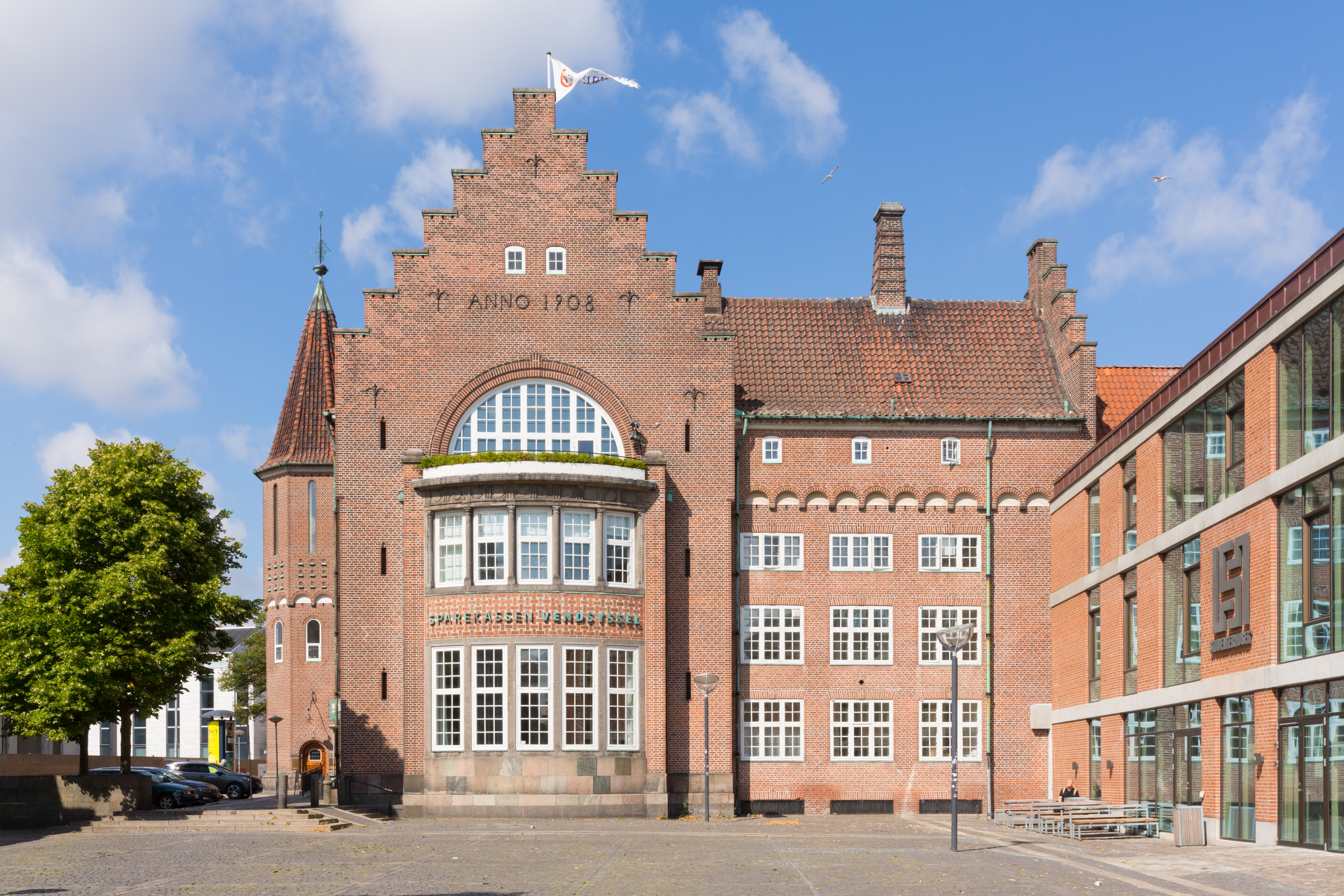
A historical building in the town centre of Aalborg, namely Aalborg's Post and Telegraph (listed by the Heritage Agency of Denmark)

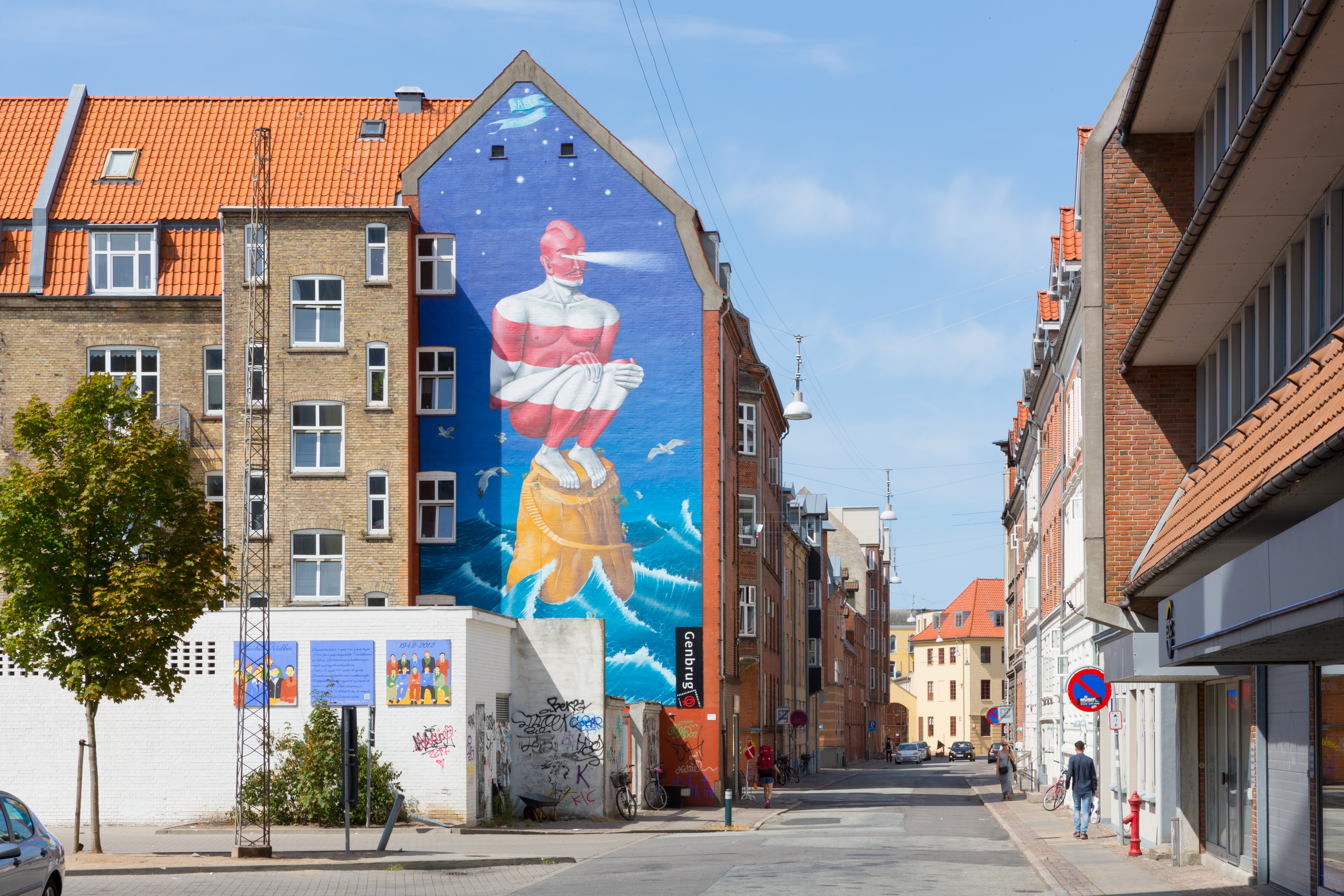
Holbergsgade 1 and Korsgade

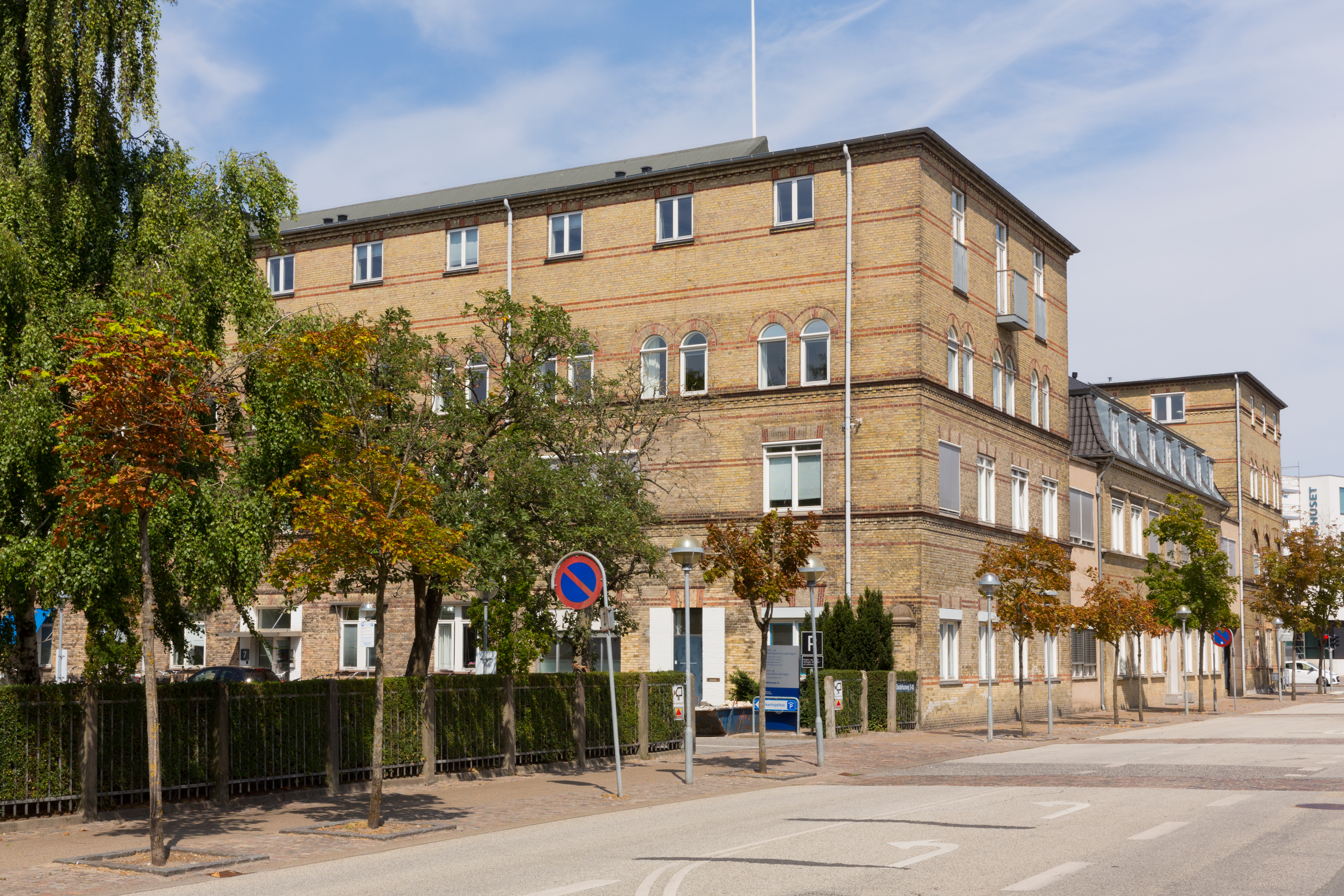
The Courthouse in Aalborg and Aalborg University's Basis compus

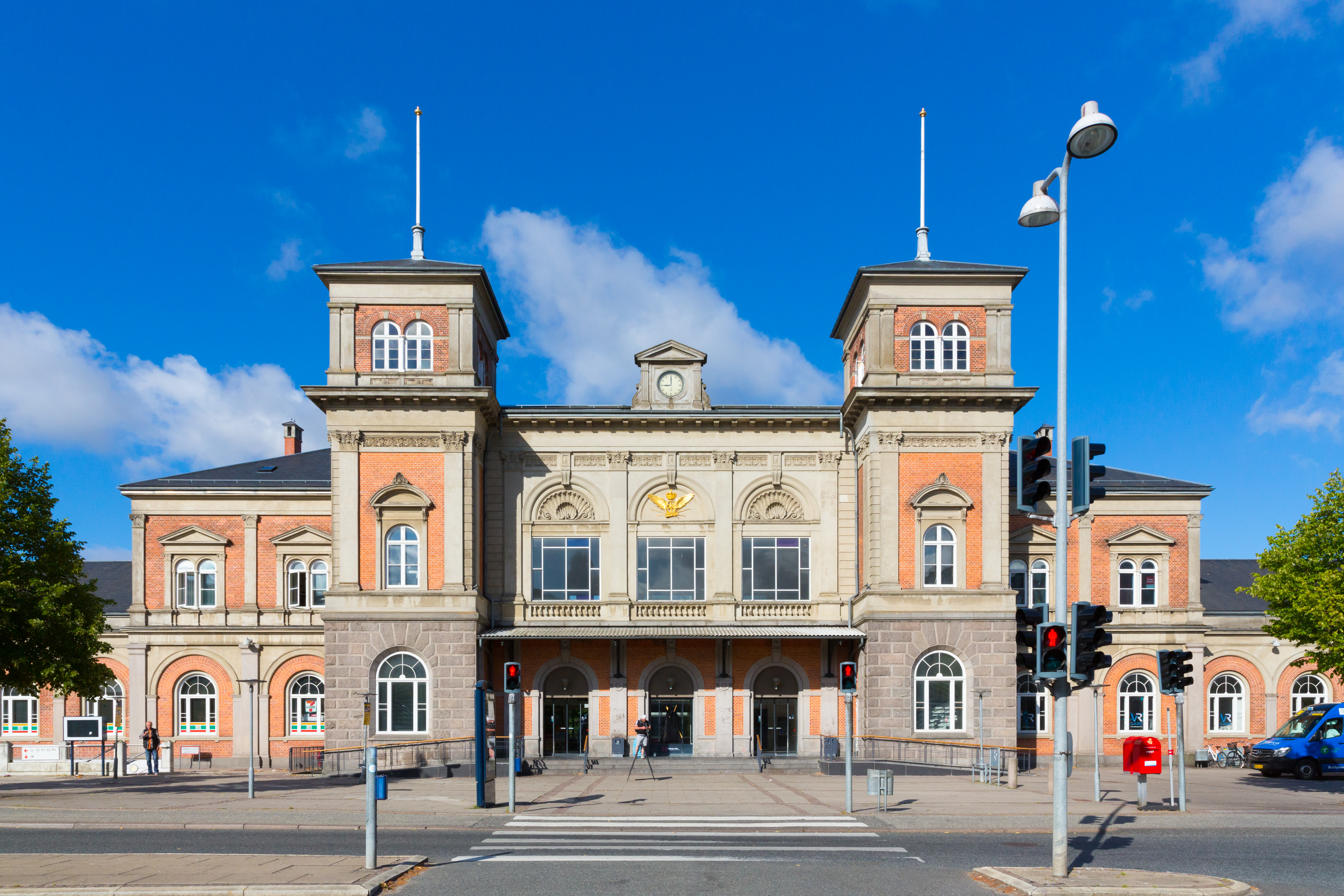
The train station in Aalborg

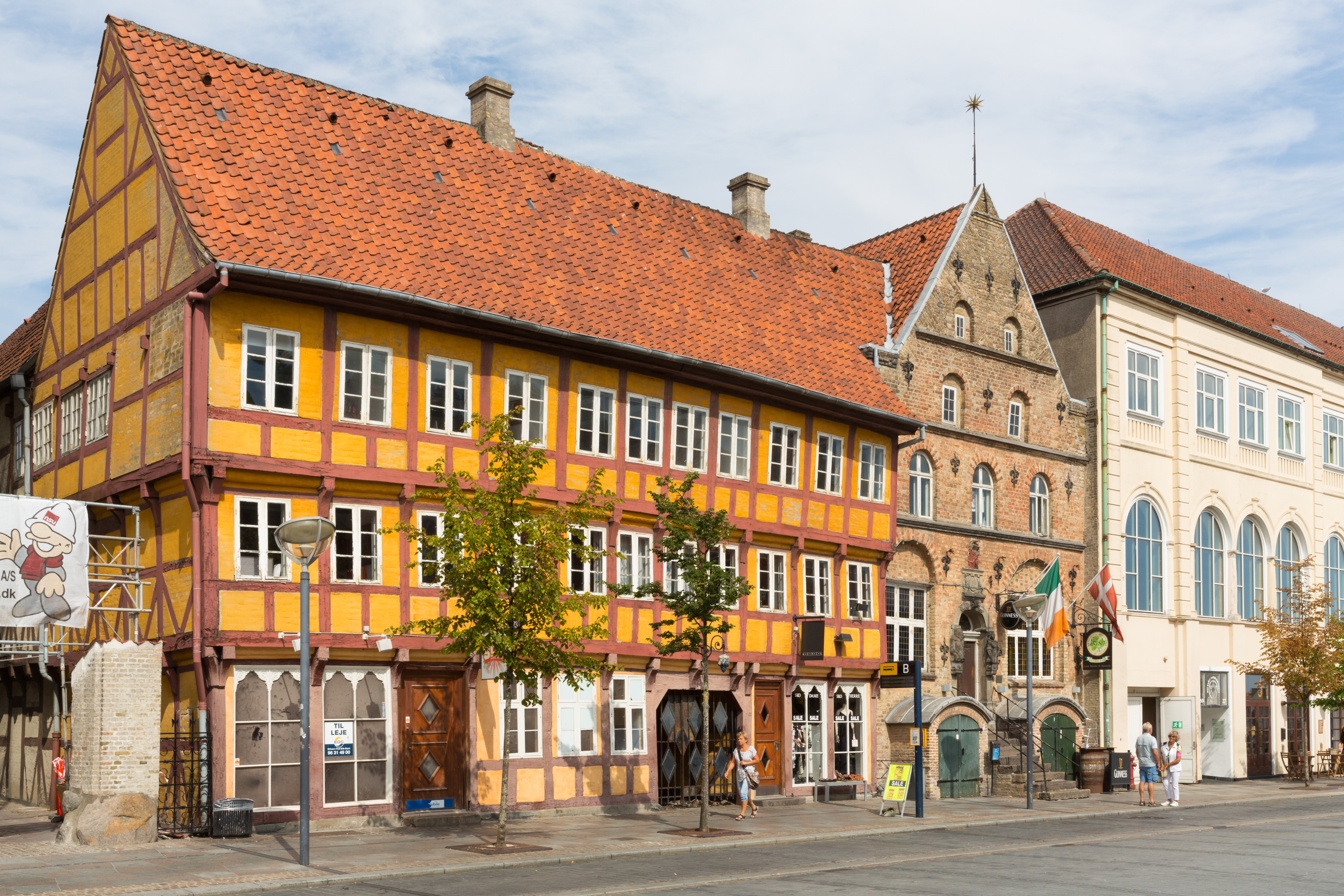
Østerågade 23 and 25

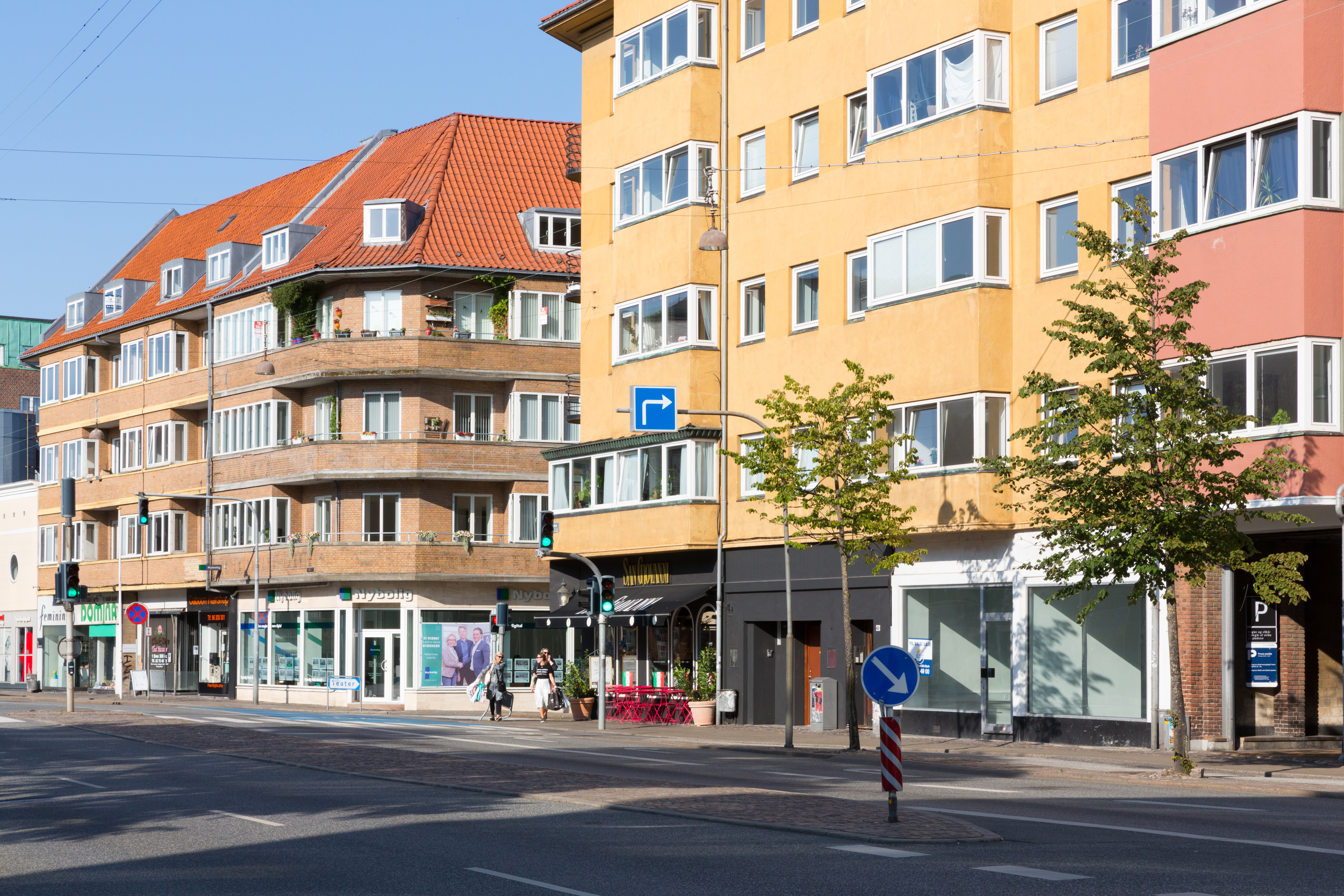
Vesterbro in Aalborg's town centre

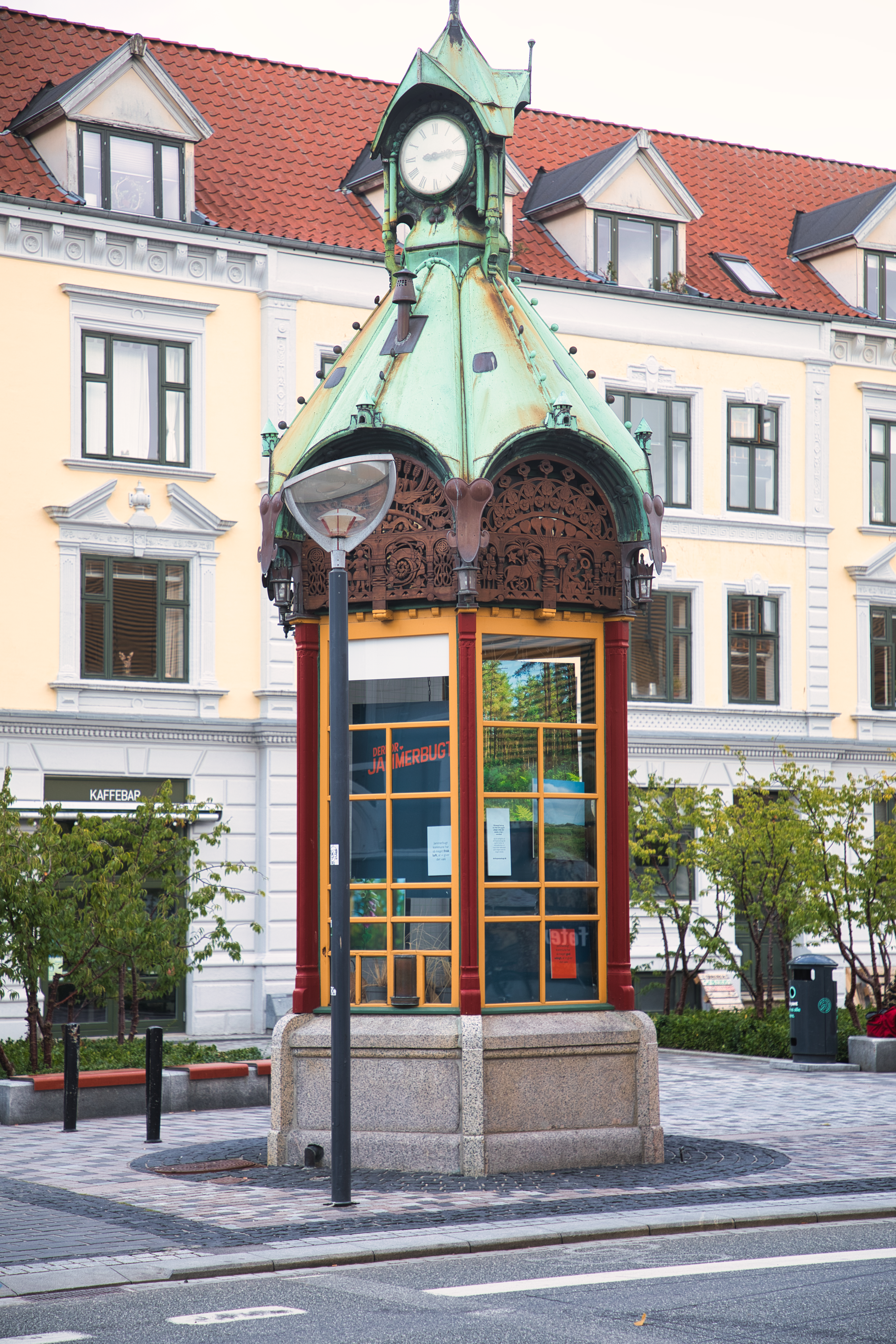
A historical kiosk in Aalborg's town centre

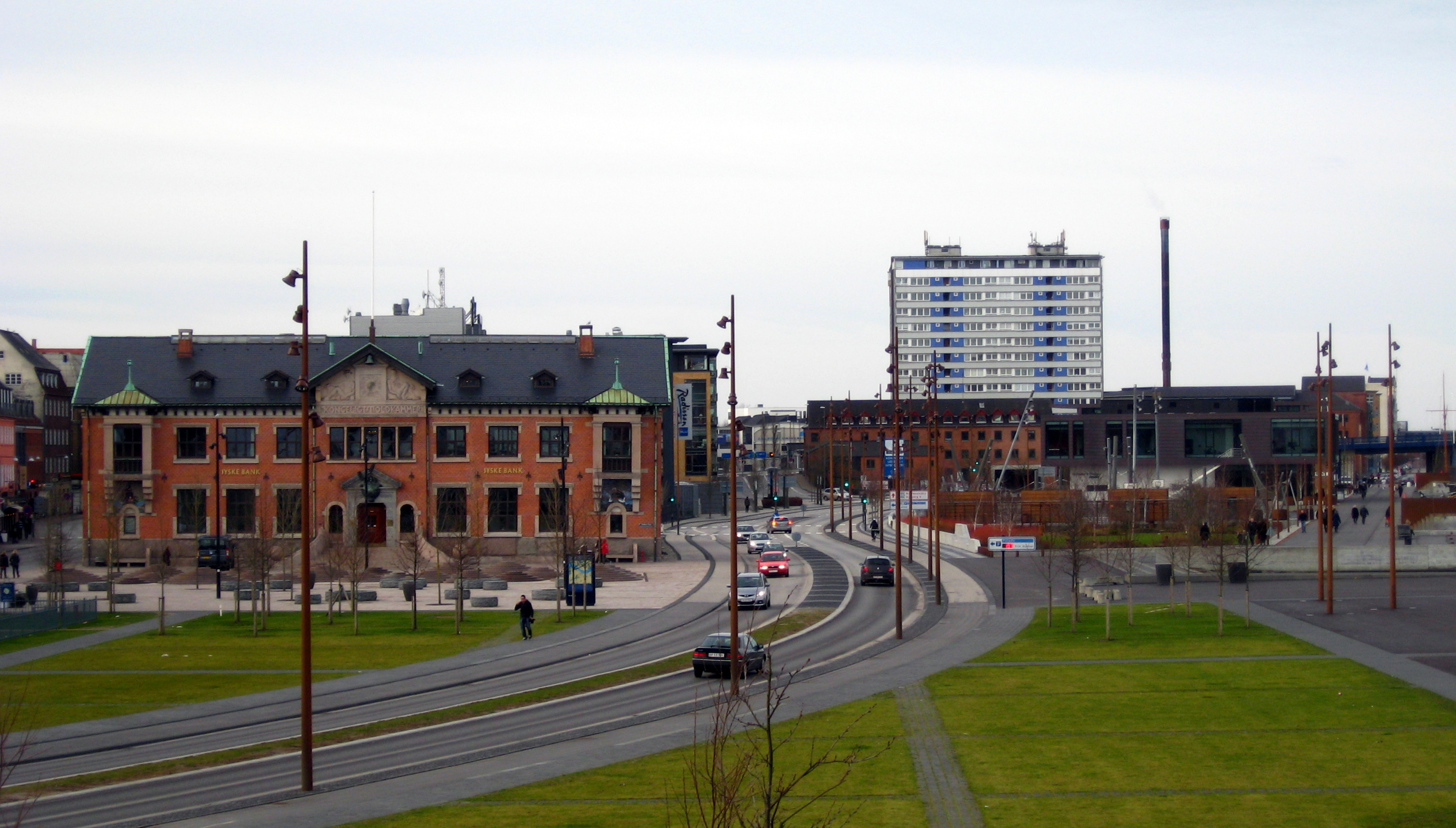
Aalborg's town centre, on the way towards the central campus of Aalborg University

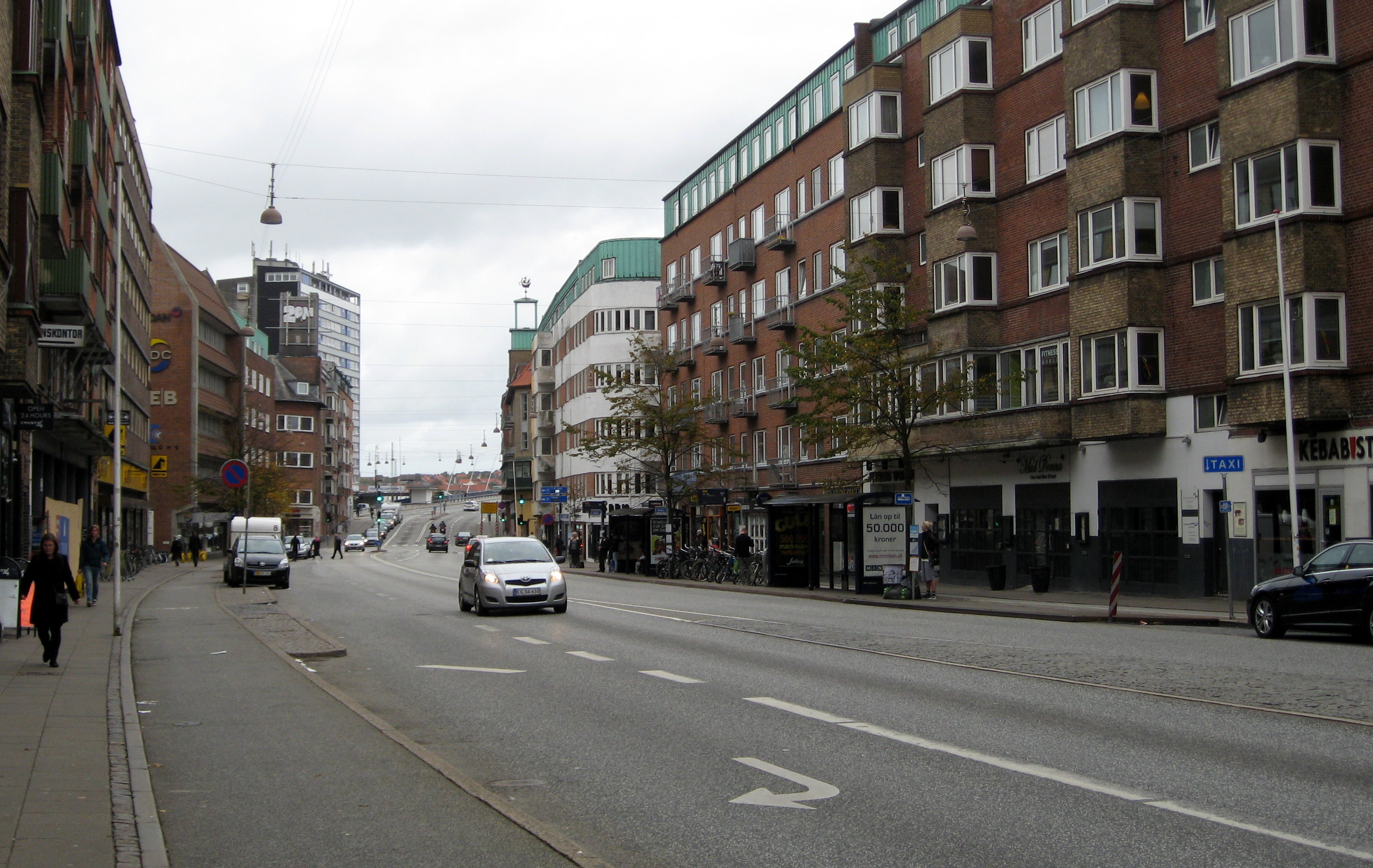
Aalborg's town centre, towards the Limfjords bridge linking the town with its satellite smaller town Nørresundby

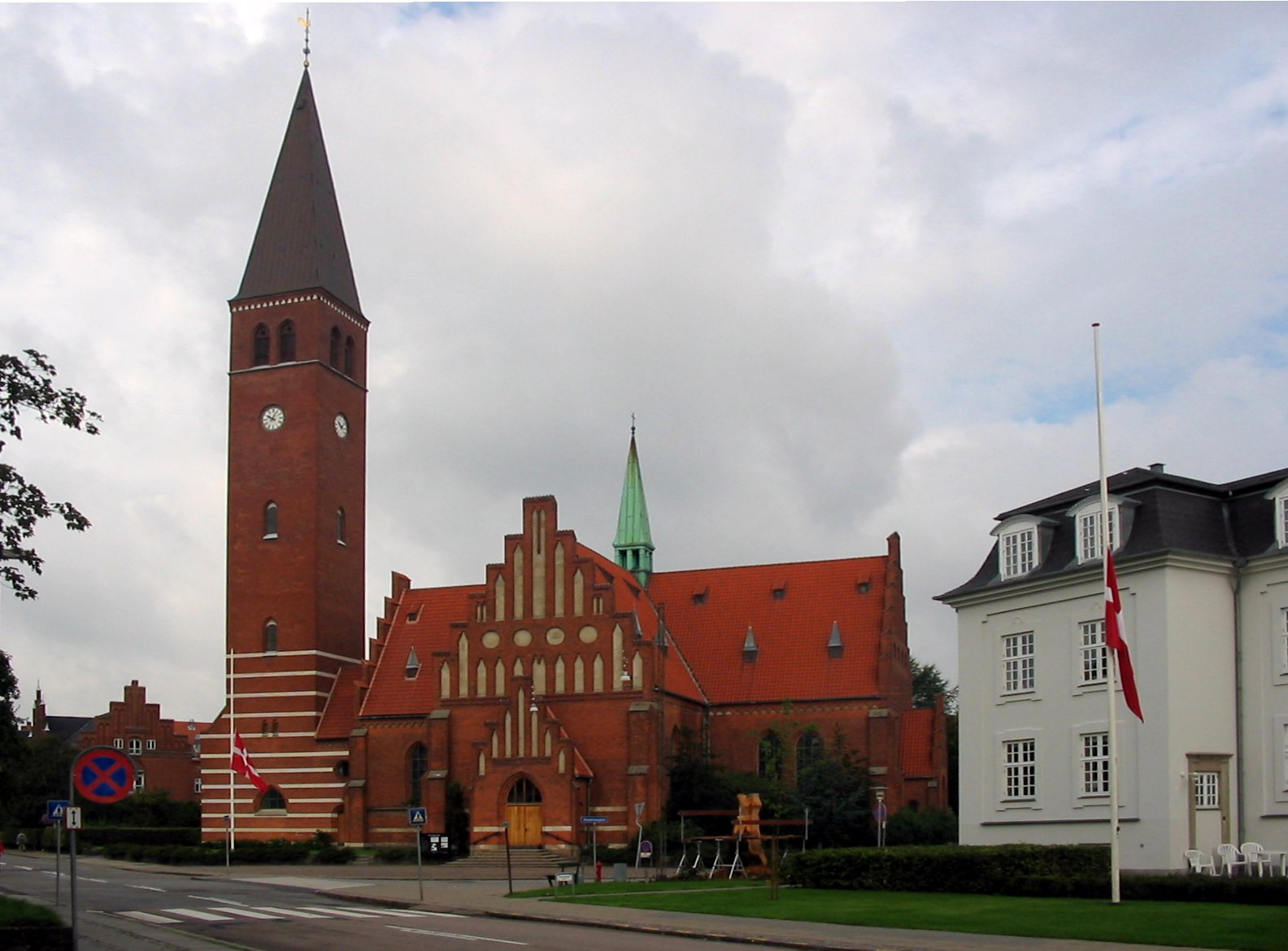
Vor Frelser Kirke in Aalborg's town centre

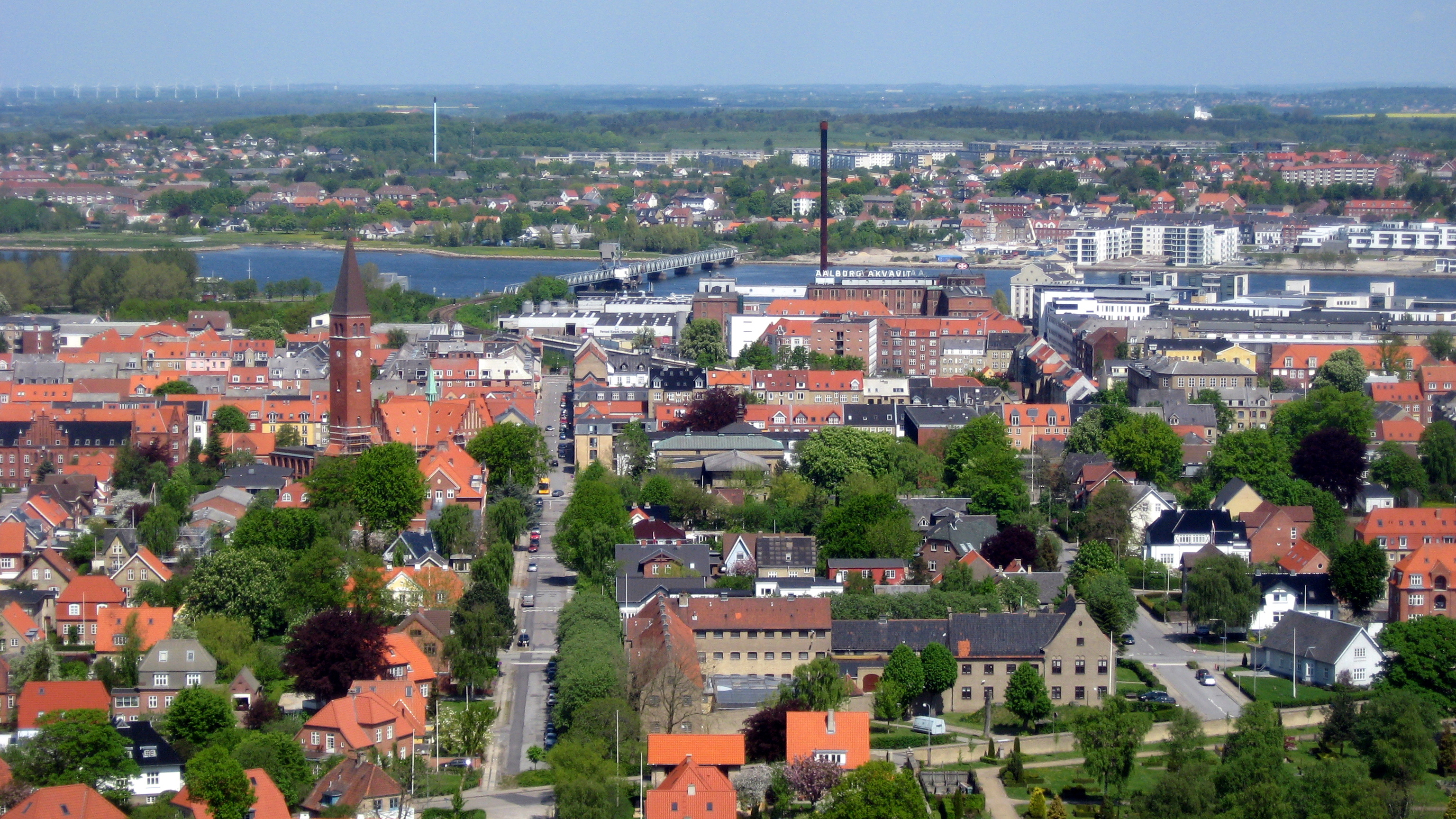
Aerial view of part of Aalborg, showcasing the area in the proximity of Vor Frelser Kirke

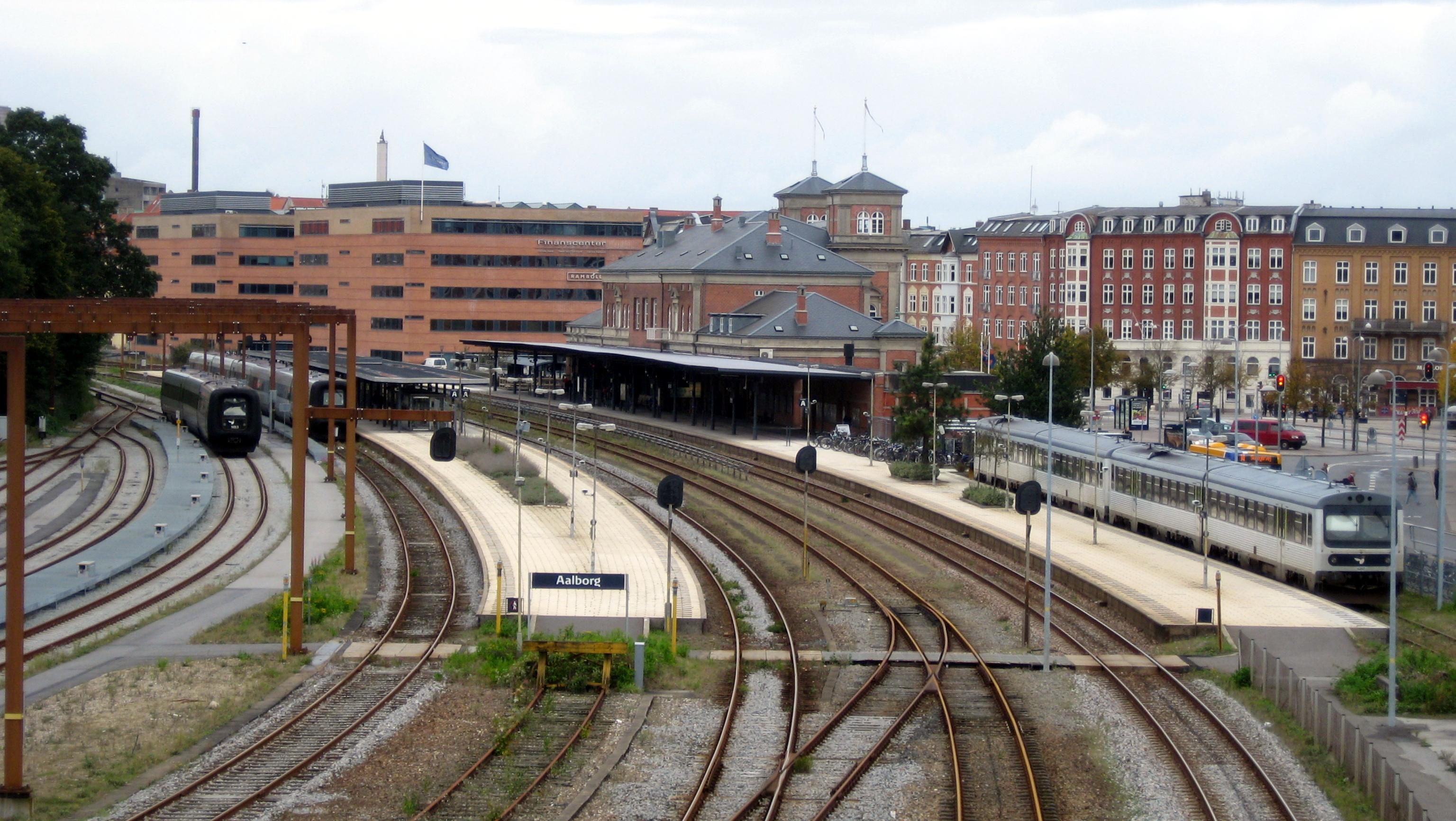
The train station in Aalborg (view towards the railways)
