= List of museums in Denmark =

This is a list of museums in Denmark.

== List of museums by visitors ==
List of museums in Denmark by visitors in 2015:

Museum	Visitors	Under 18 (not education)	Under 18 (education)	Yearly opening hours
National Museum of Denmark	1.377.494	173.998	74.934	2.191
Louisiana Museum of Modern Art	724.580	98.576	13.853	3.003
Rundetaarn	579.646	126.500	1.300	3.360
Prinsens Palais	579.331	69.520	39.790	2.191
ARoS, Aarhus Kunstmuseum	569.324	76.938	55.815	2.499
Moesgård Museum	547.844	90.811	45.150	2.400
Den Gamle By	476.050	89.276	38.584	2.487
National Gallery of Denmark	451.195	0	1.861	2.382
Royal Danish Collection	424.776	51.697	12.863	1.869
Ny Carlsberg Glyptotek	374.796	14.802	13.146	2.264
Odense Bys Museer	366.984	77.957	21.046	2.310
Rosenborgsamlingen	319.774	39.441	11.334	1.844
Frederiksborg Castle	285.344	2.4014	9.394	2.130
Det Kongelige Christiansborg	271.636		8.383	2.338
Kronborg	270.342	6.000	14.551	1.790
Arken Museum of Modern Art	259.473	17.661	16.641	2.406
Science Museums, Aarhus	256.750			2.250
Frilandsmuseet	248.178	34.745	12.259	965
Carlsberg Besøgscenter	220.000	6.500	4.500	2.440
Egeskov Slot	211.208			1.421
Østfyns Museer	202.494	16.316	9.768	2.072
Experimentarium	197.215	61.980	40.647	2.220
Ringkøbing- Skjern Museum	176.375	44.742	5.234	1.614
Museum Østjylland	173.650	34.793	5.983	1.848
Museum Sønderjylland	173.187	16.801	23.429	2.282
Designmuseum Danmark	172.459	9.362	10.460	2.050
Tycho Brahe Planetarium	170.387	54.531	13.138	3.360
Museum Sydøstdanmark	151.581	48.078	4.399	2.710
Vikingeskibsmuseet	146.891	30.438	12.383	2.331
Statens Naturhistoriske Museum	145.498	41.713	26.915	2.170
Post & Tele Museum	144.469	19.100	10.616	2.016
Kongernes Jelling	136.870	16.400	1.610	1.019
Frederiksberg Museerne	135.069	13.183	11.694	1.872
M/S museet for Søfart	134.508	28.916	2.580	2.002
Skagens Kunstmuseer	132301	13521	11301	1563
Memphis Maison	130021			4015
Nordjyllands Historiske Museum	129778	17289	11942	4562
H.C. Andersens Hus	129130	24804	10515	2005
Sydvestjyske Museer	128989	15372	12094	2097
Tøjhusmuseet	125556	18833	5865	1260
Zoologisk Museum	120995	38529	23637	2170
Museum Østjylland, Ebeltoft	114598	21275	558	960
Fiskeri- og Søfartsmuseet	113371	39830	12422	2501
Museet Ribes Vikinger	111283	12088	8586	2097
Gavnø Slot	110000	3500		1098
Den Fynske Landsby	109637	30775	5797	1358
Museet på Koldinghus	107750	16426	8619	2527
Danmark Borgcenter	107483	34314	1925	2710
Det Danske Filminstitut/ Museum og Cinematek	105507	20027	3718	3629
Amalienborg Museet Christian VIII's Palæ	105002	12256	1529	1869
Roskilde Museum	104953	14499	9412	2078
De Kulturhistoriske Museer i Holstebro	104598	26579	4461	1601
VejleMuseerne	100440	7264	8521	13365
Vejle Museum	100440	7264	8521	13365
Arbejdermuseet	99147	11761	22416	2520
Muserum	99023	14283	11319	2412
Cisternerne	93332	8192	2959	1660
Museum Horsens	90402	16976	7533	1687
Skagens Museum	90012	9162	8272	1291
Dansk Landbrugsmuseum Gl. Estrup	89723	17502	5349	1977
Gammel Estrup Herregårdsmuseet	89723	17502	5349	1977
Møntergården	88415	22378	4734	2098
Universe Science Park	87920	14639	12909	1381
Museum Vestsjælland	85723	5962	5501	1479
HDMS Jylland	85239	17753	3103	2069
Brandts	84707	14741	14026	2346
Liselund Gl. Slot	83062	10000	0	176
Vendsyssels Historiske Museum	80470	12205	5514	2555
Ordrupgaard	80286	3885	1476	1676
Nyborg Slot	77473	4184	2620	1314
Trapholt	76923	3937	6487	2368
Hjerl Hedes Frilandsmuseum	76714	23852	3365	1303
Danmarks Jernbanemuseum	73149	30901	0	2166
Marstal Søfartsmuseum	69778	4065		2304
Det Kongelige Bibliotek Bog- og Fotomuseum	69523	402	3020	2700
Kroppedal Museum	69080	1371	3177	1290
Valdemars Slot, Herregårdsmuseum	66874		2505	1190
Naturhistorisk Museum, Aarhus	66227	16721	16858	2160
Geocenter Møns Klint	64820		9200	1300
Esrum Kloster og Møllegård	64802	16201	1621	1632
Bornholms Museum	64017	8465	5017	1512
Østsjællands Museum	63771	11270	5203	1519
Langelands Museum	63699	11020	1760	3435
Historiecenter Dybbøl Banke	62568	10224	16135	1611
Johannes Larsen Museet	60255	2420	3038	1944
Andelslandsbyen Nyvang	59089			962
VikingeborgenTrelleborg	56478	6800	2783	1230
VikingeborgenTrelleborg	56478	6800	2783	1230
Kunsthal Charlottenborg	56156	3700		2028
Naturbornholm	56047	9920	19257	1535
Thorvaldsens Museum	56032	2723	9317	2190
Naturama	55365	15310	15839	1868
Mønsted Kalkgruber	55016	16205	1628	1561
Lyngvig Fyr	52714	18761	352	1502
Sønderborg Slot	52520	6176	10419	1700
Danmarks Tekniske Museum	52171	18057	8467	2254
Lemvig Museum	51749	505	1299	2221
Nordjyllands Kystmuseum	51599	7432	5248	1568
Bork Vikingehavn	49182	13762	1119	1082
Museumscenter Hanstholm	48842			1735
Fængselsmuseet	48592	7932	3428	1414
Bornholms Middelaldercenter	47489	10081	15463	697
Lemvig Museum	47051	327	1195	2221
Frøslevlejrens museum	46014	5500	4623	1848
Davids Samling	45539		3708	1951
Museet for Varde By og Omegn	44924	11076		5110
Roskilde Museum	44771	8147	3898	2078
Museum Østjylland, Randers	43212	9604	4440	1848
Helsingør Kommunes Museer	43121	4225	2168	1460
Sophienholm	42400			1620
KØS Museum of art in public spaces	40553	557	5155	2035
Middelaldercentret, Nykøbing Falster	40461	20000	4500	950
Dansk Jagt- og Skovbrugsmuseum	40272	12786	2016	2005
Museum Jorn	40051	3165	6072	1866
Danmarks Keramikmuseum Grimmerhus	40000	648	0	1395
Nivaagaards Malerisamling	40000	439	1400	2496
Randers Kunstmuseum	39691	8996	5845	2159
Industrimuseet	39421	7144	12131	1910
Orlogsmuseet Søkvæsthuset	38714	4600	2873	1260
Bornholms Kunstmuseum	38578	3172	3415	1400
Kunsthal Aarhus	38500			1762
Københavns Museum	37306	4782	4096	1973
Koldkrigsmuseum Stevnsfort	36238	5260	2402	1519
Kunstcentret Silkeborg Bad	35957	1223	2907	2020
Furesø Museer	35449	2507	6340	1638
Glasmuseet, Ebeltoft	35380	5188	506	2122
Fur Fossiler	34877	2980	3823	1241
Dansk Jødisk Museum	34807	678	2657	1389
Svendborg Museum	34300	1703	2819	1490
Lindholm Høje	33850	4589	3569	2230
Kvindemuseet i Danmark	33632	1069	3873	2364
Vikingemuseet Ladby	33213	5362	2614	2072
Energimuseet	32598	6877	11416	1784
Den Frie Udstilling	32535	453	162	1872
Spøttrup Middelalderborg	31977	8697	980	1417
Anchers Hus	31752	3486	2908	1563
Ribe Kunstmuseum	31728	759	1826	1717
Lille Vildmosecentret	31389	3531	2565	1350
Karen Blixen-Museet Rungstedlund	31153	1141	1409	1679
Silkeborg Kulturhistoriske Museum	30849	4099	5576	1429
Vikingecenter Fyrkat	30089	4232	1612	1064
Danmarks Saltcenter, Mariager	30000	10000	1000	2220
Kommandørgården	28760	3500	0	1071
Fiskeriets Hus	27503	7794	37	2335
HEART Herning Museum of Contemporary Art	27380	2132	2668	2135
Kulturhistorie Tønder	27186	1657	2988	2282
Bunkermuseet, Hirtshals	26200	260	280	1400
Museerne i Fredericia	26028	2823	3854	816
Den Hirschsprungske Samling	25879	799	5780	1565
Danmarks Flymuseum	25572	2480	275	1535
Museum Lolland Falster	25385	2220	3054	1584
Danmarks Samlermuseum	25198	1704		2023
Politihistorisk Museum	25131			780
Danmarks Mediemuseum	24698	0	0	2310
Geologisk Museum	24503	3184	3278	1860
Museum Skanderborg	24374	3271	3679	1170
Økomuseum Samsø	24367	1028	1755	1180
Fåborg Museum	24130	1070	1347	1845
Fuglsang Kunstmuseum	24088	1172	1577	1664
Museum Mors	24053	4712	1504	2489
Medicinsk Museion	23664	4359	292	832
Limfjordsmuseet	23585	1884	1995	924
Sporvejsmuseet Skjoldnæsholm	23500			
Cirkusmuseet	23126	7047	6300	1240
Aalborg Historical Museum	22688	2861	3061	2137
Mosbjerg	22508	9480	2460	2555
Aalborg Søfarts- og Marinemuseum	22206	4113	1265	2493
Favergården	21756	2812	756	1506
Viborg Museum	21543	2451	5346	1371
Industrimuseet Frederiks Værk	21517	2059	527	800
Museet for Religiøs Kunst	21483	712	1125	1625
Hjorths Fabrik Bornholms Keramikmuseum	21447	2085	58	1436
Horsens Historiske Museum	21435	6768	650	1687
Museet for Samtidskunst	21115	257	2015	1184
Landbrugsmuseet på Melstedgård	20831	4069	880	708
Tidens Samling Kulturmaskinen	20630	2335	1954	1730
Billund Museum	20625	5705	851	1440
Storm P. Museet	20620	4104	5526	1872
Viborg Museum	20600	2338	5346	1371
Køge Museum	20586	9246	1120	1041
Horsens Kunstmuseum	20375	2276	3455	1657
Middelfart Museum	20356	1950	1568	2046
Øhavsmuseet	20276	3686	509	1798
Museum Nordsjælland	20047	2429	2017	1025
Hovedgården	20004	3015	4118	1429
C.H. Pedersen og E. Alfelts Museum	19897			2072
Skagen By- og Egnsmuseum	19616	2607	2187	1568
Aalborg Defence and Garrison Museum	19593	6450	900	1485
Greve Museum	19085	2554	3776	2885
Hjemmeværnsmuseet	19000	1500		2400
Museum Midtjylland	18753	2204	1676	1565
Voergård Slot	18258	2202		660
Museumsgården Karensminde	18164	5389	362	936
Museum Ovartaci	18130		1200	2050
Vendsyssels Historiske Museum	18029	856	2461	1260
Øregaard Museum	17968			884
Teatermuseet	17801	2070	230	1400
Brede Værk	17642	2100	1265	798
Cathrineminde Teglværk	17543	560	1014	1296
Vadehavscentret Vester Vedsted	17528	200	7000	540
Bornholms Museum	17437	1792	4041	1512
Thingbæk Kalkminer Bundgaards Museum Gravlev	17400			1200
Sorø Kunstmuseum	17020	461	3149	1850
Vendsyssel Kunstmuseum	16797	537	2510	1608
Rosenholm Slot	16500	5500	200	250
Museet for Korsør og Omegn	16500	2000	1500	1953
Museet for Thy og Vester Hanherred	16394	1173	2409	1261
Dybbøl Mølle	16331	4221	1820	1017
Vesthimmerlands Museum	16238	1633	3088	1764
Holbæk Museum	16075	1016	406	1473
Højriis Gods	15993			440
Kunstmuseet Brundlund Slot	15977	506	2831	1715
Museum Østjylland, Grenå	15840	3914	985	1080
Ringkøbing Museum	15702	3940	439	1614
Bundsbæk Mølle	15557	1039	1565	393
Søby Brunkulsmuseum	15249	587		1450
Galleri Galschiøt	15233			2200
Museum Amager	15133	2633	2728	444
Carl Nielsen Museet	15104	0	0	924
Tirpitz Museum	15099	4346		1126
Lützhøfs Købmandsgård	15021	2323	435	1723
Kalundborg Museum	14955	1309	483	1320
Esbjerg Kunstmuseum	14929	1635	4316	2160
Vejen Kunstmuseum	14825	477	4526	1872
Jysk Automobilmuseum	14635			1127
Hempel Glasmuseum	14622	1175		987
Graabrødrekloster Museum	14611	0	0	2035
Rudersdal Museer	14503	3540	2873	1390
Holstebro Museum	14489	117	202	1601
Holstebro Kunstmuseum	14489	1399	2423	1502
Museet i Hjemsted Oldtidspark	14459	225	0	1132
Give-Egnens Museum	14389	3267	1534	1637
Bangsbomuseet	14258	1557	1156	1528
Ærø Museum	14096	1759	443	2202
J. F. Willumsens Museum	13845	1083	2809	2047
Museet på Sønderskov	13818	1976	1264	1380
Kirsten Kjærs Museum	13789	1200	750	1250
Stevns Museum	13583	2484	176	1519
Jægerspris Slot	13502			910
Humlemagasinet	13500	450		1020
Diesel House	13441			
Strandingsmuseum St. George	13395	2610	894	1302
Glud Museum	13287	2274	1616	1400
Esbjerg Museum	13283	1913	3269	1812
Læsø Museum	13155	1163	655	920
Fahl Kro	13037	3633	155	944
Heerup museum Rødovregård	12955	826	4780	1500
Gasmuseet	12894	2000	3000	1370
Krydsfelt Skive	12763	2510	3610	1262
Geomuseum Faxe	12624	3311	2625	1226
Ballerup Museum Lindbjerggård	12548	1774	1031	1060
Strøjer Samlingen	12369	603	720	150
Skovgaard Museet	12313	747	1416	1560
Sorø Museum	12184	1066	1616	637
Skanderborg Museum	12112	1046	2373	1170
Lumby Møllegård	12000	2000	200	45
Grønningen	12000			224
Frederikshavn kunstmuseum og Exlibris samling	11927	127		1560
Rudolph Tegners museum	11896	1066		1311
Musikmuseet	11529	1400	3266	1896
Skagen Bunker Museum	11280	2500	1325	940
Frederikssund Museum	11215	2389	1605	1260
Bunkermuseet	11028	2868	1580	1092
Amagermuseet	10947	2258	1801	444
Flyndersø Mølle	10757	0	0	2412
Arkæologi Haderslev	10684	1746	4079	1261
Drachmanns Hus	10537	873	121	1015
Jenle, Nanna og Jeppe Åkjærs Kunstnerhjem	10481	421	233	1120
Struer Museum	10435	468	778	1424
Varde Museum	10313	2182		1814
Frilandsmuseet i Maribo	10281	1133	2110	841
Kaj Munks Præstegård	10216	490	267	765
Museerne i Brønderslev Kommune	10181	406	1322	555
Borgmestergården	9797	1538	740	1280
Vesthimmerlands Museum	9346	345	2452	1764
Kongernes Lapidarium i Christian 4.s Bryghus	9326		86	2338
Malergården	9231	515	0	720
Dronninglund Kunstcenter	9208	267	109	1120
Odsherreds Museum	8897	153	1180	1479
Kastrupgårdsamlingen	8837	264	574	987
Abelines Gaard	8773	1698	237	942
Herregården Hessel Hvalpsund	8674	1202	84	722
Daugbjerg Kalkgruber	8500	5500	3000	850
Skovhuset ved Søndersø	8500		411	716
Bakkehuset	8440	520	3040	1560
Den Gamle Købmandshandel	8119	625	0	1584
Møstings Hus	8042	335	149	1747
Rav-Museet	7894	1409		1142
Glyngøre Kulturstation	7685	0	2881	668
Textilforum	7622	371	670	1432
Naturhistorie og Palæontologi	7551	915	1250	1645
Den Historiske Miniby	7539	2224		976
Hvolris Jernalderlandsby	7491		1839	1100
Håndværksmuseet	7460	0	0	1723
Fanø Kunstmuseum	7443	496	191	574
Hals Museum, Hals Skanse	7424	1356	88	694
Strandfogedgården Rubjerg	7385	1021	163	380
Nykøbing Sj. Psykiatriske Museum	7273	1025	337	798
Tadre Mølle Museum	7261	0	317	445
Oluf Høst Museet	6987			782
Cirkusmuseet Rold	6932	1558	1857	700
Egnssamlingen, Saltum	6900	200	160	1024
Nymindegab Museum	6900	1938		1422
Stenaldercentret Ertebølle	6892	1288	636	708
Øm Kloster Museum	6843	907	648	1170
Munkeruphus	6801			924
Skt. Laurentius	6772	1424	597	672
Klosterlund Museum	6745	1000	954	1565
Møns Museum	6560	2791	153	1370
Frederikssund VIkingeboplads Forsøgscenter	6500	4700	1800	2920
Boldrup Museum	6471	1692	1585	4562
Thisted Museum	6464	219	1703	1261
Højer Mølle	6363	1171	470	1188
Hirtshals Museum	6348	588	150	1000
Ehlers Lertøjssamling	6312	392	0	1368
Christiansø Museum	6193	1126	593	800
Herregårdsmuseet, Selsø Slot	6174	1005	0	644
Odsherreds kunstmuseum	6110	486	277	1350
Ringsted Museum	6077	111	219	780
Papirmuseet Bikuben	6010	901	905	930
Danmarks Rockmuseum	6000	0	0	0
Skælskør Bymuseum	5861	626	66	349
Slagelse Museum	5821	680	977	711
Bruunshaab gl. Papfabrik	5794	1766		750
Strandgården	5715	615	368	435
Spillemands- Jagt og Skovbrugsmuseet i Rebuild	5531	674	180	1300
Hørsholm Egns Museum	5441	125	1016	780
Dansk Sygeplejehistorisk Museum	5419	529	73	1410
Skibene på Holmen	5360	600	600	234
Sæby Museum og Sæbygård Slot	5352	400	325	1026
Museumsgården	5312	1130	0	648
Heltborg museum og Sydthy Kunst-og Kulturcenter	5166	630	218	743
Vildmosemuseet	5113	99	461	555
Hellebæk-Ålsgårde museum og Hammermøllen	5000		100	2000
Helligåndshuset Næstved Museum	4868	357	990	1336
Blicheregnens Museum	4835	183	553	1006
Kulturhistorie Aabenraa	4779	1831		1080
Museum Vestfyn	4762	193	17	1230
Jens Søndergårds Museum	4698	178	104	1299
Revymuseet	4635	32	20	1560
Odsherred Brandmuseum	4600			500
Forsvarsmuseet på Bornholm	4507			700
Esbjerg Vandtårn	4423	1371	239	840
Museet Holmen	4380	17	21	512
Erichsens Gård	4302	519	38	276
Gudhjem Museum Gudhjem Station	4148			676
Vorupør Museum	4004	243	488	876
Skovsgaard Mølle Bageri Museum	4000			350
Fyrhistorisk Museum	3944	831	152	720
Fjerritslev Bryggeri- og Egnsmuseum	3900	850	300	500
Danmarks Traktormuseum	3790	662		736
Danmarks Fotomuseum	3746	400	1300	1460
Boderne Næstved Museum	3632	121	176	1336
Victor Petersens Willumsen-Samling	3531			1680
Sundbysamlingerne	3527	97	0	432
Oldemorstoft Bov	3495	1076	50	1008
Godthaab Hammerværk	3479	156	406	430
Hørvævsmuseet på Krengerup	3464			450
Fanø Skibsfarts-og Dragtsamling	3281	517		1118
Genforenings- og Grænsemuseet	3256			
Vester Palsgaard Skovmuseum	3239	723	32	1115
Jagt,- og Skovbrugsmuseet på Dorf	3235	200	727	148
Varde Artillerimuseum	2985	918		1092
Stiftsmuseet Maribo	2880	167	453	790
Hannes Hus	2876	182	73	180
Museet på Gl. Rye Mølle	2838	703	209	1170
Køng Museum	2788	100	35	244
Mariager Museum	2768	476	39	435
Æbelholt KLoster	2739	613	200	780
Folkemuseet I Hillerød	2648	581	484	1025
Bramming Egnsmuseum	2632	200	408	450
Falsters Minder	2590	175	491	1584
Kongeåmuseet	2500	75	340	280
Skjern Vindmølle	2452	0	88	124
Slagterimuseet i Roskilde	2450	0	0	270
Souvenariet	2433			1120
Uldum Mølle	2410	714		1066
Skoda Museum Glamsbjerg	2400			516
Den Kongelige Livgarde	2400		600	
Domkirkemuseet	2349	0	2349	1
Holbo Herreds Kulturhistoriske Centre	2340	145	99	670
Skanderborg Bunkerne	2286	615	154	1170
Hestebedgård	2254		120	262
Danmarks Lodsmuseum	2102	208	686	384
Tåsinge Skipperhjem og Folkemindesamling	2101	284	0	430
Ringsted Radio Museum	2100			620
Danmarks Sukkermuseum	2100	200	100	505
Nexø Museum	2095	224	156	518
Sønderjysk Skolemuseum	2029	133	475	450
Dragør Museum	2009	160	241	372
Jacob Michelsens Gård	1965	340		190
Hobro Museum	1889	151	16	660
Try Museum	1833	107	134	512
Danmarks Cykelmuseum	1810	225		889
Slesvigske Vognsamling	1807	167	178	804
Det gamle hus/Skibshallerne	1791	111	16	470
Drøhses Hus	1753	39	150	1307
Hjortsvang Museum	1750	150		600
Ølgod Museum	1733	283		5110
Dejbjerg Jernalder	1662	428	429	220
Lejre Museum	1654	216	211	120
Den Holbergske Stiftelse, Tersløsegaard	1622	1622	0	200
Nordby Museum	1584	235		380
Reventlow-Museet	1515	120	0	439
Brødremenighedens Museum Enkehuset	1508	30	28	858
Spejdermusset	1429	715		339
Besættelsesudstillingen	1419	253	270	30
Krudttårnet	1345	0	0	175
Haslev Museum	1326	215	0	306
Lystfartøjsmuseet	1304	219	0	660
Veterinærhistorisk Museum	1250			300
Mekanisk Museum Sønderjylland	1208	300	50	1015
Løkken Museum	1158	77	130	390
Elværket	1144	23	50	395
Nivaagaard Teglværks Ringovn	1109	52	4	130
Hadsund Egns Museum	1103	155	115	1095
Grindsted Museum	1042	63	219	1440
Orø museum	1036	99	20	180
Hauch's Physiske Cabinet	991	36	319	84
Bank- og Sparekassemuseet	978			140
E Bindstouw i Lysgård	943	113		378
Nordfyns Museum	925	300		833
Gudenådalens Museum	896		121	270
MuseRum Arkæologisk Afd.	875	96	25	100
Reersø Museum	815	99		70
Poul La Cour Museet	809	30	239	390
Augustenborg Slot	793	0		50
Blichermuseum på Herningsholm	790	80	20	330
Horne Lands Folkemindesamling	760	18	0	50
Grundtvigs Mindestuer i Udby	753	48		60
Sundsøre Pakhus	675	185		1520
Apotekersamlingen Jens Bangs Stenhus	649	0	0	73
Fiskerhuset i Agger	598	81		138
Skjern Å Museet	551	0	160	0
Flakkebjerg Skolemuseum	512	0	277	222
Otterup Museum	447	30		100
Gåsemandens Gaard	403	235	30	102
Hattemagerhuset i Tarm	366	141	0	78
Haderup Museum	357	30		36
Thorvaldsen-Samlingen på Nysø	352	19	0	233
Johannes Jørgensens Hus	310			133
Ferskvandsmuseet	295	0	295	1170
Brødrene Gram Museum	288	7	0	75
Them Fortidssamling	168		40	208
Skjoldborgs Barndomshjem	162	0		93
Annine Michelsens Mindestuer	89	0	0	13
Mølsted Museum	75	7	0	0
Skjern Reberbane	45	0	25	0
Skærbæk	0	0	0	0
Kunstmuseet i Tønder	0	0	0	2282

== By region ==
=== Capital region ===
- Æbelholt Abbey
- Esrum Abbey
- Bornholm Museum
- Bornholm Art Museum
- Bornholm Railway Museum
- NaturBornholm
- Nexø Museum
- Oluf Høst Museum

=== Central Denmark ===
- Lemvig Museum
- Four Boxes Gallery
- Skovgaard Museum
- Museum Jorn, Silkeborg
- Memphis Mansion
- Randers Museum of Art
- ARoS Aarhus Kunstmuseum
- Aarhus Kunstbygning
- Kvindemuseet
- The Old Town, Aarhus
- Viking Museum (Aarhus)
- Moesgård Museum
- Glasmuseet Ebeltoft
- Danish steam frigate Jylland
- The Engine Collection
- Karlsladen

=== North Denmark ===
- Michael and Anna Ancher House
- Skagens Museum
- Skagen Odde Nature Centre
- Voergaard Castle
- Aalborg Søfarts- og Marinemuseum
- Defence and Garrison Museum
- KUNSTEN Museum of Modern Art Aalborg
- Lindholm Høje
- The Museums in Brønderslev Municipality
- Fur Museum
- Vendsyssel Historical Museum
- The Historical Museum of Northern Jutland

=== Zealand ===
- Danish Tramway Museum
- Køge Museum
- KØS Museum of art in public spaces
- Næstved Museum
- Roskilde Museum
- Rødvig Ship Motor Museum
- Sorø Museum
- Land of Legends (Sagnlandet Lejre)
- GeoCenter Møns Klint
- Thorsvang, Danmarks Samlermuseum
- Viking Ship Museum
- Fuglsang Art Museum
- Middelaldercentret

=== Southern Denmark ===
- Brandts Museum of Photographic Art
- Danish Railway Museum
- Esbjerg Museum
- Esbjerg Printing Museum
- Fisheries and Maritime Museum, Esbjerg
- Funen's Art Museum
- The Funen Village
- Lightship Museum, Esbjerg
- Nymindegab Museum
- Ribe Kunstmuseum
- Tørskind Gravel Pit
- Vejen Art Museum

== Constituent countries ==
=== Greenland ===
- Greenland National Museum
- Nuuk Art Museum
- Qaqortoq Museum
- Sisimiut Museum
- Upernavik Museum

== See also ==
- List of museums
- Tourism in Denmark
- Culture of Denmark
- List of museums in Finland
- List of museums in Norway
- List of museums in Sweden
