= Listed buildings in Køge Municipality =

This is a list of listed buildings in Køge Municipality, Denmark.

== The list ==
=== 4140 Borup ===
Listing name	Image	Location	Coordinates	Description
Borup Ikd School		Hovedgaden 41, 4140 Borup	55°29′58.28″N 11°58′33.69″E	10 bays long half-timbered school building from 1661
Svenstrup		Borupvej 100, 4140 Borup	55°29′31.57″N 11°57′19.07″E	Three-winged manor house from 1781 to 1784 by Johan Christian Kitzlin
Svenstrup		Borupvej 96, 4140 Borup	55°29′23.65″N 11°57′20.42″E	Southern residence for staff
Svenstrup		Borupvej 96, 4140 Borup	55°29′23.65″N 11°57′20.42″E	Northern residence for staff
Svenstrup		Borupvej 96, 4140 Borup	55°29′23.65″N 11°57′20.42″E	Stable
Svenstrup		Borupvej 96, 4140 Borup	55°29′23.65″N 11°57′20.42″E	Stable for sheep

=== 4600 Køge ===
Listing name	Image	Location	Coordinates	Description	
Billesborg		Billesborgvej 59A, 4600 Køge	55°25′35.38″N 12°11′58.7″E	Manor house from 1722 designed by Johan Cornelius Krieger	
Brogade 1: Køge Pharmacy		Brogade 1A, 4600 Køge	55°27′21″N 12°10′56.7″E	Building originally from the 1660s but rebuilt in c. 1800 and 1865	
Brogade 1: Køge Pharmacy		Brogade 1D, 4600 Køge	55°27′21.12″N 12°10′59.08″E	Side wing	
Brogade 16		Brogade 16A, 4600 Køge	55°27′19.36″N 12°10′54.13″E	House from 1636	
Brogade 16		Brogade 16D, 4600 Køge	55°27′19.52″N 12°10′52.61″E	Northern side wing from between 1761 and 1791	
Brogade 18		Brogade 18A, 4600 Køge	1634	House from 1634 but facade on the street rebuilt in brick in 1867	Ref
Brogade 18		Brogade 18A, 4600 Køge		Side wing from c. 1800 but extended with extra floor in 1867	Ref
Brogade 21 and Bag Haverne 52 A		Bag Haverne 52A, 4600 Køge	1634	House and side wing from between 1847 and 1854	Ref
Brogade 21 and Bag Haverne 52 A		Brogade 21A, 4600 Køge	1853	Warehouse from 1853	Ref
Brogade 22		Brogade 22, 4600 Køge		House dating from the middle of the 17th century but rebuilt in 1817 and the half-timbered part of the side wing	Ref
Brogade 23		Brogade 23A, 4600 Køge		Complex from the 1630s and 1640s	Ref
Brogade 26		Brogade 26, 4600 Køge		The house on the street and the wing along the stream	Ref
Gammel Køgegård		Gammel Køgegaard 3, 4600 Køge	1791/1856	Manor house consisting of a main wing from 1791 and two flanking wings from 1856	Ref
Gammel Køgegård		Gammel Køgegaard 5, 4600 Køge	1603	The half-timbered north wing from 1603	Ref
Kirkestræde 3		Kirkestræde 3A, 4600 Køge	1638	Building from 1638	Ref
Kirkestræde 5		Kirkestræde 5, 4600 Køge		House dating from the 17th century but with a front rebuilt in brick between 1847 and 1857	Ref
Kirkestræde 6		Kirkestræde 6, 4600 Køge	c. 1600	House from c. 1600	Ref
Kirkestræde 8		Kirkestræde 8, 4600 Køge		House and side wing from the 17th century but the facade on the street partly rebuilt in the 1840s and in the 1870s	Ref
Kirkestræde 9		Kirkestræde 9, 4600 Køge		Originally two half-timbered houses from the 17th century but with one facade in brick on the street in 1847 and a side wing to the north	Ref
Kirkestræde 10: Asylgården		Kirkestræde 10, 4600 Køge	c. 1620	Building from c. 1620	Ref
Kirkestræde 11		Kirkestræde 9, 4600 Køge		Two half-timbered houses from before 1761 whose north and south sides were revuilt in brick in c. 1850 and 1863	Ref
Kirkestræde 14 and 16		Kirkestræde 16, 4600 Køge		Half-timbered house (No. 14) from before 1761 a house from 1820 (No. 16)	Ref
Kirkestræde 15		Kirkestræde 15, 4600 Køge		Half-timbered house from before 1761 which was partly rebuilt in brick in 1857	Ref
Kirkestræde 17		Kirkestræde 17, 4600 Køge		Half-timbered house from before 1791 which was partly rebuilt in brick and extended with an extra floor in 1861	Ref
Kirkestræde 20		Kirkestræde 20, 4600 Køge	1628	House from 1527	Ref
Kirkestræde 21		Kirkestræde 21, 4600 Køge	1810	Corner building from 1810 except for the western half of the Lille Kirkestræde wing which is from 1847	Ref
Kirkestræde 23		Kirkestræde 23, 4600 Køge		Wall section from the Middle Ages	Ref
Kirkestræde 25		Kirkestræde 25–27, 4600 Køge		House from the 17th century but later altered	Ref
Køge Bridge		Brogade 0, 4600 Køge	1633	Bridge from 1633 designed by Hans van Steenwinckel the Younger and widened in 1802, 1923, 1935 and 1994	Ref
Køge Jailhouse		Bygårdsstræde 1, 4600 Køge	1855	Former jailhouse from 1855 and wall on Nørregade from 1857	Ref4
Køge Museum			Nørregade 4, 4600 Køge	Originally two half-timbered houses, both from the 1610s	Ref
Køge Museum		Nørregade 4, 4600 Køge		Side wing of which the western part is from the 1510s and the eastern part is from the second half of the 17th century	Ref
Køge Town Hall		Torvet 1, 4600 Køge		Building from 1552 and later but strongly altered in 1803	Ref4
Laugshusgade 8		Laugshusgade 8, 4600 Køge	1882	House from 1882	Ref4
Norske Løve		Niels Juelsgade 1	1810s	Two-storey hotel building with a hipped, red tile roof from the 1810s	Ref4
Nørregade 5		Nørregade 5, 4600 Køge	c. 1620	Townhouse from c. 1620	Ref4
Nørregade 22		Nørregade 22, 4600 Køge		Townhouse from the late 17th century but with the facade rebuilt in 1877	Ref4
Nørregade 31		Nørregade 31, 4600 Køge	c. 1620	Townhouse built between 1612 and 1615	Ref4
Nørregade 41		Nørregade 41A, 4600 Køge	1847	Townhouse from 1846 to 1847	Ref
Nørregade 41		Nørregade 41A, 4600 Køge	1847	Side wing	Ref
Privatmejeriet Vasebæk		Ågade 1, 4600 Køge	1930	Former dairy from 1930	Ref4
Smedegården		Kirkestræde 13A, 4600 Køge	1882	Complex consisting of a two-storey northern from the middle of the 16th century /door from 1696 flanked by two decorated stone plates from c. 15020 originating from Copenhagen Castle), a one-storey southern part probably dates from the 17th century and a northern side wing dates from c. 1620	Ref4
Torvet 5		Torvet 5, 4600 Køge	c. 1550	House dating from c. 1550 but altered in the 19th century	Ref4
Torvet 13		Torvet 13, 4600 Køge	55°27′22.06″N 12°10′54.51″E	Hourse from 1580 to 1600 that was partly rebuilt and expanded across Åstræde in c. 1635-45	Ref
Torvet 13		Torvet 13, 4600 Køge	55°27′22.06″N 12°10′54.51″E	Side wing probably from 1580 to 1600	Ref
Torvet 19		Torvet 10, 4600 Køge	55°27′21.02″N 12°10′51.41″E	Warehouse from 1844	Ref
Torvet 19		Torvet 19, 4600 Køge	55°27′21.19″N 12°10′51.04″E	Pavilion	Ref
Torvet 21: Manufakturgården		Torvet 21, 4600 Køge	1882	Building dating from the Middle Ages and 1634 but adapted in 1826	Ref4
Torvet 28		Torvet 28, 4600 Køge	55°27′24.78″N 12°10′49.68″E	House dating from c. 1550 but altered in the 19th century	Ref4
Tøxen's School		Nørregade 43, 4600 Køge	1859	School building from 1859	Ref
Ulfeldt House		Nørregade 24A, 4600 Køge		House of which the northern part of the facade dates from 1650 and the southern part dates from 1851–52	Ref
Vestergade 5		Vestergade 5, 4600 Køge	1850	House from 1850	Ref
Vestergade 7: Blikkenslagergården		Vestergade 6A, 4600 Køge	c. 1578	House from c. 1689	Ref
Vestergade 7: Blikkenslagergården		Vestergade 6A, 4600 Køge		Side wing	Ref
Garvergården		Vestergade 7A, 4600 Køge	c. 1600	Two-storey house with exposed timber framing and side wing dating from c. 1600	Ref
Garvergården		Vestergade 7, 4600 Køge	c. 1600	A three-bay, detached building which was originally part of the side wing	Ref
Vestergade 16		Vestergade 16G, 4600 Køge	1644	Two-storey, half-timbered building from 1644	Ref
Køge Iron Foundry		Vestergade 29A, 4600 Køge	1875	Building on the street from 1875	Ref
Køge Iron Foundry		Vestergade 29B, 4600 Køge		Side wing of which the narrow part dates from 1837 and the wide part dates from 1842	Ref
Køge Iron Foundry		Vestergade 29C, 4600 Køge	1865	Rear wing(foundry wing from 1865	Ref
Vestergade 31		Vestergade 31, 4600 Køge	1746	House from 1857 and expanded with an extra floor towards the street in 1886	Ref
Vestergade 33		Vestergade 33, 4600 Køge	1801	House built in 1801 and later shortened	Ref

=== 4681 Herfølge ===
Listing name	Image	Location	Coordinates	Description
Hegnetslund		Vordingborgvej 82, 4681 Herfølge	55°25′16.04″N 12°8′35.1″E	House from 1825 designed by Hans Jørgen Koch
Herfølge Station		Stationsvej 16, 4681 Herfølge	55°25′3.67″N 12°8′14.02″E	Station building from 1908 by Heinrich Wenck
Herfølge Station		Stationsvej 16, 4681 Herfølge	55°25′3.67″N 12°8′14.02″E	Warehouse from 1908 by Heinrich Wenck
Herfølge Station		Stationsvej 16, 4681 Herfølge	55°25′3.67″N 12°8′14.02″E	Toilet building from 1908 by Heinrich Wenck
Scheels Hospital		Kirkevej 3A, 4681 Herfølge	55°25′1.61″N 12°8′51.92″E	Hospital building from the 1720s
Scheels Hospital		Kirkevej 3A, 4681 Herfølge	55°25′1.61″N 12°8′51.92″E	Garden pavilion
