= Bispetorv =

Bispetorv (lit. Bishop's Square) may refer to:

- Bispetorv, Copenhagen, a square in Copenhagen, Denmark
- Bispetorv, Aarhus, a square in Aarhus, Denmark
