= Tøxen's School =

School building in Køge, Denmark

- Tøxens Skole
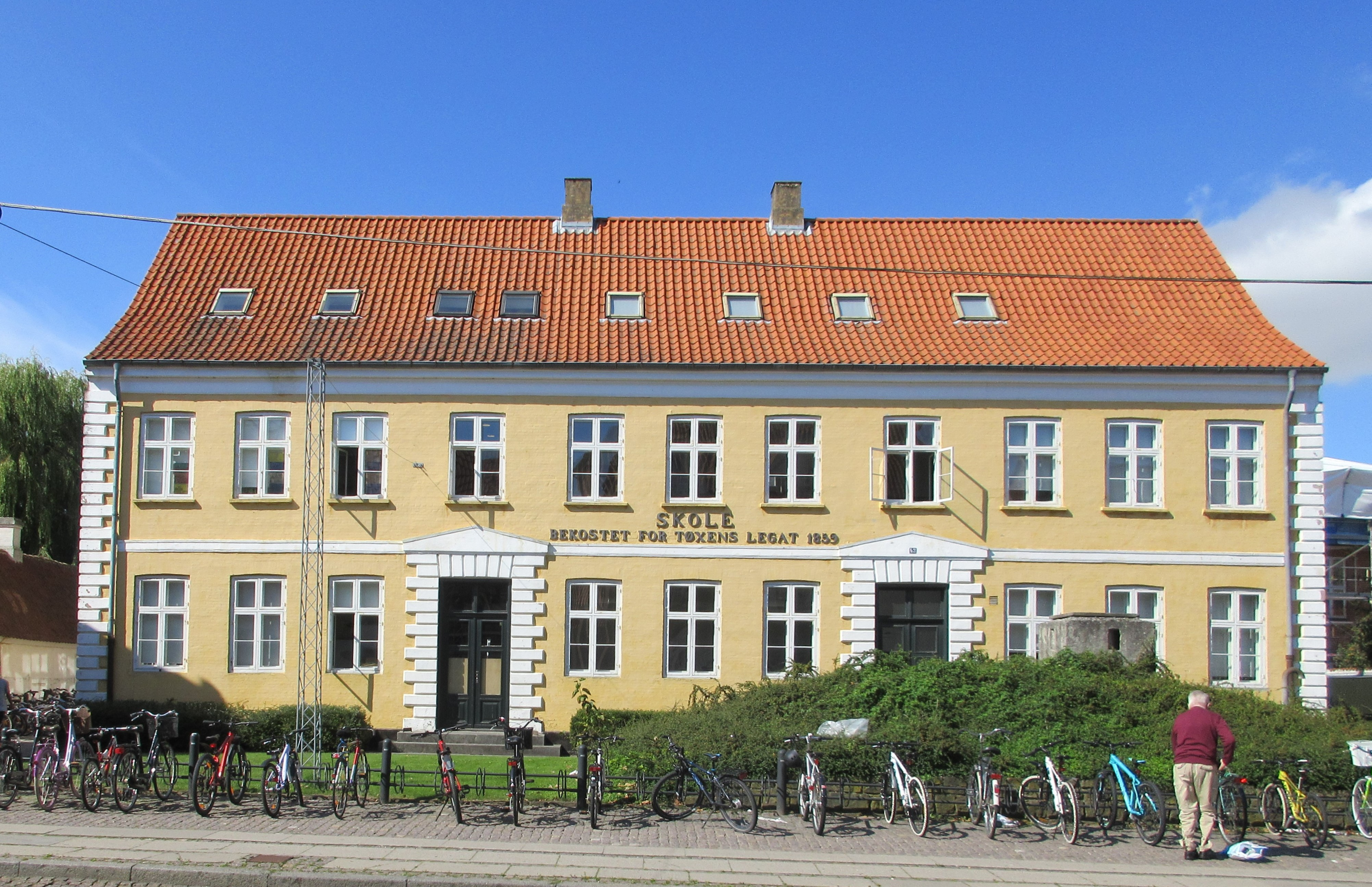
- Tøxen's School viewed from across the street
- Interactive map of the Tøxen's School area

General information
- Location: Køge, Denmark
- Coordinates: 55°27′36.44″N 12°11′2.17″E
- Completed: 1859

Tøxen's School (Danish: Tøxens Skole) is a former school in Køge, Denmark. Its building from 1859 in Nørregade is listed.

== History ==
When the Latin school in Køge closed in 1776, it was a great loss of prestige for the town, and aspiring students now had to go to Roskilde, Næstved or Copenhagen to study. A new school, Borgerskolen, opened in 1808. It was based in the old Provost's house, Provstegården, at the corner of Nørregade and Katekismusgade.

In 1826, Thomas Tøxen, a wealthy merchant with no children, made a donation of 15,000 Danish rigsdaler for the establishment of a "higher school" in Køge. He had inherited the Oluf I. Jensen House in Brogade (No. 5–7) in 1783 and had previously made large donations to the church and indigent citizens. Only the income on his endowment could be used. He outlived his wife and lived the last years of his life at Køge Torv 22 up to his death. In 1856, when the interest of 8,000 rigsdaler had accumulated, it was finally decided to build the school. A site between the town's North Gate and Norske Løve was chosen, and the school was inaugurated on 2 February 1859. In the mid-1980s, it was decided to merge the school with Brochmand's School, and the name of the school was changed to Sct. Nikolaj Skole.
