= KØS Museum of art in public spaces =

Art museum in Køge, Denmark

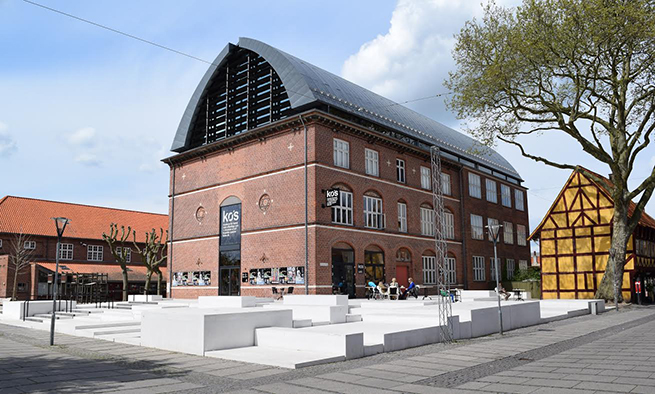
- The building viewed from Nørregade
- Location: Nørregade 29, Køge, Denmark
- Coordinates: 55.458828°N 12.183414°E
- Director: Ulrikke Neergaard
- Website: Official website

KØS Museum of art in public spaces is situated in Nørregade in Køge, Denmark. It is the only museum in Denmark focusing of art in the public realm. It boasts a collection of models and sketches for public artworks and plays host to special exhibitions about the subject. Its permanent exhibition includes the original plaster model for the Little Mermaid in Copenhagen and the cartoons for the Queen’s tapestries in the Danish parliament by Bjørn Nørgaard.

The museum opened in 1977 under the name Køge Skitsesamling (Køge Sketch Collection). Its building was adapted in 2001 by local architectural firm Køge Arkitekterne. In 2009, the museum adopted its current name.

== See also ==
- Køge Museum
