= Køge Å =

Coordinates: 55°27′N 12°12′E

Køge River
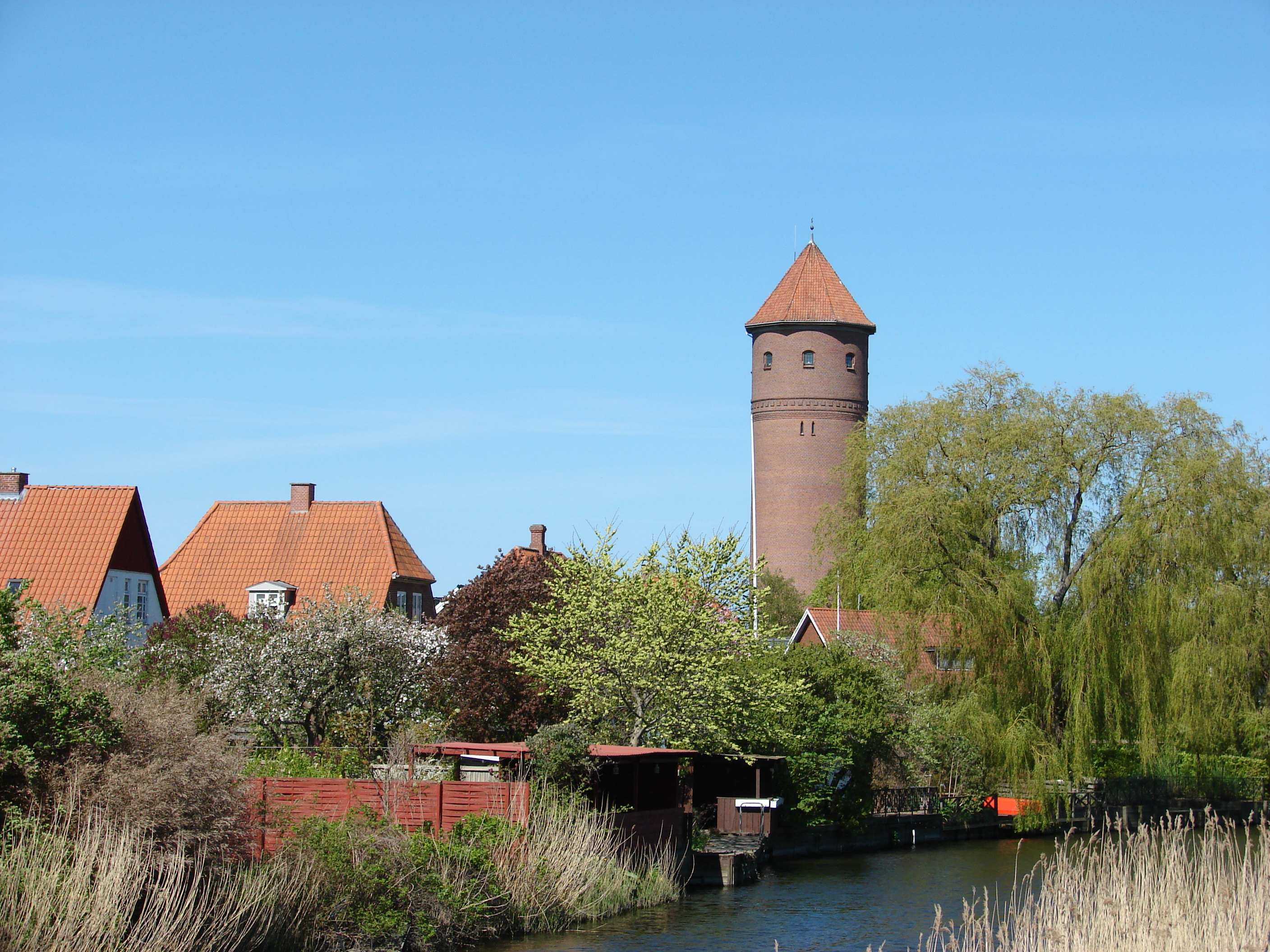
- Køge Å and watertower
- Native name: Køge Å (Danish)

Location
- Country: Denmark
- Region: Zealand
- District: Region Zealand
- Municipality: Køge Municipality

Physical characteristics
- Mouth: Køge
  - location: Bay of Køge
  - elevation: 0 m (0 ft)
- Length: 20.6 km (12.8 mi)

Køge Å is a 20.6 km long stream or small river which drains into the Bay of Køge in central Køge, on the east coast of Zealand, some 40 km south of Copenhagen, Denmark. The stream originates in the area south of the protected Regnemarks Mose boglands and is 10 metres wide at its mouth. A 22 km gravel road for cyclists and pedestrians follows the stream from the town of Køge to Humleore on onwards to Borup station.

Extraction of groundwater for Copenhagen's water supply has drained its basin since the 1960s and the stream is therefore fed with water from Kimmerslev Lake in dry periods and a pumping station at Skovhuse Vænge also feeds it with ground water.

== Ecology ==
Køge Å is home to the endangered Spined loach (Cobitis taenia).

== Landmarks ==
A 22-km long gravel road for pedestrians and cyclists follows the stream. The listed Køge Bridge dates from 1637. It was designed by Hans van Steenwinckel the Younger but has been widened several times.
