= Garvergården =

Danish building

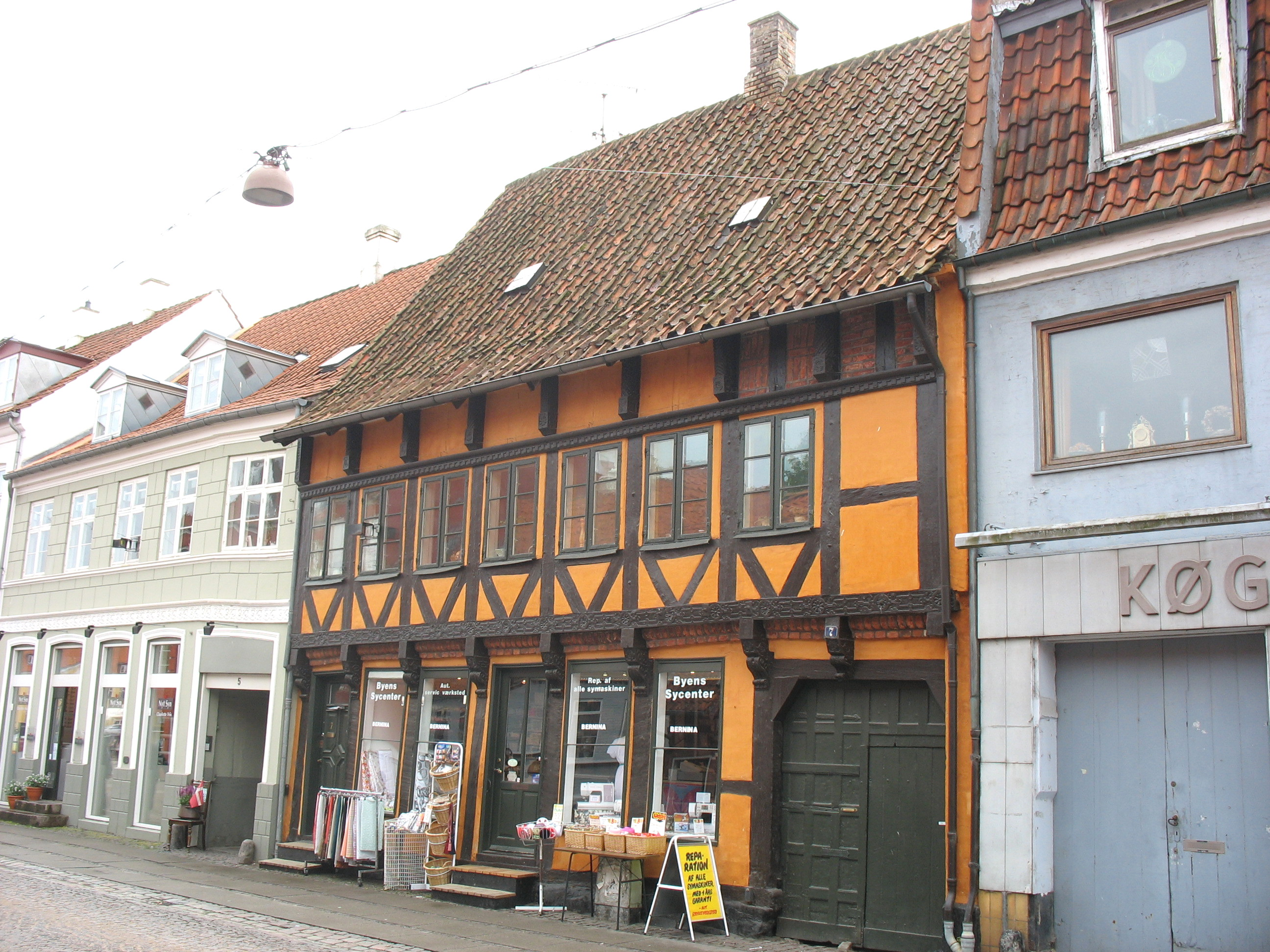
- Interactive map of the Garvergården area

General information
- Location: Køge, Denmark
- Coordinates: 55°27′24.16″N 12°10′47.36″E
- Completed: 1595-1699

Garvergården (lit. "The Tanner's House") is a half-timbered building complex from circa 1600 situated in Vestergade in Køge, Denmark. Owned by shoemakers and tanners for almost 200 years, from 1732, until the early 1920s, it bears testament to a time when Køge was a centre for shoemaking and tanning. The building fronting the street and a side wing on its rear are listed.

== History ==
Built between 1595 and 1600, Garvergården is the oldest building in Vestergade. It was one of few houses in the street that survived the great fire of 1633 which destroyed large parts of western and southern Køge. The first known owner of the property was skipper Albret Gudmandsen. He died in 1634 and shortly thereafter his widow married another skipper, Mads Nielsen, who died in 1646. In 1650, the wealthy widow, aged 53, married the local pastor of St Nicolas' Church, Christian Madsen Tausen. The couple moved to Norway when he was appointed to Bishop of Stavanger in 1661.

The first shoemaker to own the property acquired it in 1732. Køge was by then a centre for shoemaking and tanning. The town's shoemakers had been granted a royal license to sell their products on the markets in many towns on Zealand. Those shoemakers who owned property bordering Køge Å were usually also active in tanning and the town became home to several specialized tanneries. At the census of 1800, Køge was home to a total of 25 shoemakers. With their families, employees and servants it added up to 193 people or one eighth of Køge's 1,526 residents.

A tanner first took over the building in 1808. The last tanner to own it was Julius Christensen, who purchased it in 1882 and continued to operate it as a tannery until the early 1920s. The ground floor was then converted into a shop. Bernina Syeksperten has occupied the premises since 1983.
