= Danish Railway Museum =

Coordinates: 55°24′10″N 10°23′10″E

Danmarks Jernbanemuseum
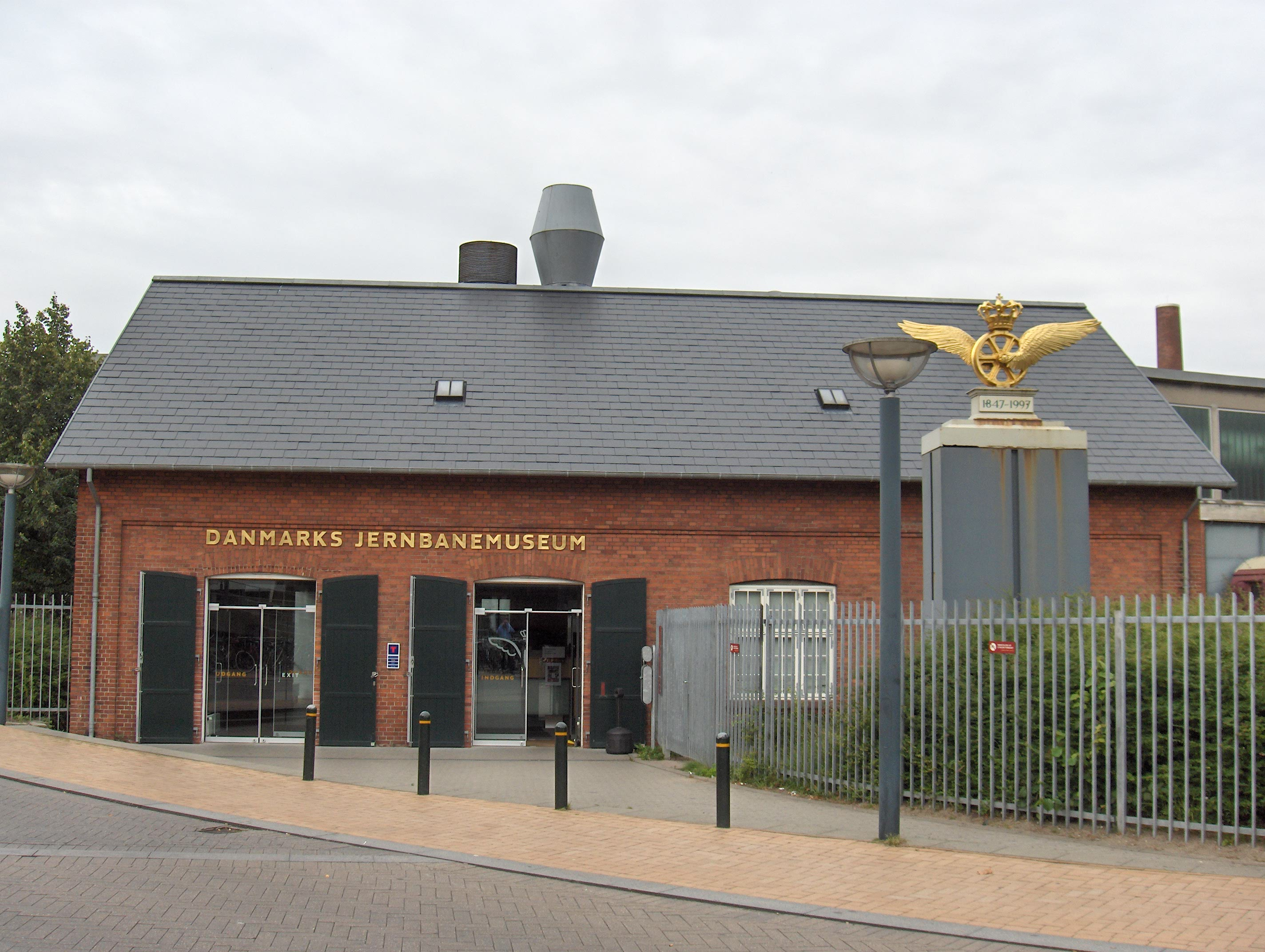
- Entrance of the museum.
- Established: 1975
- Location: Dannebrogsgade 24; Odense, Denmark
- Type: Railway museum
- Public transit access: Odense station
- Website: www.jernbanemuseum.dk

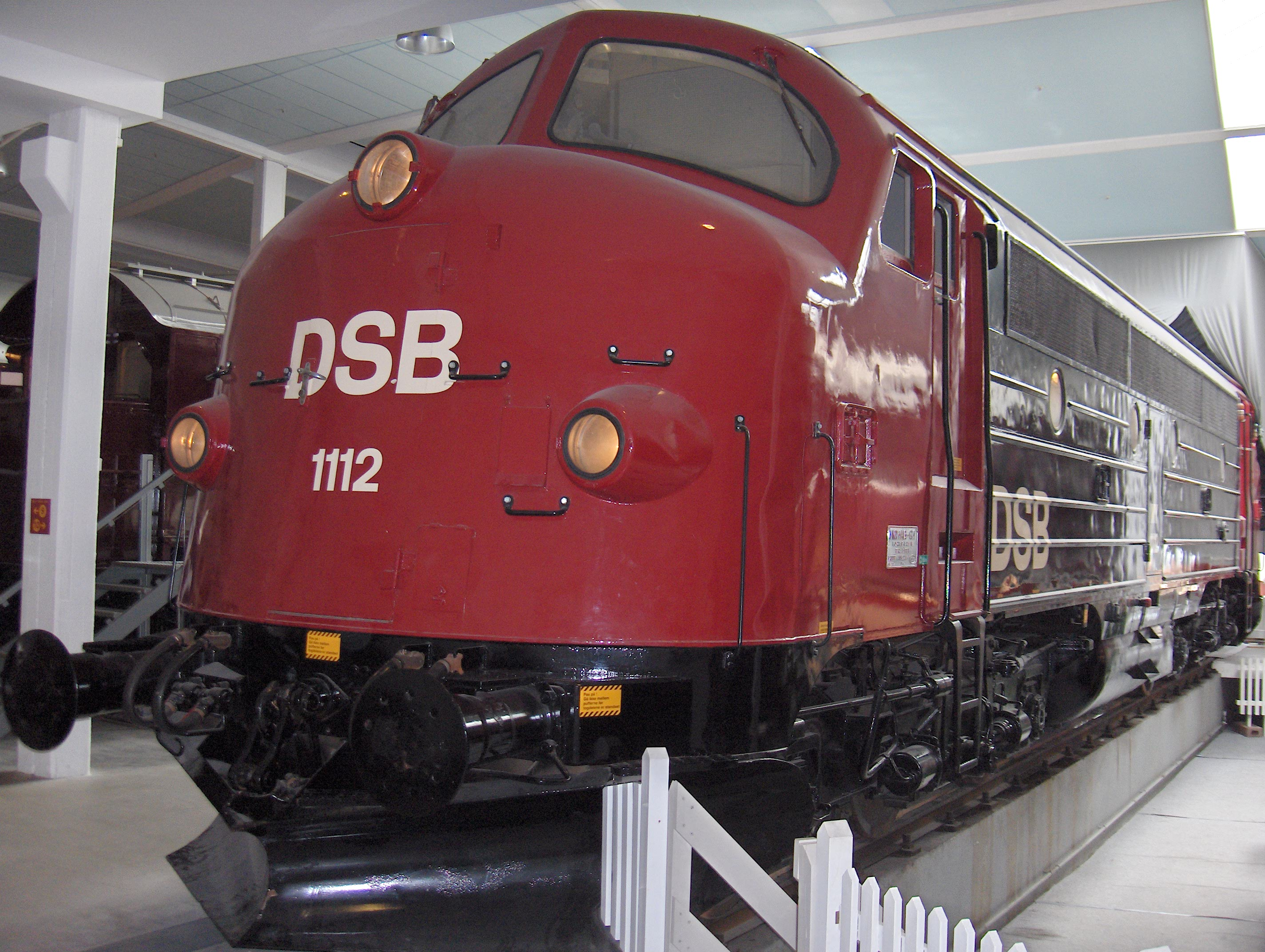
Preserved NOHAB locomotive

The Danish Railway Museum (Danish: Danmarks Jernbanemuseum) is the national railway museum of Denmark, located in the city of Odense. Established in 1975, it is situated in a former engine shed adjacent to the city's main railway station. It is the largest railway museum in Scandinavia.

Covering 10,000 square metres, it contains some 50 locomotives and railway carriages on 20 railtracks from all periods of Danish rail history, plus some original buildings of Danish railways. Items from DSB's history include an E class steam locomotive used to haul the funeral train of King Frederik IX of Denmark, a NOHAB diesel locomotive (sectioned on one side, to reveal the engine), an original 1930s Copenhagen-area S-train carriage and a 1950s Lyntog ('lightning train') express diesel multiple unit.

In school holidays, the museum also runs a live steam-hauled train on a short section of track. These usually consist of a Class Hs loco and two carriages.

== See also ==
- DSB (railway company)
- List of museums in Denmark
