= Køge Pharmacy =

Historic building in Køge, Denmark

- Køge Apotek
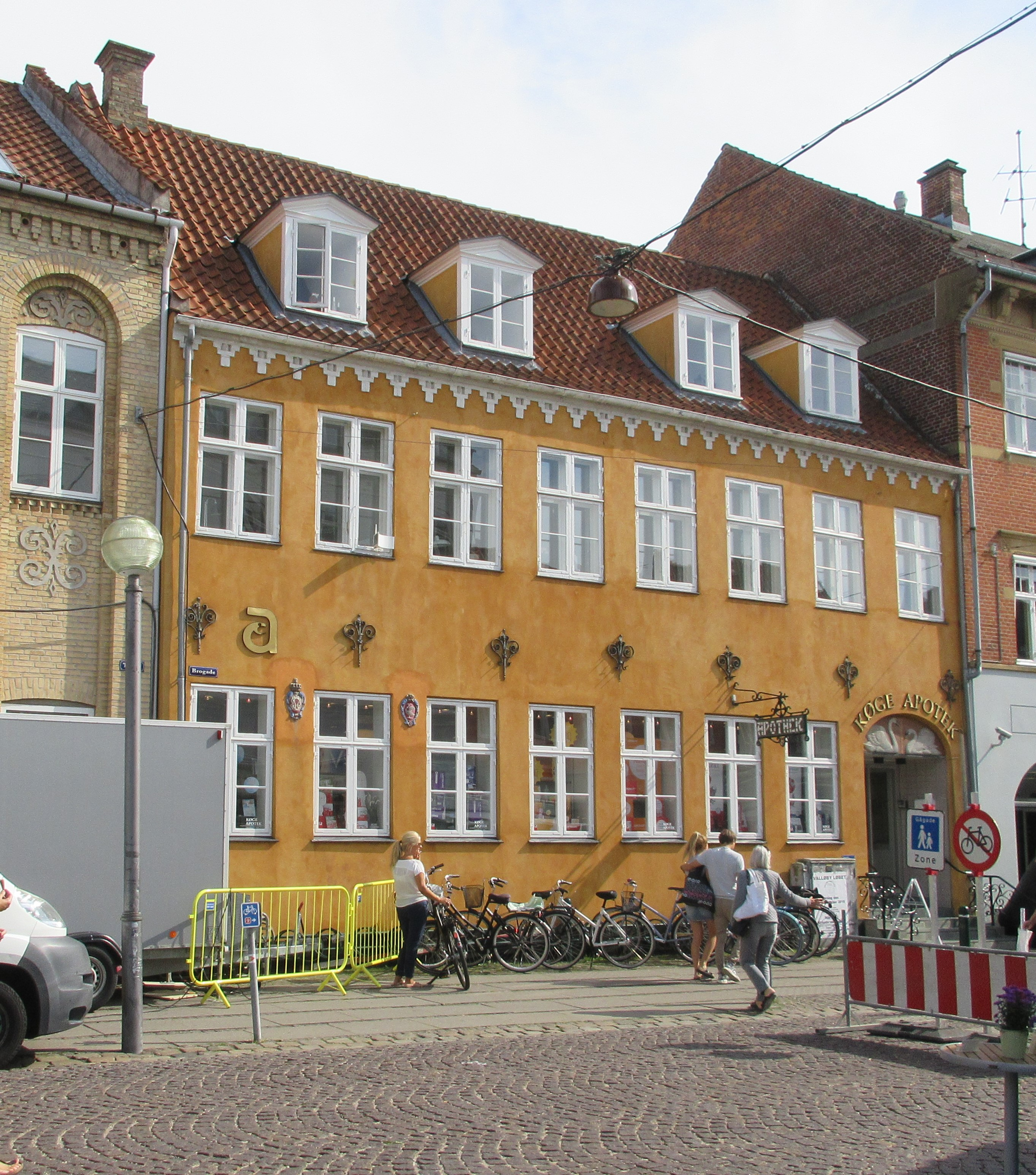
- The pharmacy in 2016
- Interactive map of the Køge Pharmacy area

General information
- Location: Køge, Denmark
- Coordinates: 55°27′21″N 12°10′56.7″E
- Construction started: 1660s
- Completed: 1686

Køge Pharmacy (Danish: Køge Apotek) was founded in 1646 and is located just off the central market square in Køge, Denmark. The buildings are originally from the 1660s but the main building was altered in circa 1800 and again in 1865. A long, half-timbered building extends from the rear side of the pharmacy. Both buildings were listed on the Danish registry of protected buildings and places in 1919.

== History ==
Køge Pharmacy was founded on 30 August 1646 by Jørgen Berentsen and was then located at Brogade 12. It relocated to its current site in 1665.

== Architecture ==
The pharmacy is originally from 1660s but was altered in c. 1800 and again in 1865. The pharmacy building is an eight bays wide, two-storey brick building. The street side is dressed in a yellow colour and features white cornice dentils under the roof and six Fleur-de-lis-shaped wall anchors between the two storeys. The roof is clad in red tiles and features four dormer windows. The main entrance to the pharmacy is placed in a former gateway which was used for carriages to enter the courtyard. The tympanum features a tile painting of two swans that face each other.

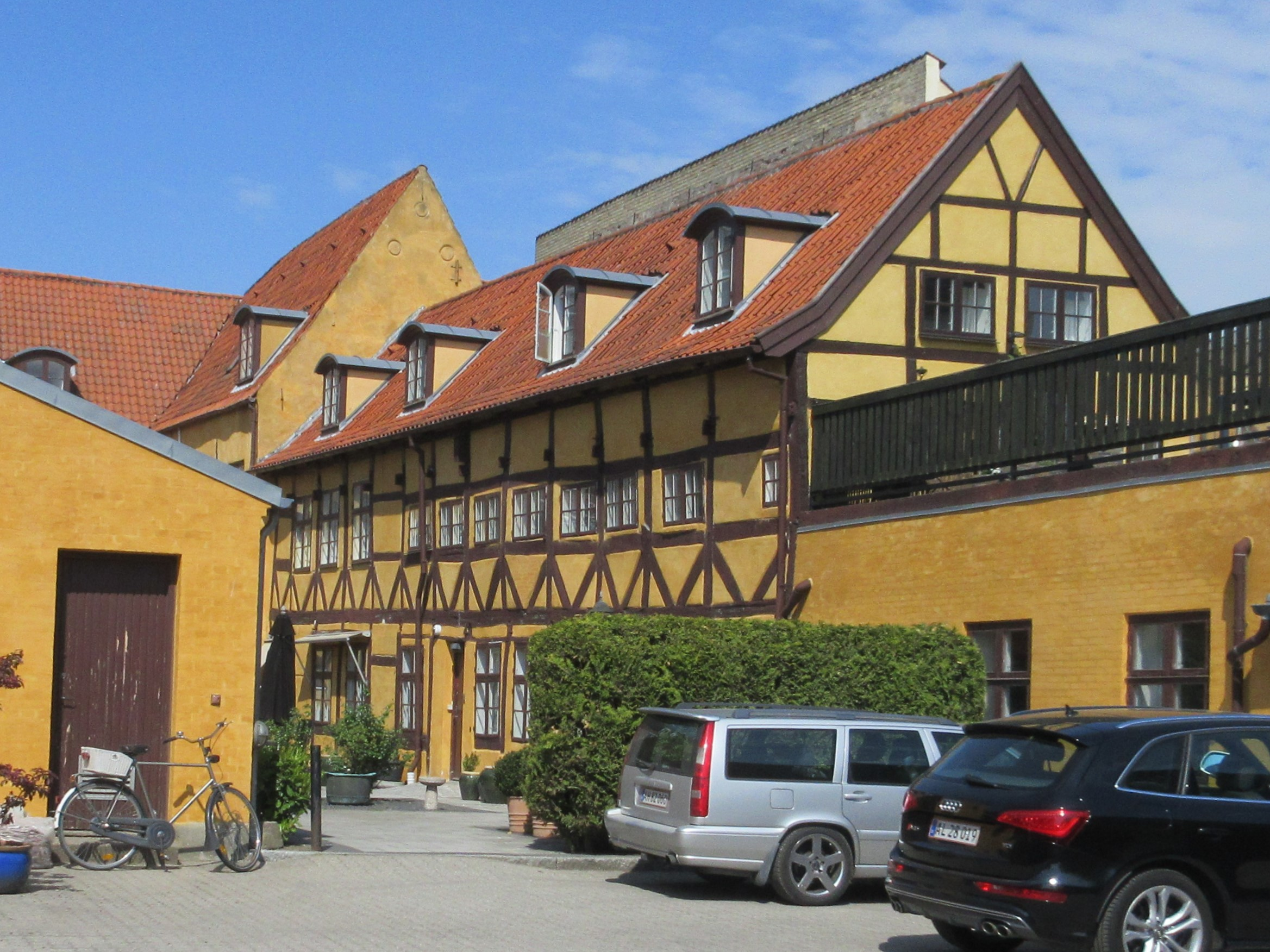
The 13-bay, hald-timbered building

A four-bay side wing extends from the northern end of the rear side of the building. The two southernmost bays are recessed on the upper floor. The recessed wall features three wall anchors shaped as the letters I B C, representing the initials of Jørgen Berendsen for whom the building was adapted in 1865.

The gable of the side wing is attached to a somewhat lower 13 bays long two-storey building with exposed timber framing.

Both buildings were listed on the Danish registry of protected buildings and places in 1919 and the scope of the heritage listing was expanded in 1983.
