= Memphis Mansion =

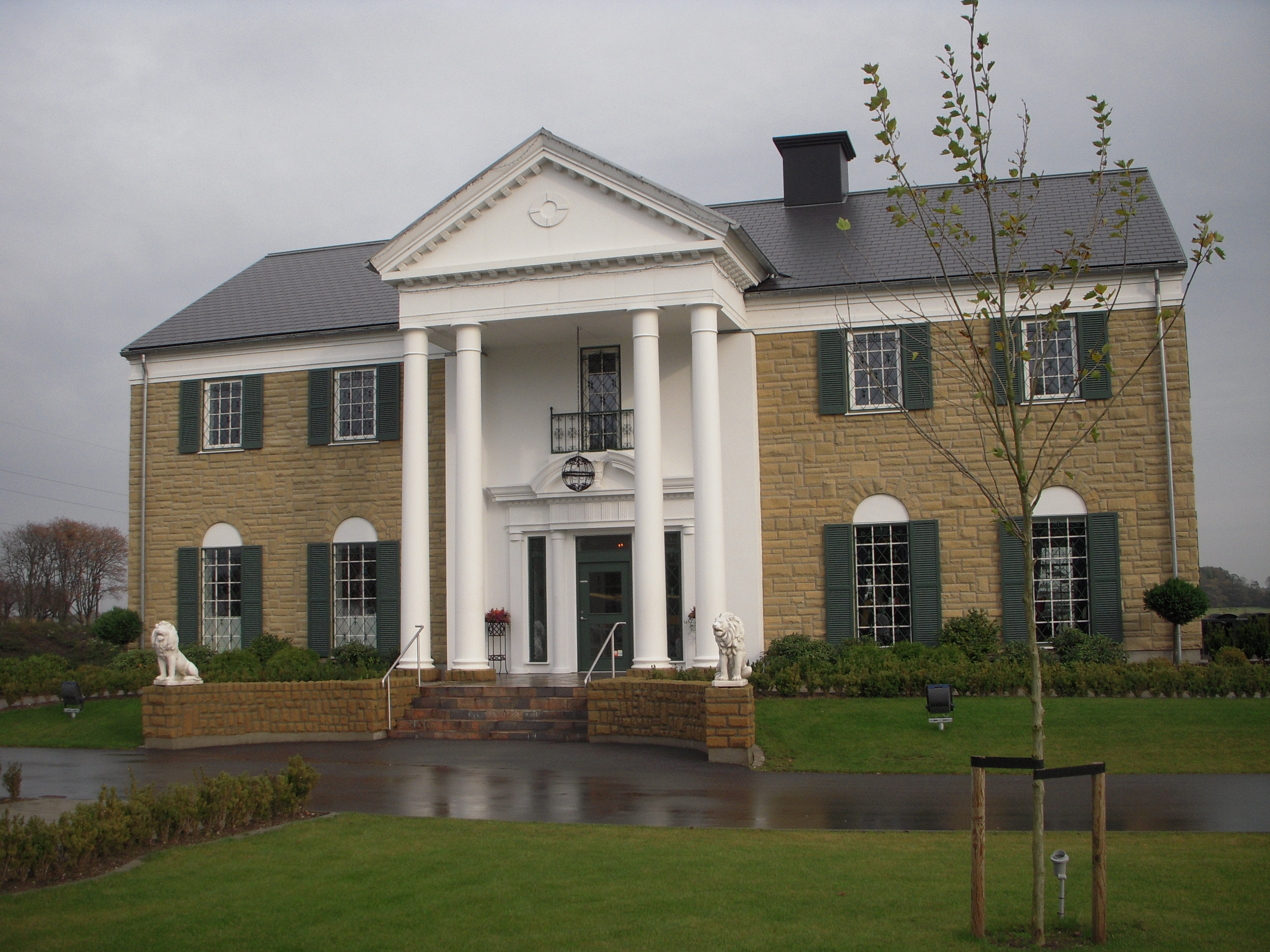

- Location within Denmark
- Established: 14 April 2011
- Location: Graceland Randers Vej 3, Randers
- Coordinates: 56°25′59.06″N 10°3′17.92″E
- Type: biographical museum
- Collections: about Elvis Presley
- Website: memphismansion.dk

Memphis Mansion, until 2015 Graceland Randers, is a museum and restaurant in Randers, Denmark. It is dedicated to the rock and roll singer and actor Elvis Presley (1935–1977).

== History and background ==
The museum was opened on 14 April 2011 by Henrik Knudsen. The official opening took place the day after by the mayor of Randers Henning Jensen Nyhuus, the American ambassador James P. Cain and singer Suzi Quatro. It is twice as big as Graceland in Memphis, of which the outside is nearly a direct copy.

The museum has a collection of about 6,000 pieces, with an estimated value of 1.5 million euros. Next to that, a restaurant in American style and a fan shop have been established.

Memphis Mansion is in the top 50 of Danish attractions. In 2015 it attracted 130,000 visitors.

== Name change ==
Knudsen registered the name Graceland Randers in 2006, about five years before the opening in 2011. In 2015 a lawsuit was filed against him for unlawful use of the name of Graceland. The Maritime and Commercial Court (Sø- og Handelsretten) justified the claim of the heirs in September 2016 and imposed an indemnification of 500,000 Danish krones (approximately 75,000 dollars). Prior to the judgement, the name was changed to Memphis Mansion. The claim that counterfeit articles of Elvis had been sold was declared unfounded.

== Impression ==
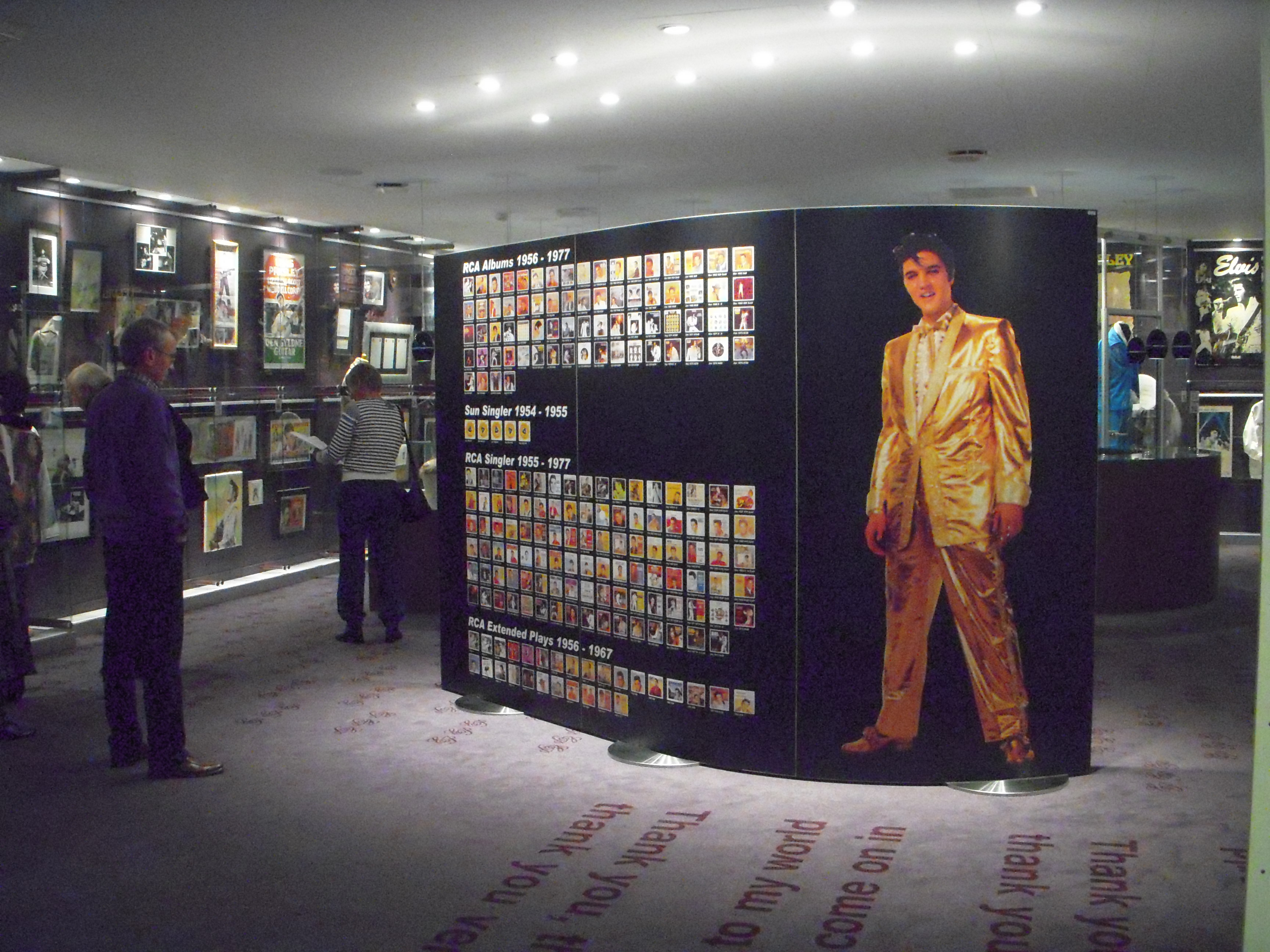
inside the museum

== See also ==
- List of museums in Denmark
- List of music museums
