= Bispetorv, Aarhus =

Public square in Denmark

Bispetorv
- Bishop's Square
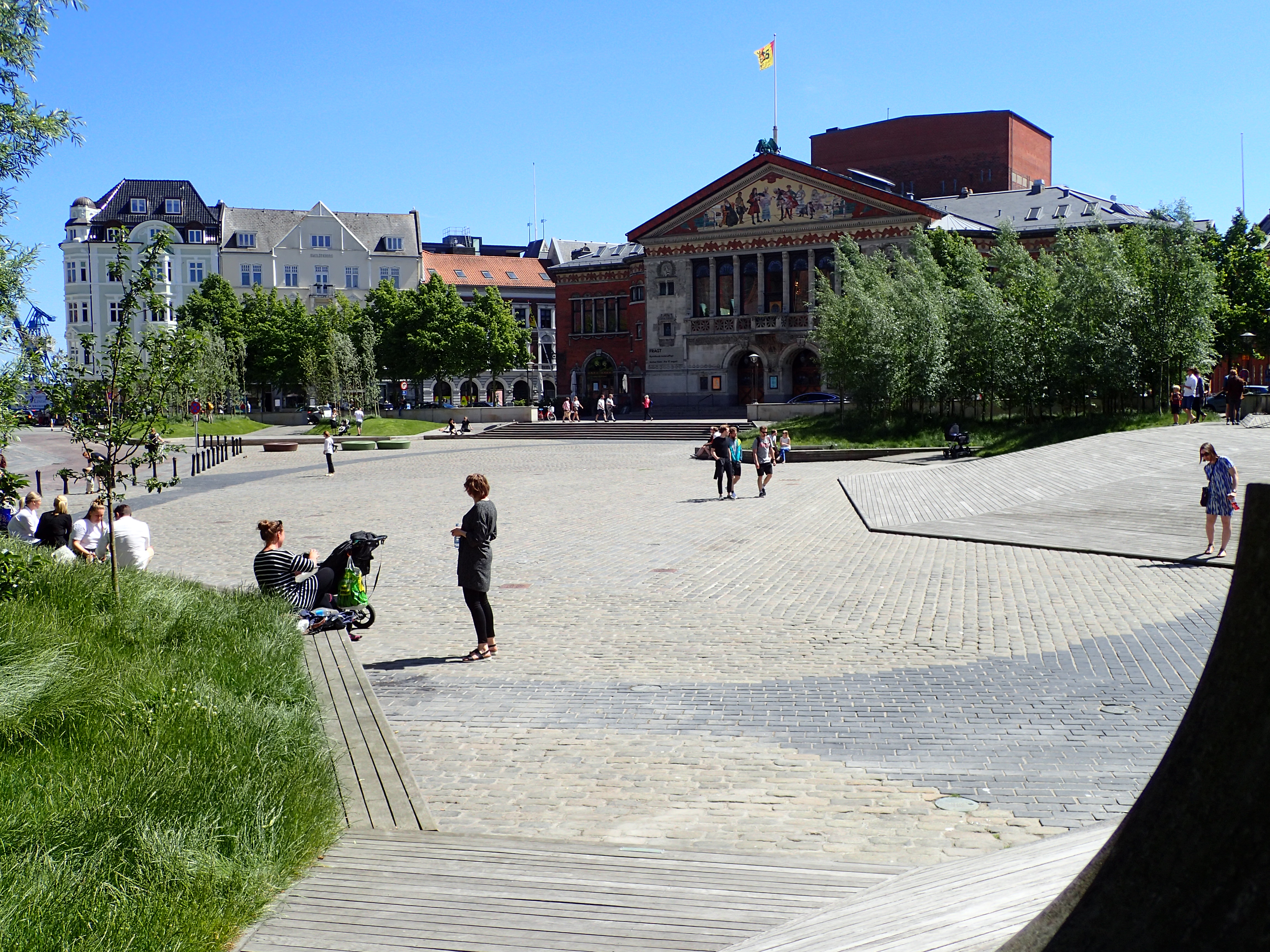
- Bispetorv in 2017
- Interactive map of Bispetorv
- Former name(s): Torvet, Gammeltorv
- Area: 5,000 m^{2} (54,000 sq ft)
- Location: Indre By, Aarhus, Denmark
- Postal code: 8000
- Coordinates: 56°09′23.1″N 10°12′36.9″E

Bispetorv (lit. 'Bishop's Square') is a public square located in the Indre By neighborhood of Aarhus, Denmark. The square covers approximately 5,000 m^{2} (54,000 sq ft) and features an equestrian statue of king Christian X. Bispetorv is surrounded my a number of notable historic buildings, including Aarhus Cathedral, Aarhus Theatre, and the Viking Museum. It was last renovated in 2016, when it was converted from a parking lot to a public space which is today a venue for many public events and gatherings in the city.

Bispetorv faces Aarhus Cathedral to the north, Aarhus Theatre to the east and is located in or close to the historic Latin Quarter neighborhood. A low sandstone wall bounds the square to the east, south and west and there are two small fountains with drinking water. The streets of Mejlgade, Skolegade and the squares of Store Torv and Skt. Clemens Torv emanate from Bispetorv.

== History ==
Originally, in the early Viking settlement, the area of present-day Bispetorv was a pagan burial site, and like today, right in the center of town. In the 900s, Aarhus became the seat of the Diocese of Aarhus and in the late 11th century the bishop Peder Vognsen initiated construction of Aarhus Cathedral on and slightly north of the burial site. The cathedral would come to dominate the area henceforth. The cathedral and its diocese grew larger through the following centuries and a number of buildings were constructed south of it for clergy and administration. The primary buildings in the area was a large stone building used by the cathedral chapter and a number of homes for clergy.

After the reformation in Denmark the chapter house was turned into the home of the bishop with a large garden and wall facing the street of Kannikegade, immediately south of Bispetorv. Kanikkegade (Canon Street) is named for the canon houses that lined it at the time. In 1881, Aarhus Municipality bought the bishop's house and demolished it in order to create a public space and give the cathedral "room to breathe". The space between Store Torv and the new square was still occupied by a building which wasn't removed until 1921 when Bispetorv was given its current size and shape.

The square has been a center for Aarhus Festival Week for many years. In 2009, a contest for future use of the square was published. The contest was won by the landscaping company Schønherr which in the following years transformed the square from a parking lot to a public space with trees and greenery.

Bispetorv has been excavated by archaeologists from Moesgård Museum several times and during a dig in the 1960s many notable artifacts from the Viking Age was uncovered. This incited the construction of the Viking Museum, a small in situ museum, displaying and contextualizing the finds. Later digs, lately in 2009–2011, has unearthed new important finds from the Viking Age and Medieval times of Aarhus and the excavations aims to expand the Viking Museum as a subterranean museum beneath Bispetorv.
