= Rødvig =

- Town
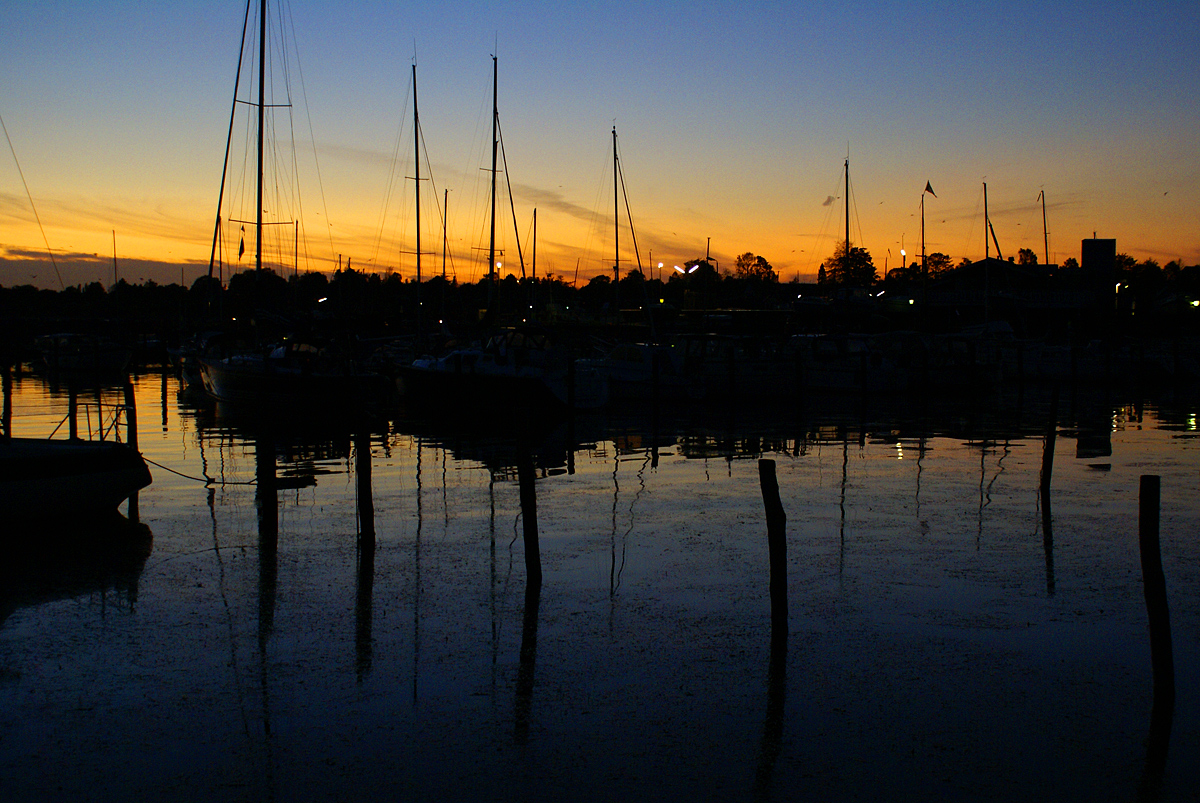
- Evening at Rødvig Harbour

- Location in Denmark Rødvig (Denmark Region Zealand)
- Coordinates: 55°15′17″N 12°22′42″E
- Country: Denmark
- Region: Region Zealand
- Municipality: Stevns Municipality

Area
  - Urban: 1.72 km^{2} (0.66 sq mi)

Population (2026)
  - Urban: 1,828
  - Urban density: 1,060/km^{2} (2,750/sq mi)
- Time zone: UTC+1 (CET)
  - Summer (DST): UTC+2 (CEST)
- Postal code: 4673 Rødvig Stevns

Rødvig is a town and fishing harbour, with a population of 1,828 (1 January 2026), in Stevns Municipality, Region Zealand in Denmark.

The town is situated on the southeast coast of Zealand just south of Stevns Klint.

== The harbour ==
Rødvig Harbour is a combined marina and fishing harbour. It is the second largest active fishing harbour on Zealand.

Rødvig Flint oven stands at the harbour, as a landmark for Rødvig. It is a 3.5-meter-tall (11 ft) square building, with a 5-meter-high (16 ft) chimney brick on top. The current oven is a replica of a flint oven build in 1870 for production of flint flour used for faience.

== Attractions ==
Rødvig Ship Motor Museum, located at Havnevej 7, near the harbour, has a collection of approximately 400 different ship engines.

Rødvig Beach is a sandy beach stretching more than 1 kilometer west of the harbour.

== Transportation ==
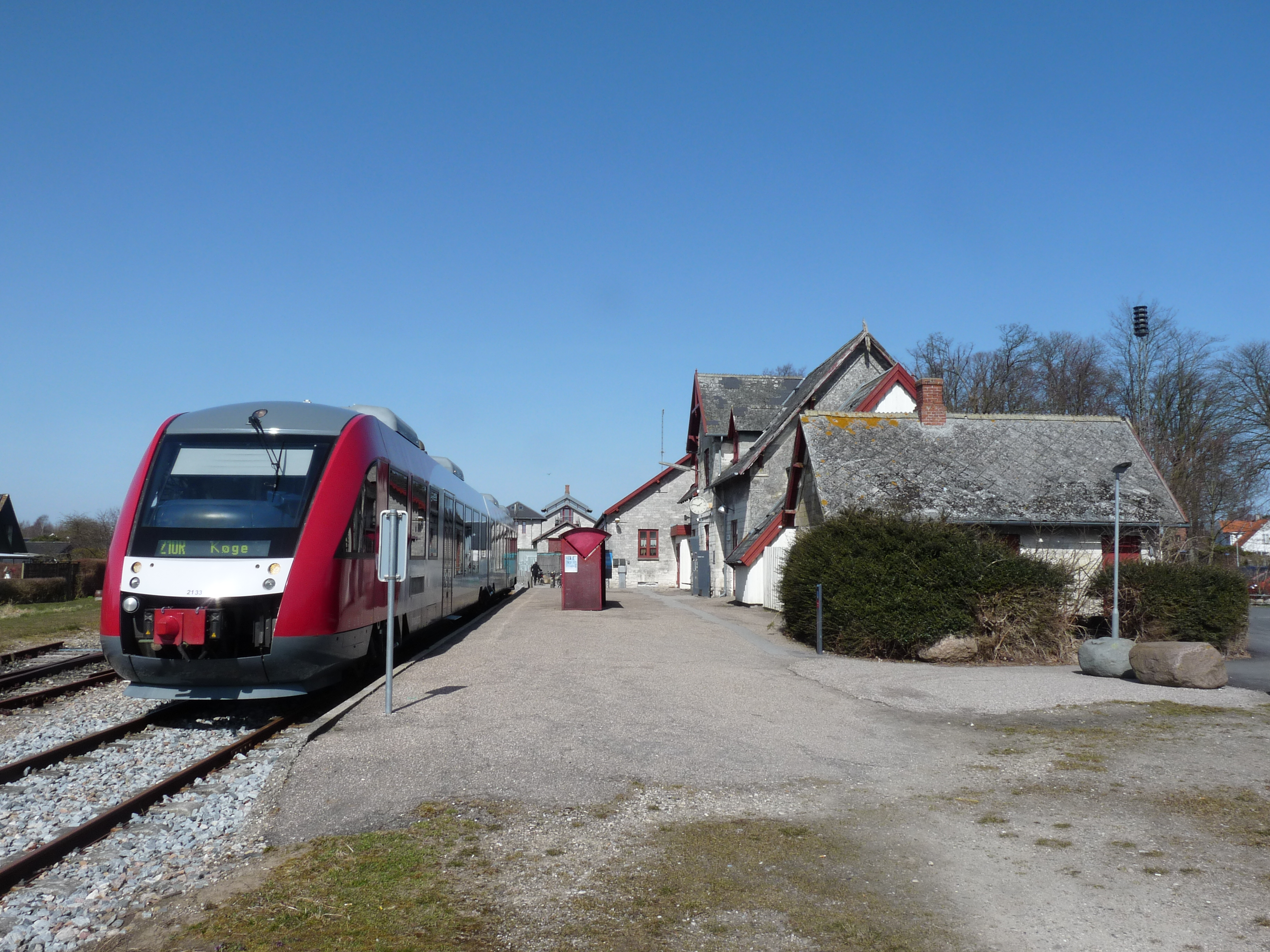
Rødvig railway station

Rødvig is served by Rødvig railway station. The station is the southern terminus of the Hårlev-Rødvig branch of the Østbanen railway line which connects Rødvig with Køge and the rest of the Danish rail network.
