= Aalborg Søfarts- og Marinemuseum =

Marine museum in Aalborg, Denmark

Coordinates: 57°3′32″N 9°53′38″E

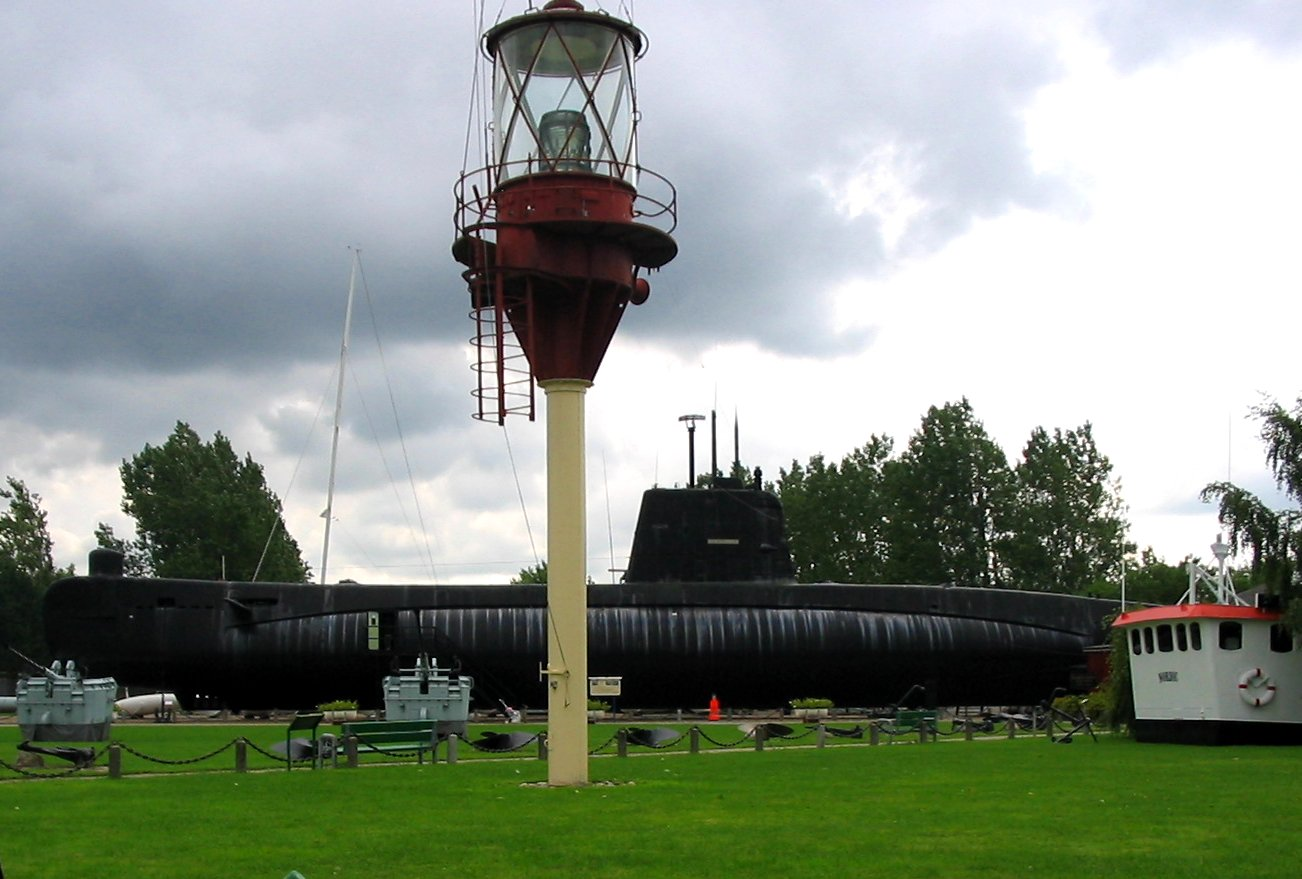

Aalborg Søfarts- og Marinemuseum is a marine museum located on the wharf of Aalborg, Denmark. Inaugurated on 24 May 1992, by Margrethe II of Denmark, the museum's collections have been expanded considerably since opening. They now include an extensive collection of ship radios and navigation instruments, showing the development of such tools.
