= Rødvig Ship Motor Museum =

Museum in Rødvig, Denmark

Coordinates: 55.2551°N 12.3770°E

Rødvig Ship Motor Museum (Danish: Rødvig Skibsmotormuseum) is located in Rødvig on Zealand, Denmark. It is one of several technical museums in Denmark. The museum was started in 1987. As of 2013 the museum has a collection of approximately 400 different engines, produced mostly by now defunct Danish factories over the period 1898 to 1974. The engines range in size from small outboards up to one German MTU medium-sized diesel of 2 000 hp.

== History ==
At one time or another there were about 140 different producers of marine engines in Denmark. In 2013, only five of those 140 companies are still active: Hundested Propeller, Burmeister & Wain, Grenaa Motor Fabrik, Callesen Diesel (merged with Bukh), & Bukh Diesel (merged with Callesen). Engines from over half of the former 140 Danish producers can be found at the museum. Some of these are in working order and can be run within the museum. Four such ready-to-run engines are hot-bulb semi-diesel types from: "Tuxham", "Hein & Sons", "Dan", and "Danmark" (Rudkøbing). The museum exhibits comprise a spectrum of marine engine development from 1898 onwards, as well as charting the simultaneous slow decline towards near extinction of marine engine manufacture in Denmark.

The museum's collection includes many other maritime articles besides engines. The museum also has an archive with extensive documentation and technical material about various engines and their manufacturers. It commemorated its 25th anniversary in September 2012.

== Other Sources ==
- Køge Dagbladet, 4 September 2012, Sektion 2, Side 9
