= Norske Løve, Køge =

Building in Køge, Denmark

Norske Løve
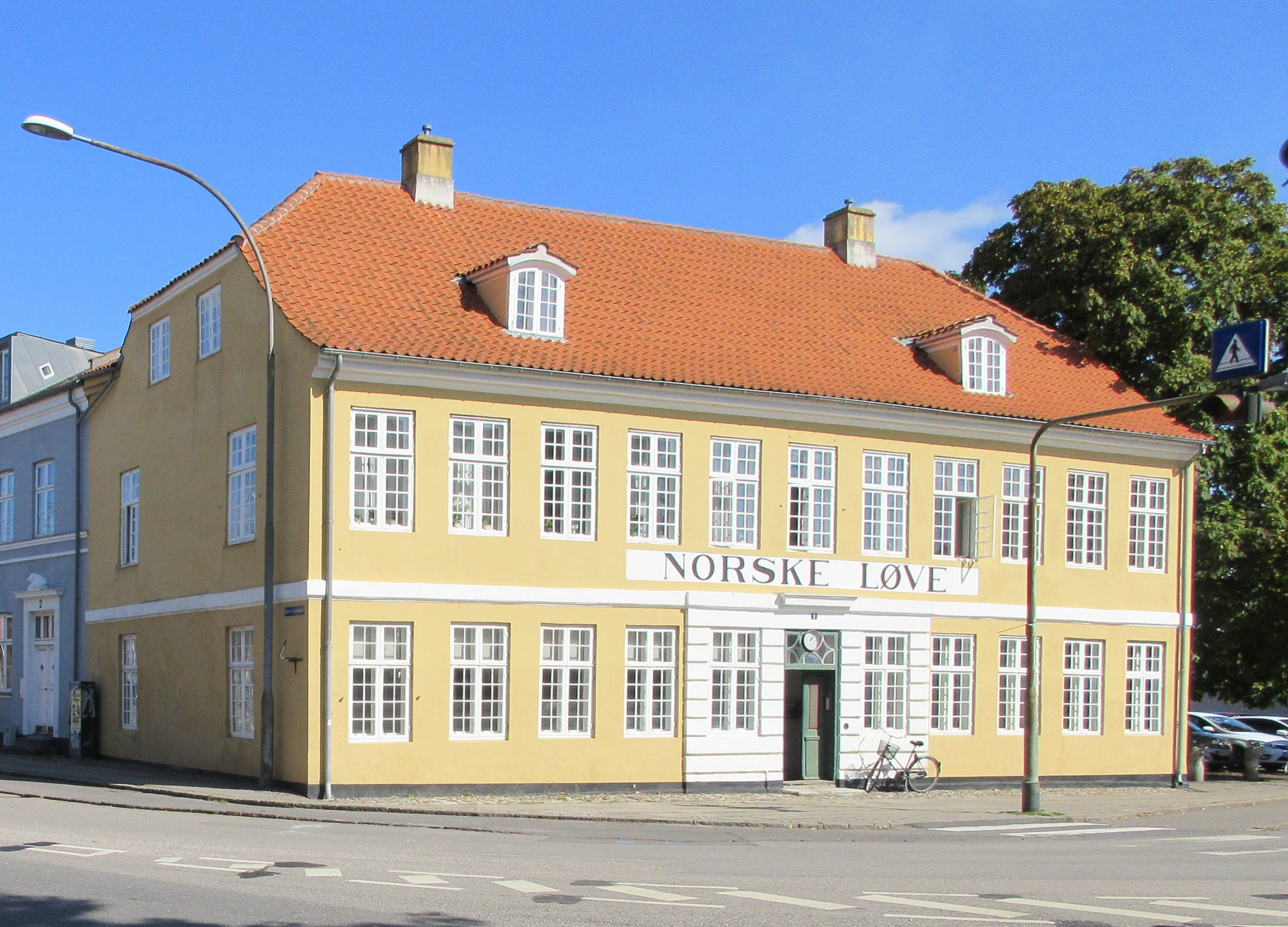
- Interactive map of the Norske Løve area

General information
- Location: Køge, Denmark
- Coordinates: 55°27′38.06″N 12°11′4.57″E
- Completed: 1801-1811

Norske Løve is a former mail and coaching inn in Køge, Denmark. It takes its name after the naval ship commanded by Niels Juel in the Battle of Køge Bay in 1677. The main wing from 1801-1811 is listed.

== History ==
An earlier building at the site was known as Ravnsborg after Mads Tavn, Køge's mayor, who owned it from 1630. During the Dano-Swedish War in 1658–1660, the building was demolished upon orders from the Swedish officer Erik Lyster.

In 1720, a new building was constructed on the site which in that day was still surrounded by fields. The town only continued as far north as Accisevej/Allegade. Town musician S. J.F.Krebs, who owned it from 1742, ran an illegit inn in the building. In 1759, after a renovation of the buildings, he obtained a royal license to operate a mail and coaching inn. It was given the name Norske Løve after one of the naval ships that participated in the Battle of Køge Bay on 1 July 1767. It was commanded by Niels Juel, had a crew of 568 men and was equipped with 86 canons. After S. J.F.Krebs' death, his widow married a chemist named Carl Hansen. Norske Løve developed into a popular excursion destination for people in Køge. The large garden, with fishing pond, music pavilion and an estrade for dancing, was often frequented by travelling fun fairs in the summer time. When the equestrian statue of Frederik VII was unveiled in 1862, Norske Løve hosted a dinner with 800 guests.

The current main wing was built some time between 1801 and 1811. From 1860, Norske Løve was home to Køge's first telegraph station.

In 1885, Norske Løve, which was still owned by the same family, lost its license. In 1924, Hotel Postgården opened in part of the building.

== Hans Christian Andersen inscription ==
In a letter to Signe Læssøe from July 1836, Hans Christian Andersen mentions how he once, when staying in Norske Løve, looked for an inscription in a window pane which he had heard about reading "Oh God Oh God in Køge". When he was unable to find it, he engraved the words himself, so that others would not have to search for it in vain. Both inscriptions are now on display in Køge Museum but whether they are authentic is unclear.
