= The Engine Collection =

Museum in Denmark

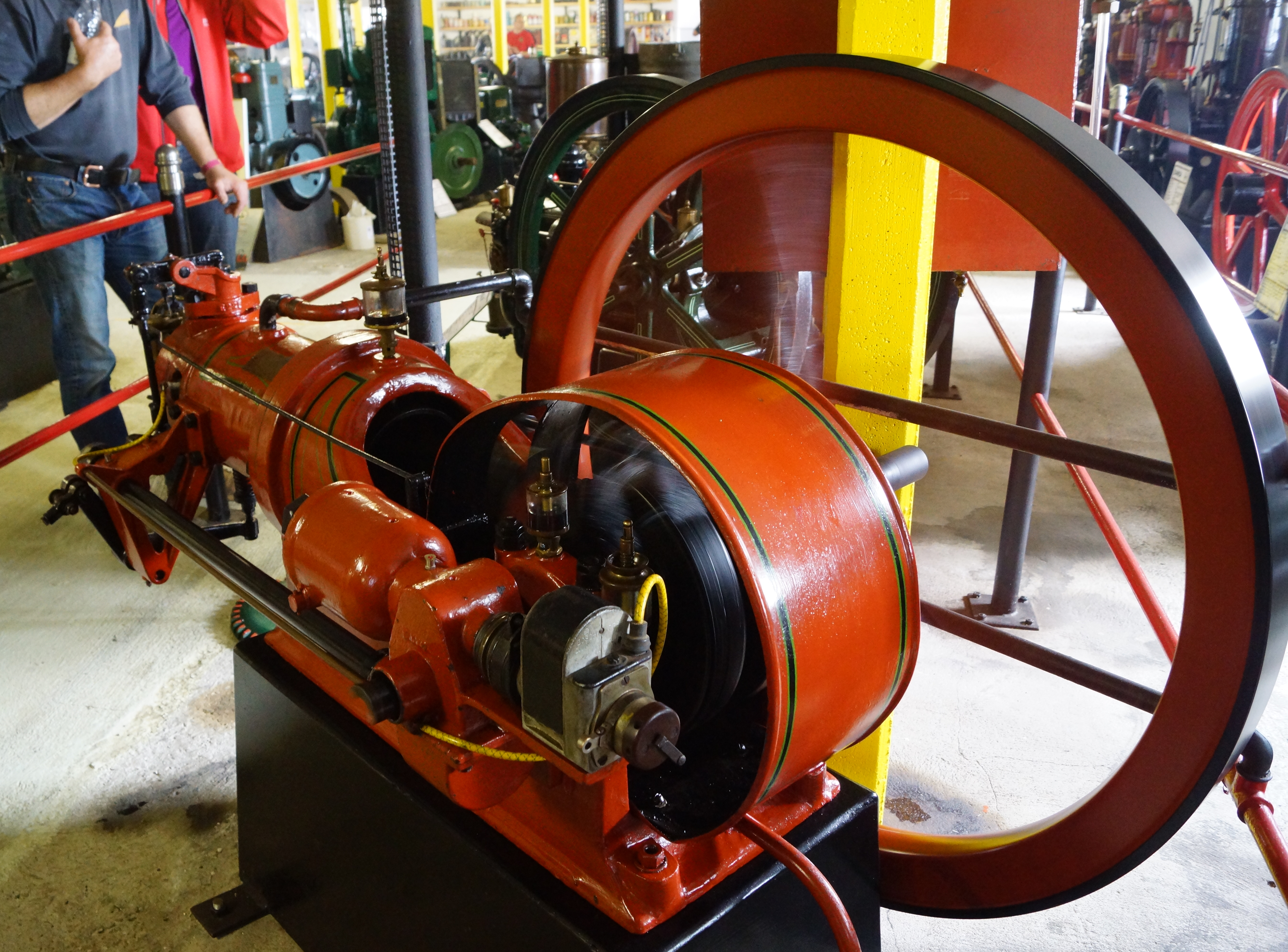
- The Holstebro Engine is a typical 1930 stationary engine design. One cylinder with an open crankcase and a large flywheel. Fuel: petrol/ kerosene. 8 Hp at 380 RPM.

- The Engine Collection, Denmark Northern Europe.
- Location: Norddjurs, Denmark
- Coordinates: 56°26′N 10°49′E
- Website: motorsamlingen.dk

The Engine Collection (Danish: Dansk Motor- og Maskinsamling) is a museum located in Grenå, Denmark. It holds Northern Europe's largest collection of stationary engines, featuring over 450 engines on display, the majority of which have been restored and remain operational.

The museum operates a dedicated machine shop for the dismantling, restoration, and rebuilding of engines, including the fabrication of replacement parts when necessary. In addition to its engine collection, the institution showcases historical machinery. One notable example is a band saw-based sawmill powered by a Bukh engine, utilizing an intricate belt drive system that connects the indoor engine to the outdoor sawmill.

== Organization ==
The Engine Collection is a foundation operated by volunteers with specialized skills, including mechanical specialists skilled in engine restoration. Restoration work often involves intricate processes, such as milling new cylinders, pistons, and glow heads using the original contours of corroded components as reference. Additionally, the team fabricates replacement parts for those that are missing, damaged, or degraded.

The collection is supported by a dedicated club of members, many of whom have professional backgrounds in engine construction, metalworking, or related industries. Others contribute technical expertise or resources essential to maintaining and expanding the museum's mechanical restoration efforts.

=== Funding and operations ===
The museum relies on donations from private sponsors and foundations in technology-related industries, particularly those invested in preserving technological history. Contributions fund equipment, labor, and logistical projects. For example, in one instance, the relocation of three large Burmeister & Wain (B&W) engines from the abandoned military island of Flakfortet in the Øresund Strait required a donated ship transport operation involving a tugboat, cranes, and a flatbed trailer. The flywheel of one such engine weighs approximately 1.5 metric tons.

=== Notable artifacts ===
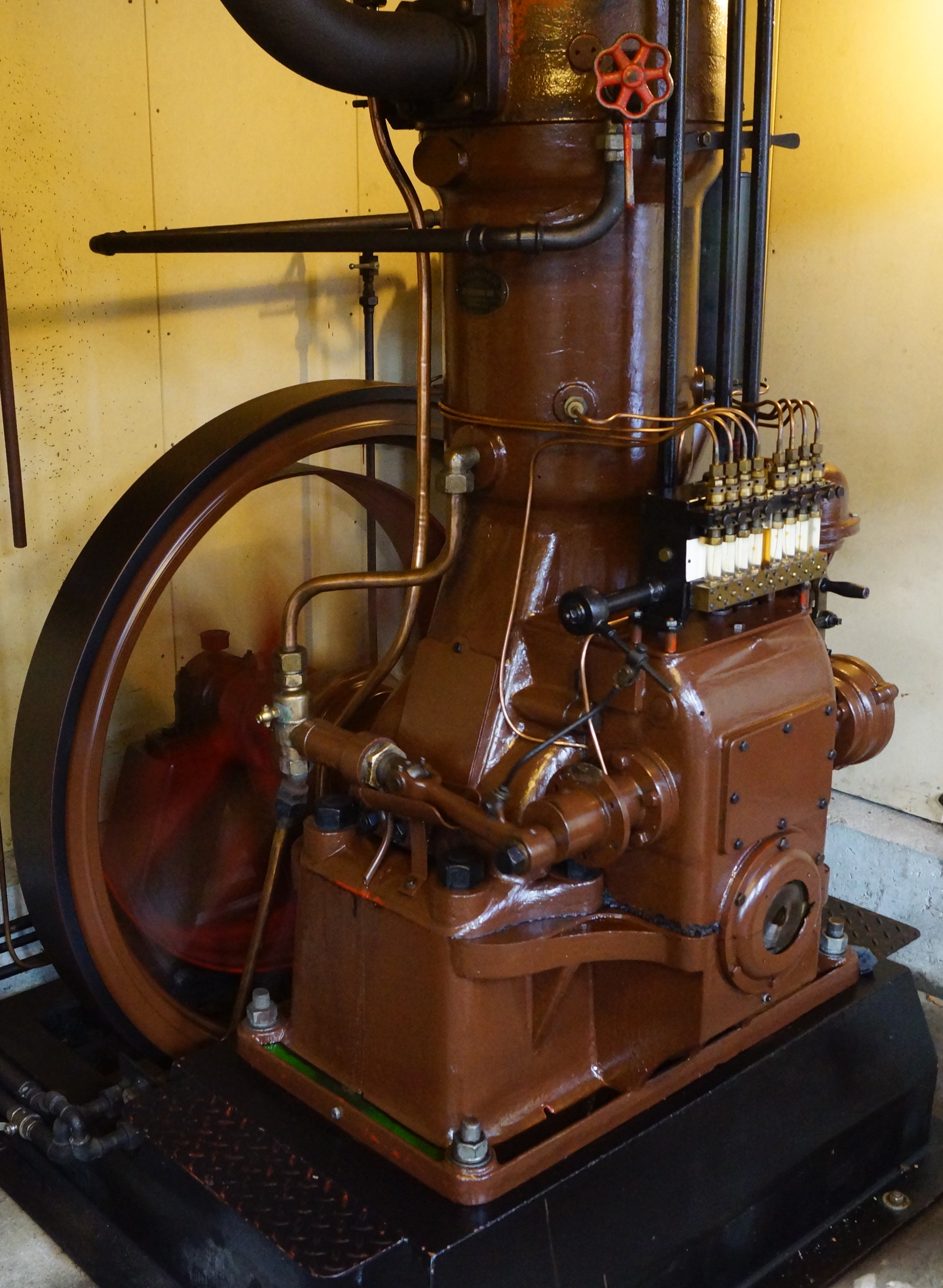
This Danish Rudolf Kramper engine may be the only one left in the World.

Among its rare holdings is a Danish Rudolf Kramper engine, which may be the sole surviving example of its kind worldwide.

== Exhibition ==
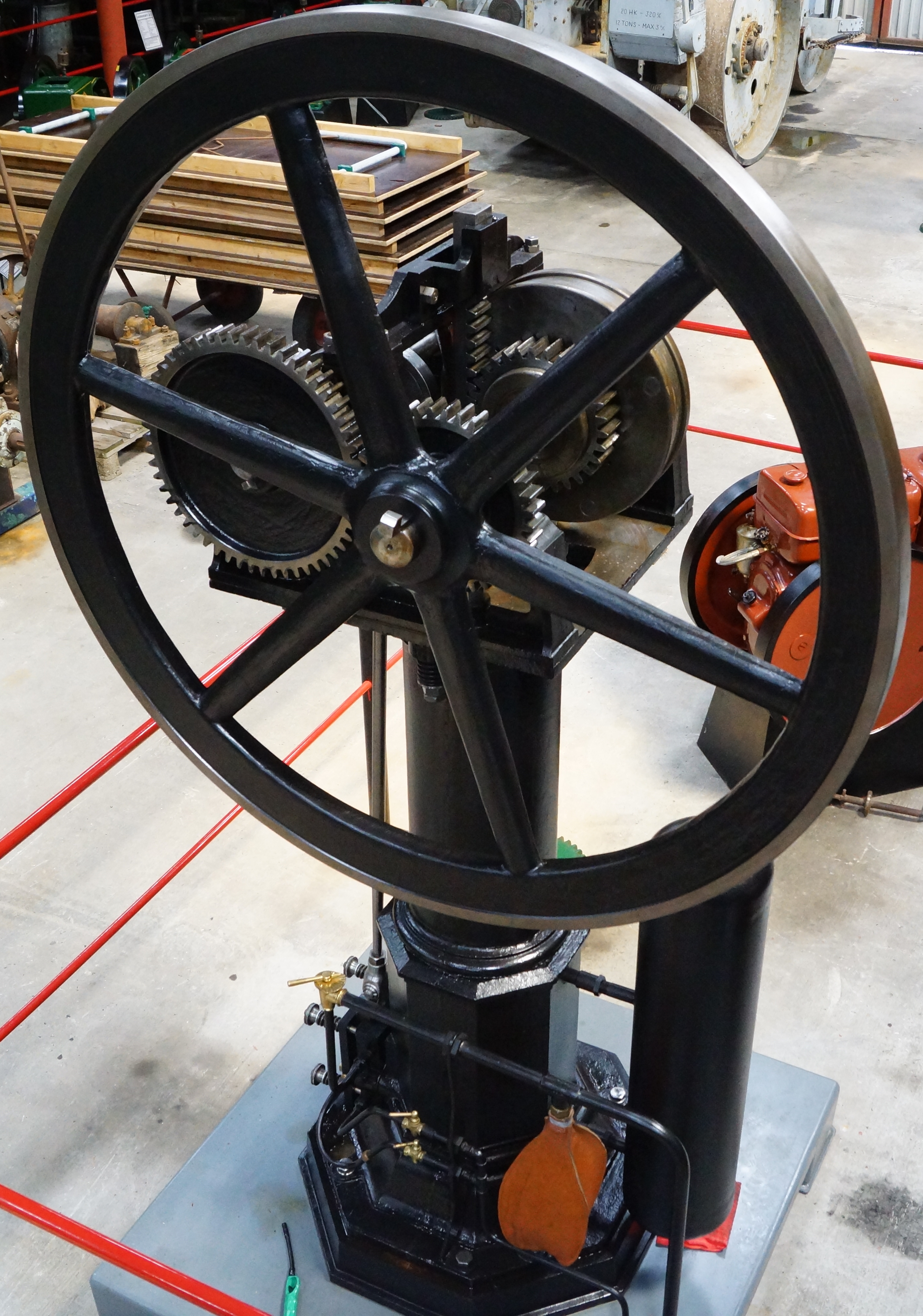
The atmospheric vertical canon Otto & Langen-engine from 1868 is one of the world's oldest internal combustion engines.

The Engine Collection's exhibition spans multiple buildings, which are periodically expanded to accommodate its growing holdings. Its primary focus is stationary internal combustion engines, ranging from the 1868 Otto & Langen atmospheric engine—one of the world's oldest surviving internal combustion engines—to mid-20th-century models (1960–1970). While the museum emphasizes Danish-engineered examples, it also restores and displays international models, reflecting how manufacturers historically borrowed and adapted concepts across borders.

=== Notable artifacts ===
The 1868 Otto & Langen atmospheric engine operates on a vertical "free-piston" principle. Town gas ignites in a combustion chamber, propelling a piston upward. After the explosion, exhaust gas contraction and gravity pull the piston downward, creating a vacuum that drives the engine. Power transfer is achieved via handcrafted cogged wheels, with engine speed regulated by an exhaust valve. Notably, the design lacks a camshaft. This engine, on loan from the Danish Technical Museum and restored by The Engine Collection, is considered among the earliest surviving internal combustion engines.

The Otto-Motor (later synonymous with the four-stroke engine) was developed by Nikolaus August Otto (1832–1891) nearly a decade after his work on the atmospheric engine. The four-stroke principle remains foundational to modern internal combustion engines, including automobile engines.

=== Logistical challenges ===
Relocating multi-ton engines from industrial sites to the museum often requires complex operations. In 2002, three corroded and vandalized Burmeister & Wain (B&W) DM 220 diesel engines (1914) were transported from the abandoned Flakfortet military bunker on an uninhabited Øresund island. The operation involved a tugboat, cranes, and a flatbed trailer.

=== Operations ===
Engines in the collection are regularly operated during public events, demonstrations, and for pre-booked groups.

== Power source development ==
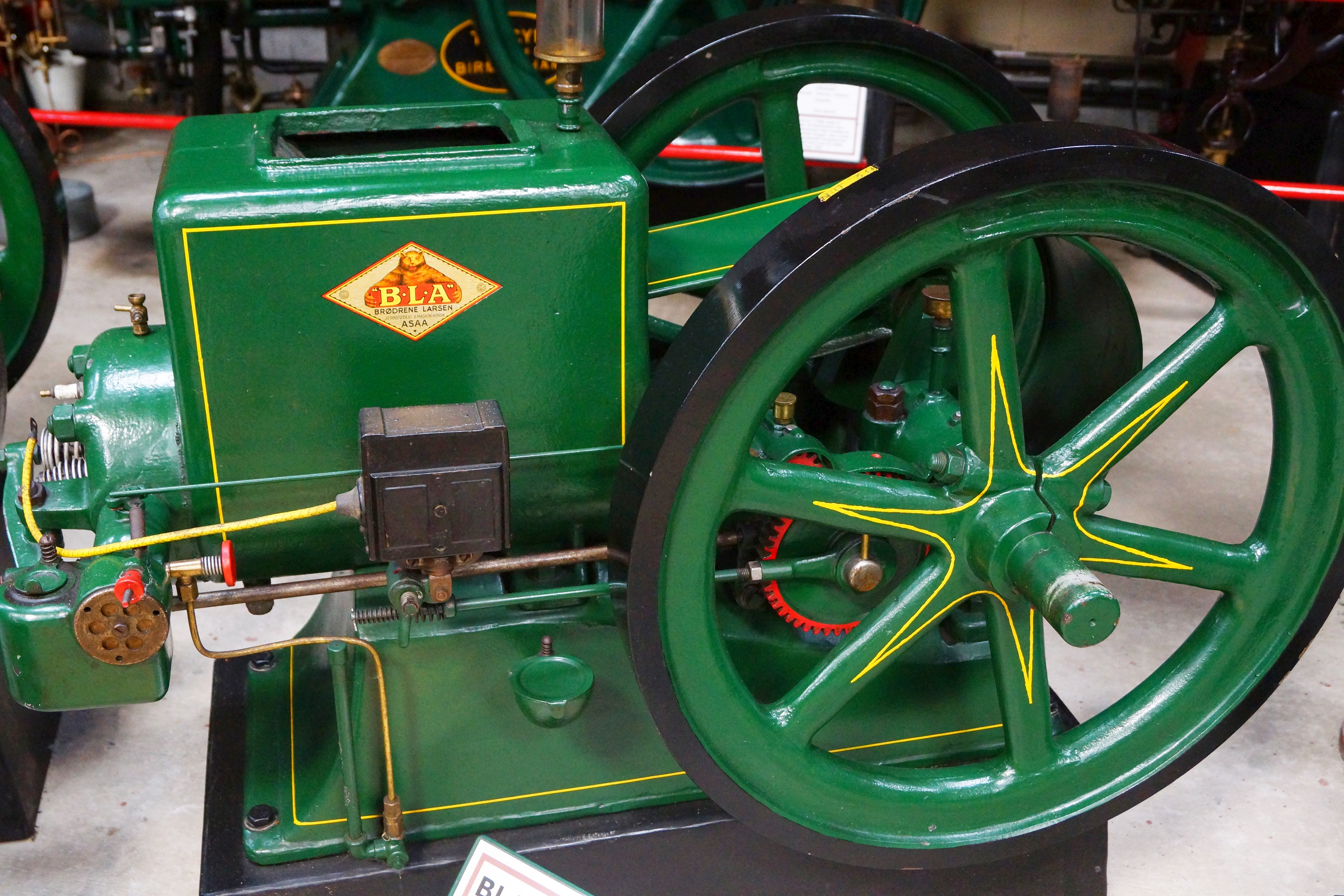
Small stationary engines under 10 Hp, like this cast iron Danish B.L.A.-motor where typical for farm-use before electrification introduced the electric motor.

Following the decline of steam engines and prior to widespread electrification, stationary internal combustion engines became a critical power source for industry and agriculture. In Denmark, the transition to electric motors—which offered greater compactness and lower maintenance—occurred primarily between 1920 and 1950.

=== Small-scale engines in agriculture ===
Small stationary engines (under 10 hp), such as the cast-iron Danish B.L.A.-motor, were typical for farm use before electrification. These engines were often housed in dedicated machine sheds and operated at least twice daily to power compressors for milking equipment. They also drove machinery like threshers, grinding mills, and other farm tools.

Denmark's agricultural sector, a major exporter of goods like bacon and butter to England during this period, relied heavily on these engines. The Engine Collection holds a wide range of 2–10 hp stationary engines, reflecting their historical significance to Danish farming and industry.

=== Danish engine manufacturing ===
The museum's emphasis on Danish engines stems from the country's prolific industrialization between 1890 and 1930, when over 200 domestic manufacturers produced stationary engines—many operating their own foundries. Among these, Burmeister & Wain (B&W) emerged as a global leader; by the late 1920s, the company held nearly 50% of the worldwide market for marine diesel engines.

B&W's large diesel engines were also used as stationary power sources in factories and electricity plants. Initially, they drove machinery via belt systems, but later applications shifted to powering generators that distributed electricity through cables.

== Ongoing projects ==
The museum's website features an Ongoing Projects section (available in Danish with accompanying photographs), where visitors can track current restoration efforts. Notable examples include a 1971 IF Fleetstar 2050A truck equipped with a V-8 engine and an ashwood-framed cabin.

A Danish Eickhoff engine (1887) was restored and completed in 2014. The collection also includes rare or unique artifacts, such as a 1927 Rudolf Kramper engine, which may be the sole surviving example of its kind.
