= Viking Museum (Aarhus) =

Coordinates: 56.1566°N 10.2089°E

- Vikingemuseet
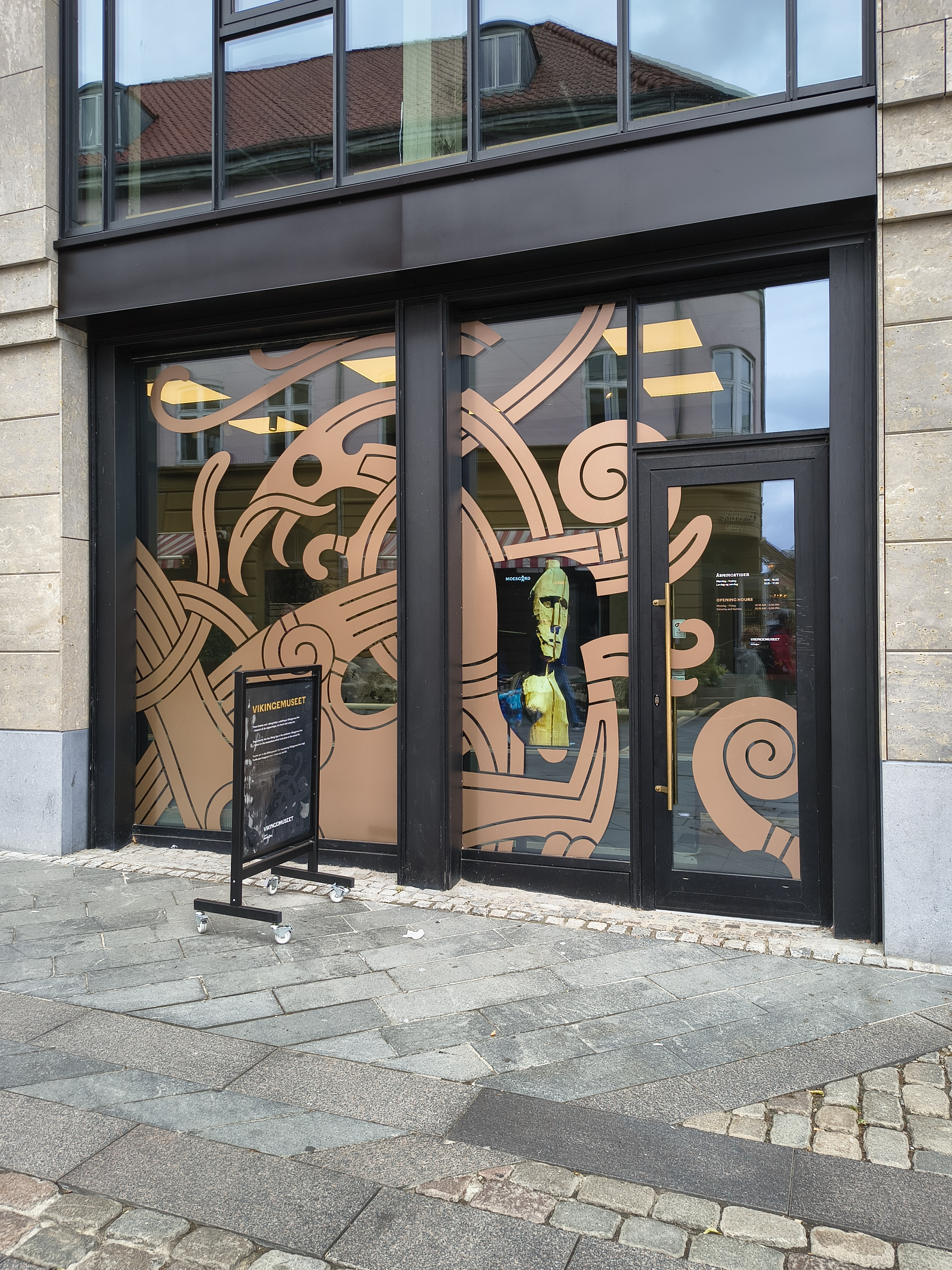
- Viking Museum
- Established: 1968
- Location: Skt. Clemens Torv 6, Århus; Denmark
- Type: History museum
- Website: Viking Museum

The Viking Museum (Danish: Vikingemuseet) is a small underground museum in central Aarhus, Denmark. It is located at Sankt Clemens Torv (square of St. Clement), beneath the Nordea bank building. The Viking Museum is administered by the Moesgård Museum and financed by both Aarhus Municipality and Nordea.

== History ==
The museum was established in 1968, after archaeologists from the Moesgård Museum had excavated the site in 1963-1964 in connection with the construction of an office building. The museum underwent a renovation in 2008.

The Viking Museum is in situ, ie. situated upon the very site of the archaeological excavations it exhibits. The excavations conducted in the 1960s, 3 m (9.8 ft) below street level, revealed various Viking Age structures, items, and parts of a human skeleton. The museum provides information regarding the history of Viking Age Aarhus in general and also features copies of items on display at the much larger Moesgaard Museum to the south of Aarhus.

== Gallery ==
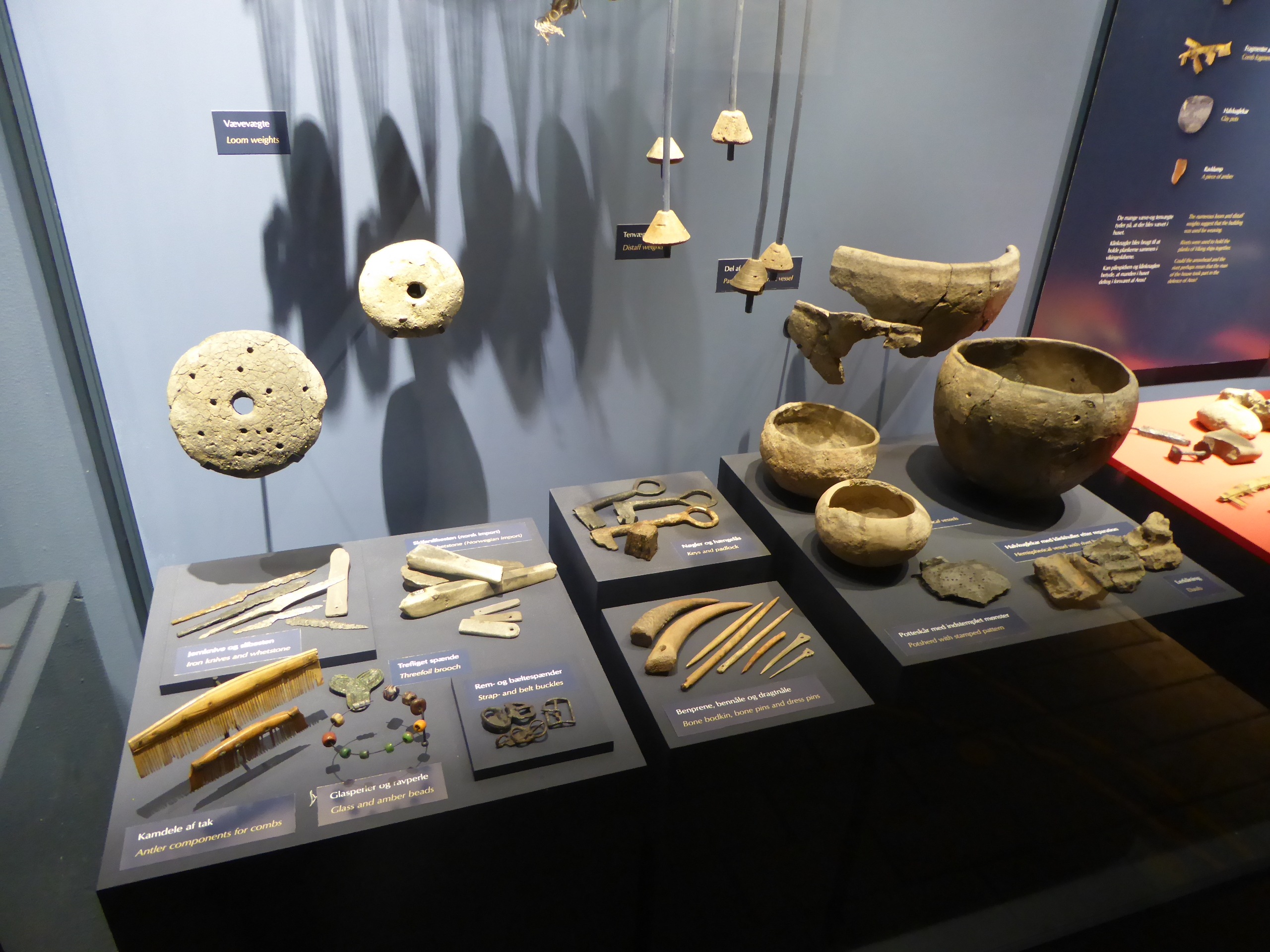
Viking Era display at Vikingemuseet

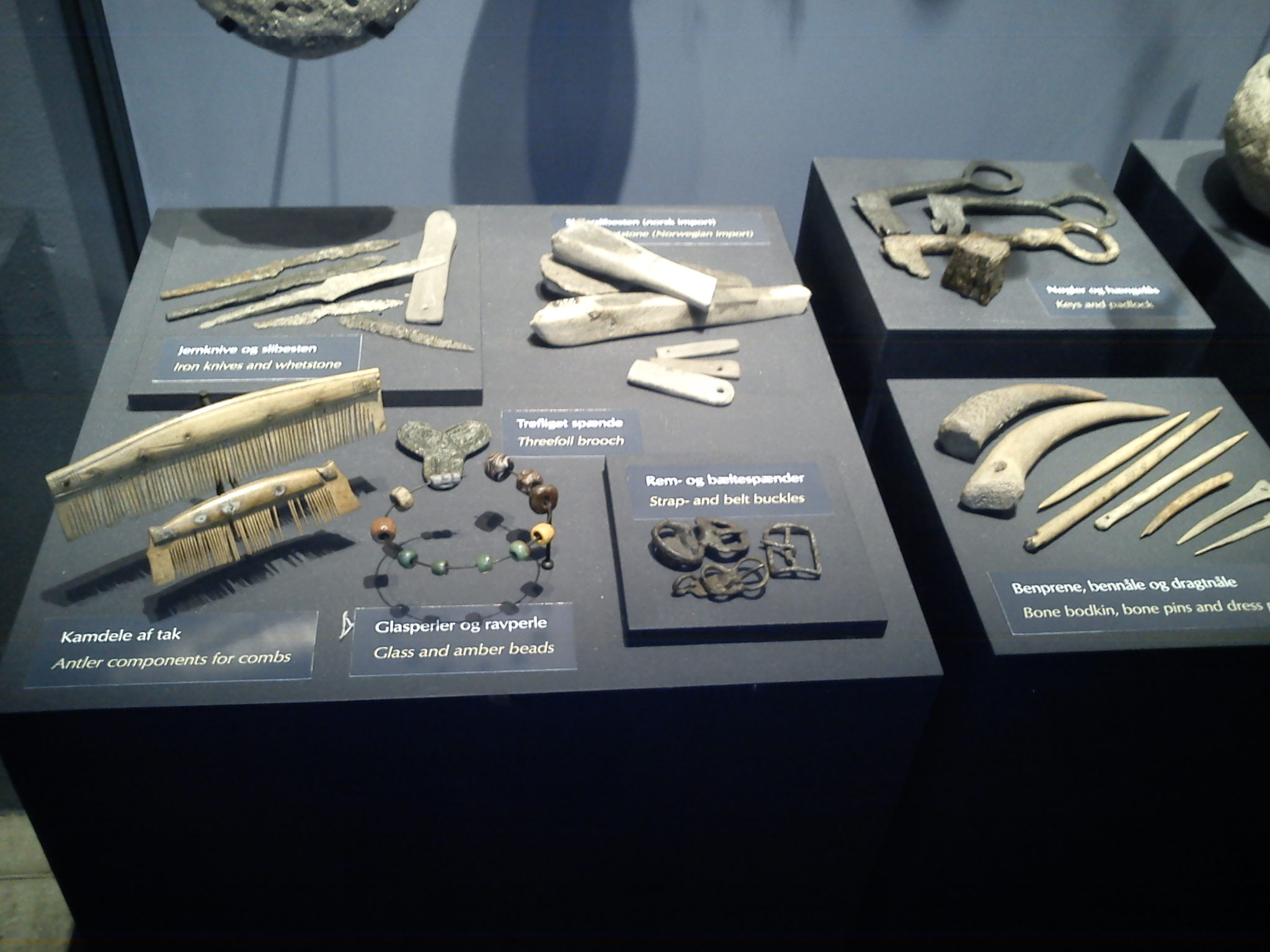
Display of everyday items

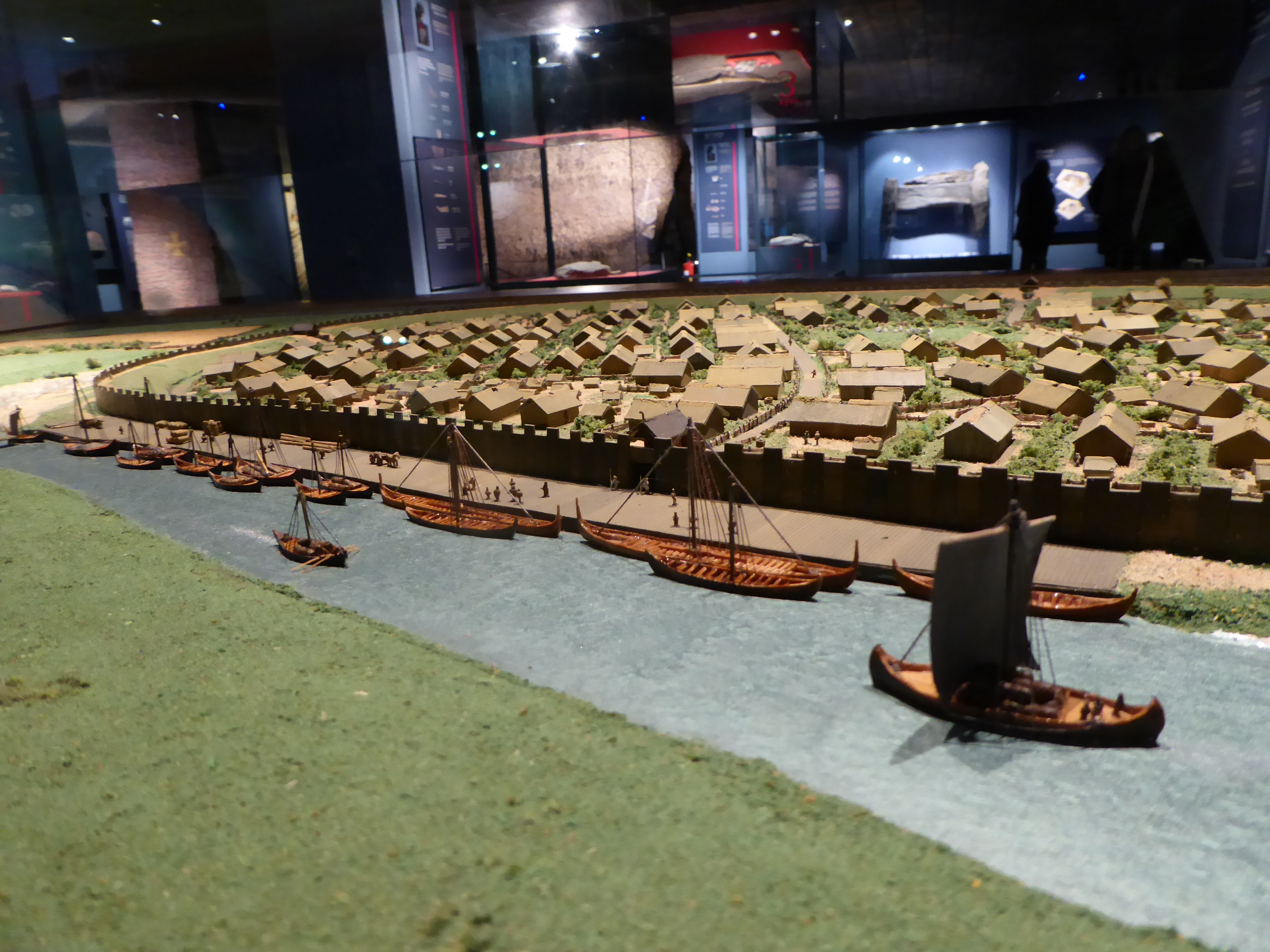
Scale model of Aarhus in the Viking Age

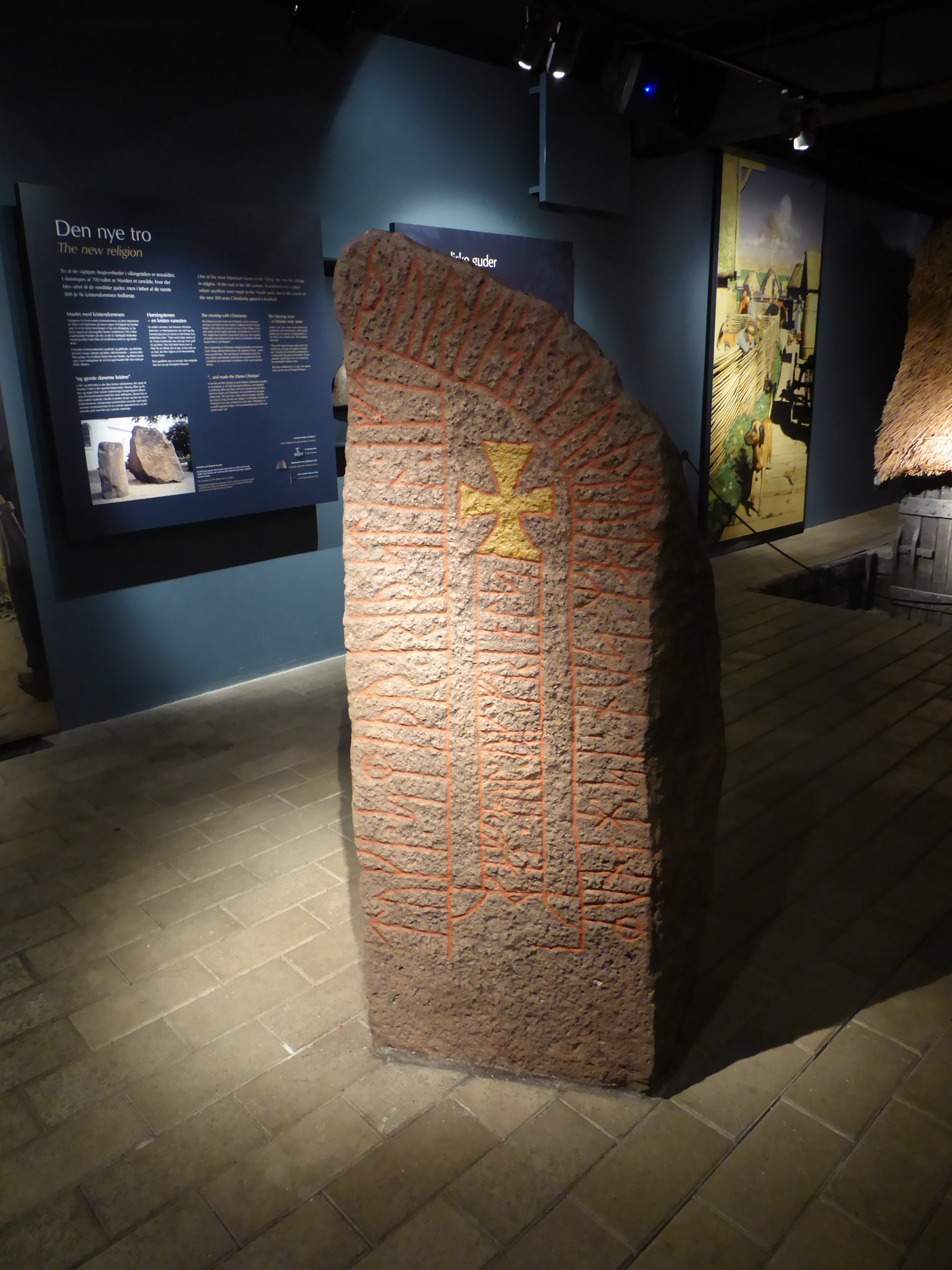
Viking Age runestone

== See also ==
- Viking Ship Museum (Roskilde)
- Viking Ship Museum (Oslo)
