= Køge Museum =

Local history museum in Køge, Denmark

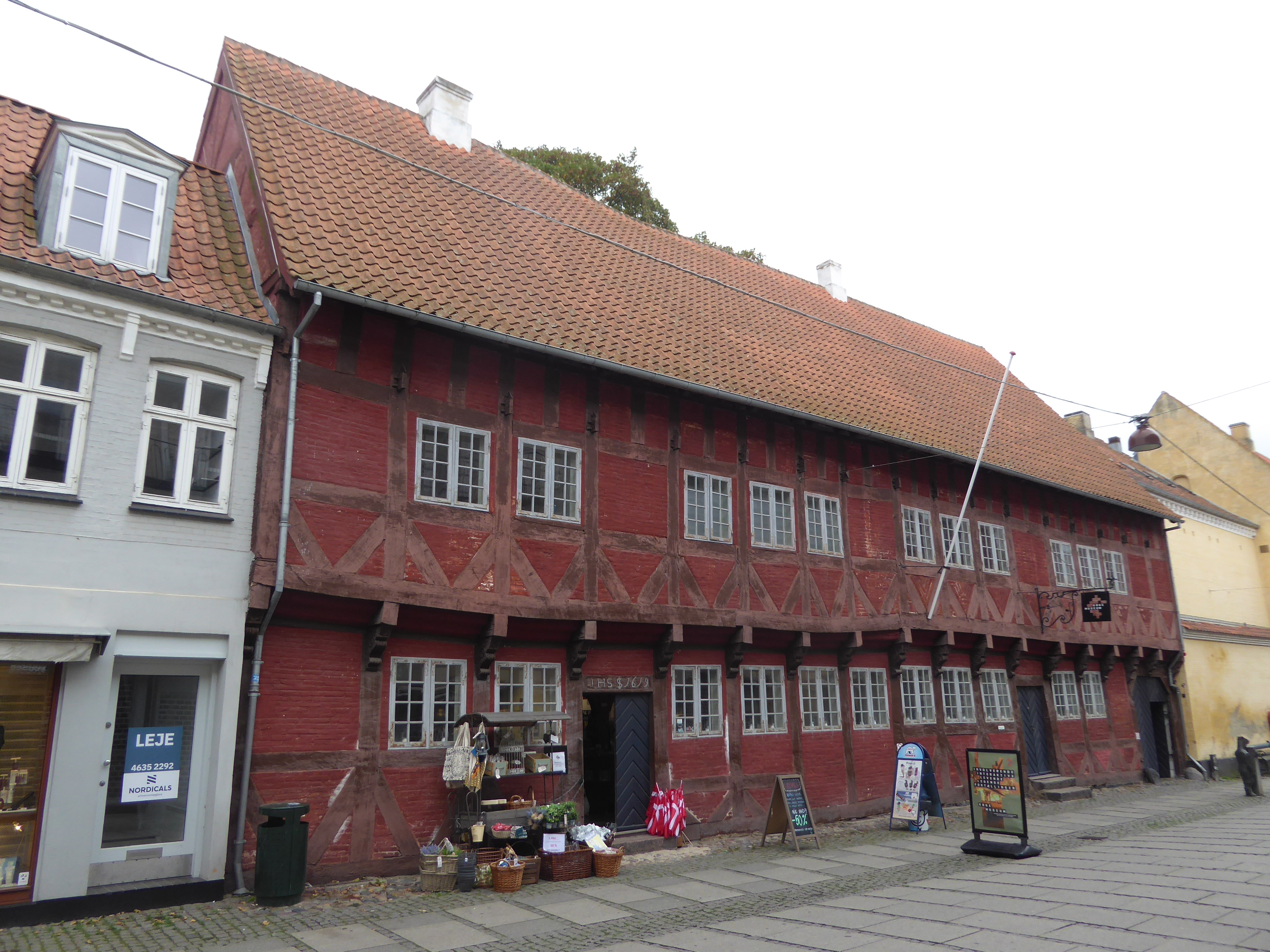
- The building in Nørregade
- Location: Nørregade 4, Køge, Denmark
- Coordinates: 55.4569°N 12.183068°E
- Website: Official website

Køge Museum is a local history museum in Køge, Denmark.

== Building ==
The museum is based in a two-storey, half-timbered building from the 16th century. A long side wing to the rear of the main wing forms the last remains of a larger complex which surrounded two interior courtyards.

== Garden ==
To the rear of the main wing is a garden with a small playground. It is accessible through the gate with ticket to the museum.
