= Museums in Aalborg =

Artefacts in Denmark

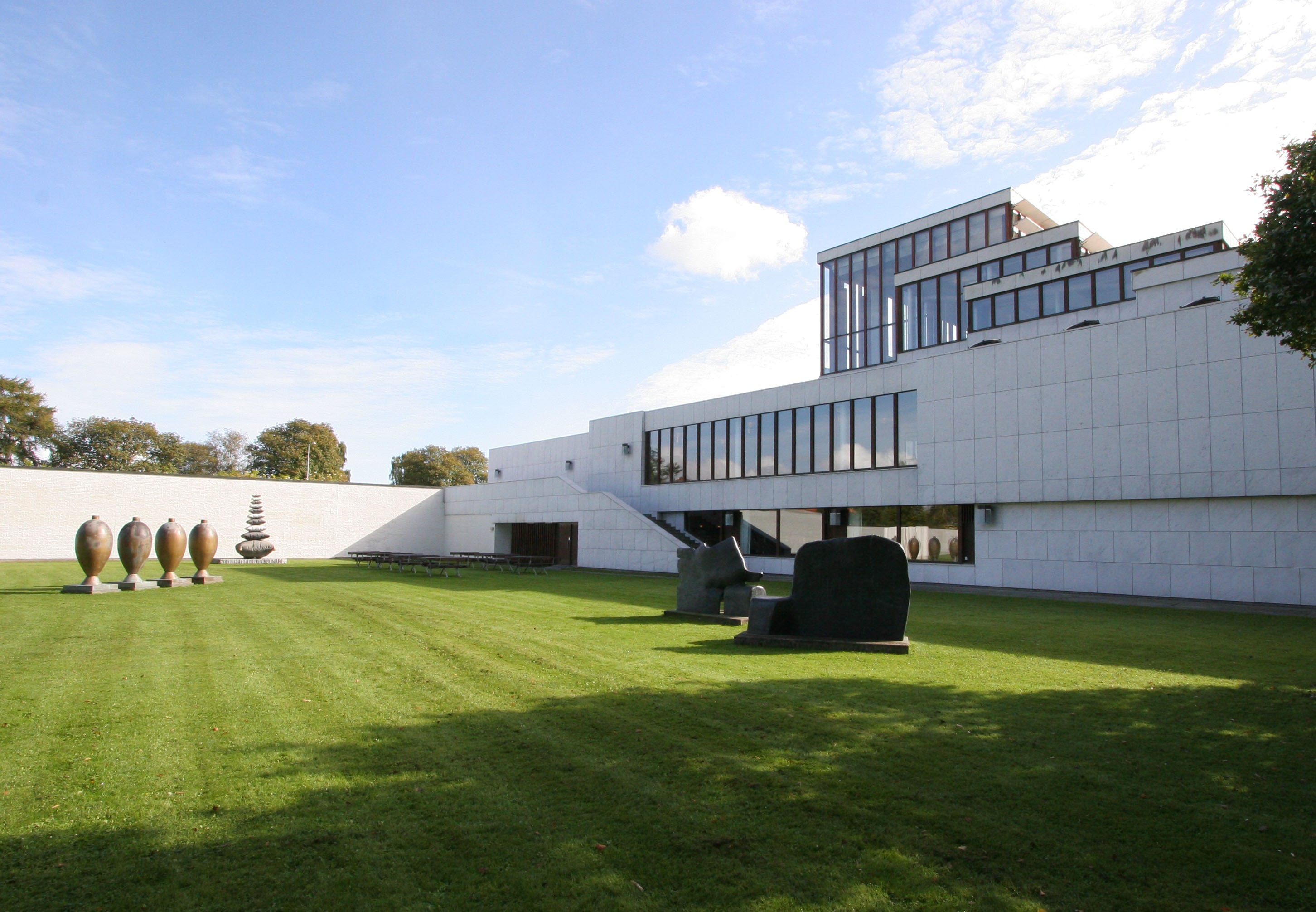
The Museum of Modern Art and its sculpture garden

There are several museums in Aalborg, Denmark. These include a museum of modern art, a historical museum and a maritime museum. Together with the city's theatre, cultural centre and music interests, they constitute an important aspect of the municipality's recent focus on knowledge and culture.

== History ==
The Aalborg Historical Museum in the city centre was established in 1863 making it one of the earliest provincial museums in Denmark. Excavations in the 1950s revealed Iron Age and Viking artifacts from burial sites at Lindholm Høje just north of Limfjord. In the mid-1990s, the foundations of the Greyfriars Monastery were investigated in the city centre, both leading to smaller museums. The striking museum of modern art was completed in the early 1970s, to be followed in 1992 by a marine museum and in 2002 by a defence museum.

Over the years, the Historical Museum's administration developed into the North Jutland Historical Museum (Nordjyllands Historiske Museum), a system administered by a 12-member committee made up of representatives of the constituent organisations, including the Museum Society of Hadsund, the Museum Society for Hals Kommune, the Aalborg History Association, the North Jutland Association of Archaeology for Jutland, the Historical Community of Himmerland and Kjaer District, and the Cultural Historic Society of North Jutland.

== Museums ==
=== Aalborg Historical Museum ===
The first building for the Aalborg Historical Museum (1863) was designed by Conrad Weber in 1863. The present museum was constructed in 1878 and expanded in the early 1890s to house the growing collection of items from the region's earliest inhabitants to modern times. The Aalborgstuen presents a fine Renaissance interior from 1602.

=== Kunsten Museum of Modern Art ===
The Kunsten Museum of Modern Art was built between 1968 and 1972 after designs by Elissa Aalto, Alvar Aalto and Jean-Jacques Baruël. The design is said to be inspired by the ziggurat. The structure extends over 6,000 m^{2} (65,000 sq ft), with galleries organised around a central hall. The external walls and most of the pavement are of Carrara marble. The building materials have light colours to emphasise the art works. The outdoor areas include a sculpture park, amphitheatre and terrace. Some of the sculptures exhibited are by Gunnar Aagaard Andersen, Willy Ørskov, Lene Adler Petersen and Mogens Møller. The collection consists of around 1,500 art objects, including paintings, sculptures and other forms of artistic media.

=== Greyfriars Monastery Museum ===
In 1994 and 1995, excavations at the site of the 11th-century Greyfriars Monastery in central Aalborg resulted in the creation of the Greyfriars Monastery Museum (Gråbrødrekloster Museum) underneath the central pedestrian shopping street. Inside the well-preserved foundations, the museum reveals the history of the monastery, the town and former houses and churches.

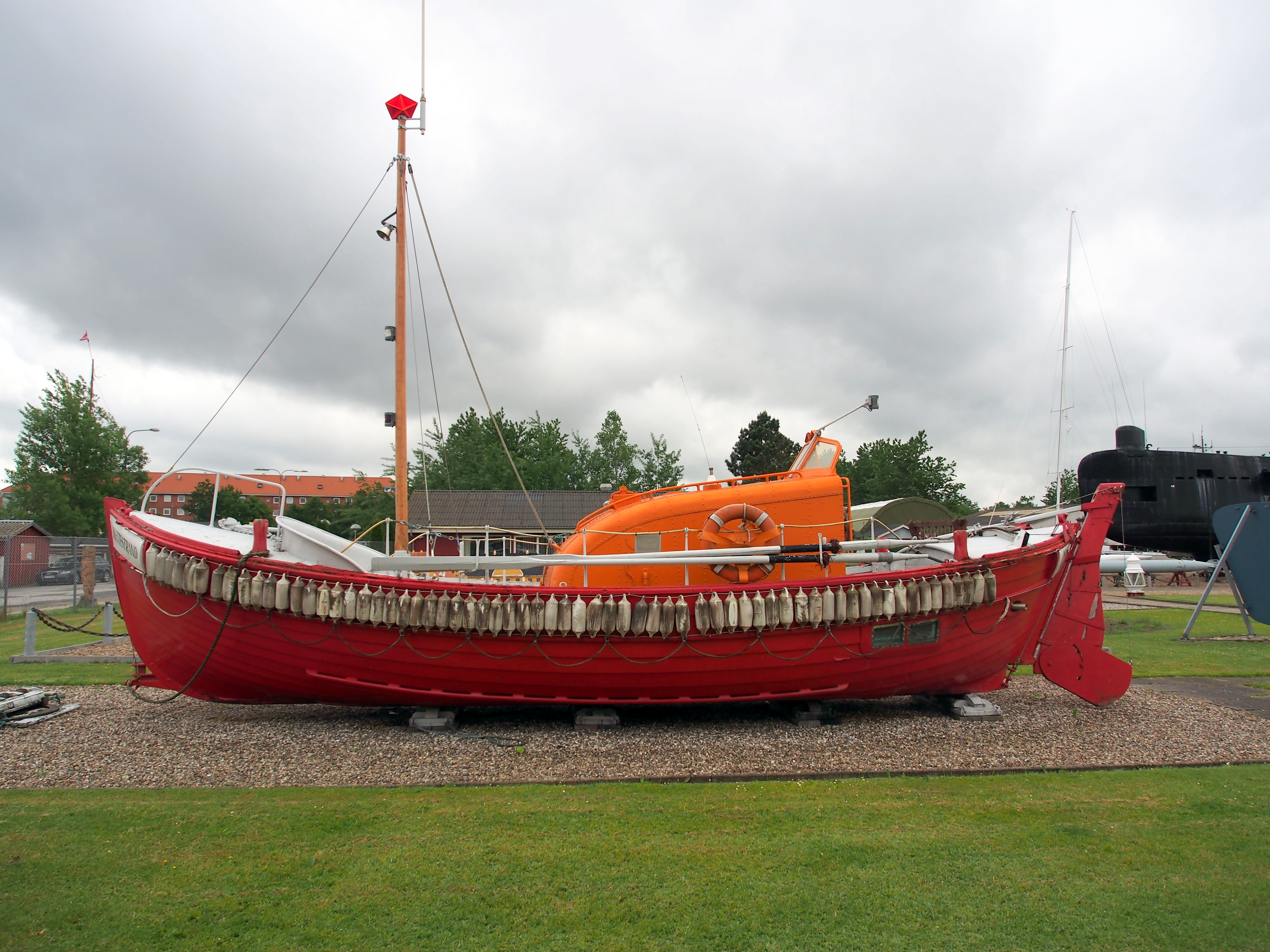
Marinemuseum

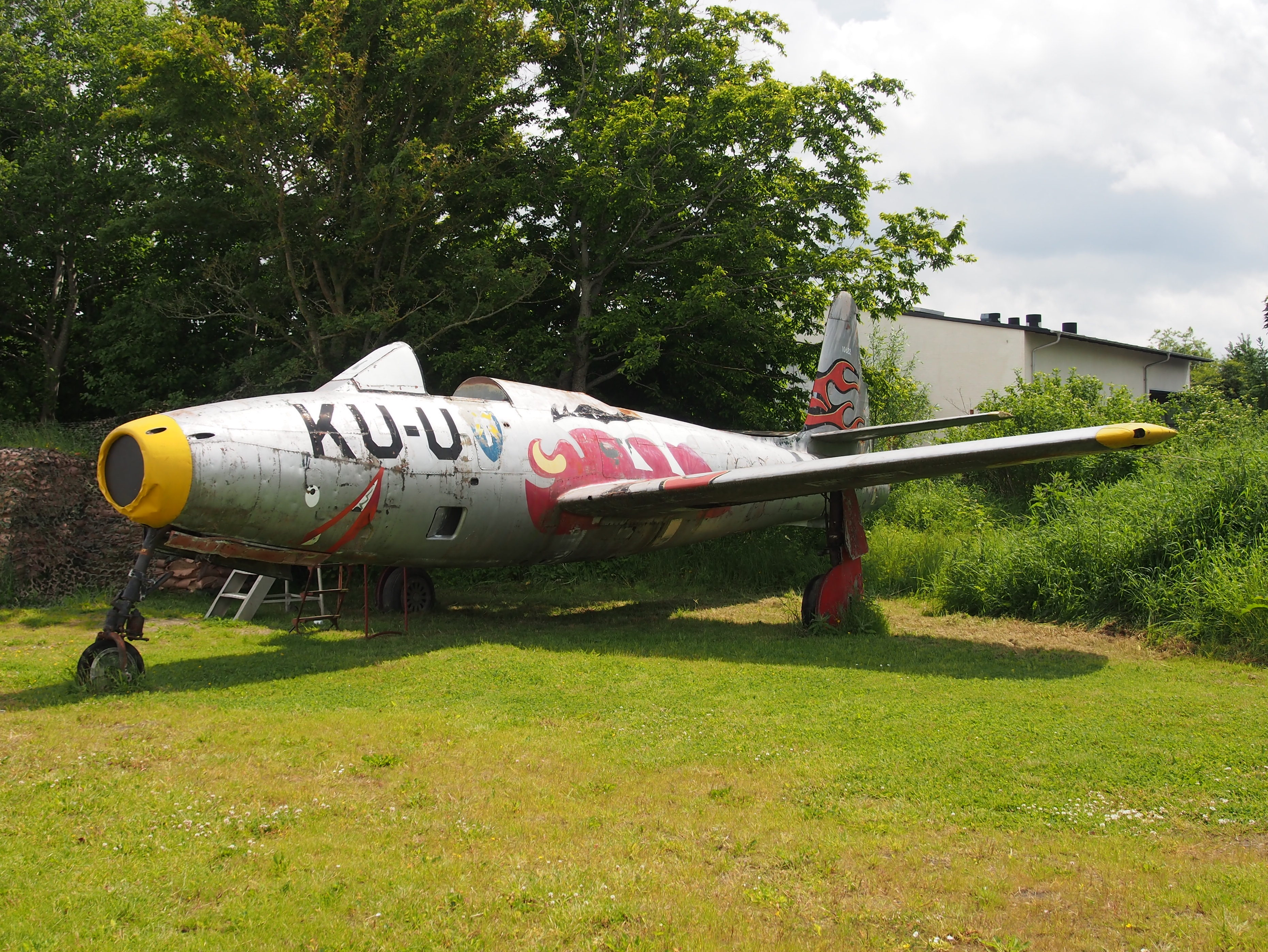
Garnisonsmuseum

=== Springeren - Marine Experience Center ===
The Springeren - Marine Experience Center is a marine museum on the wharf of Aalborg. Inaugurated on 24 May 1992, in the presence of Queen Margrethe, the museum's collections have since been expanded considerably, especially with an extensive collection of ship radios and navigation instruments, showing the development of such tools. The main attraction is the Danish submarine "Springeren".

=== Aalborg Defence and Garrison Museum ===
The Aalborg Defence and Garrison Museum documents Danish defences during the Second World War as well as the history of Aaborg's garrison since 1779. The museum is in a historic building in the western part of Aalborg - a huge hangar with side buildings, erected by the German occupation forces in 1940 at the seaplane base Seefliegerhorst Aalborg.

=== Lindholm Høje Museum ===
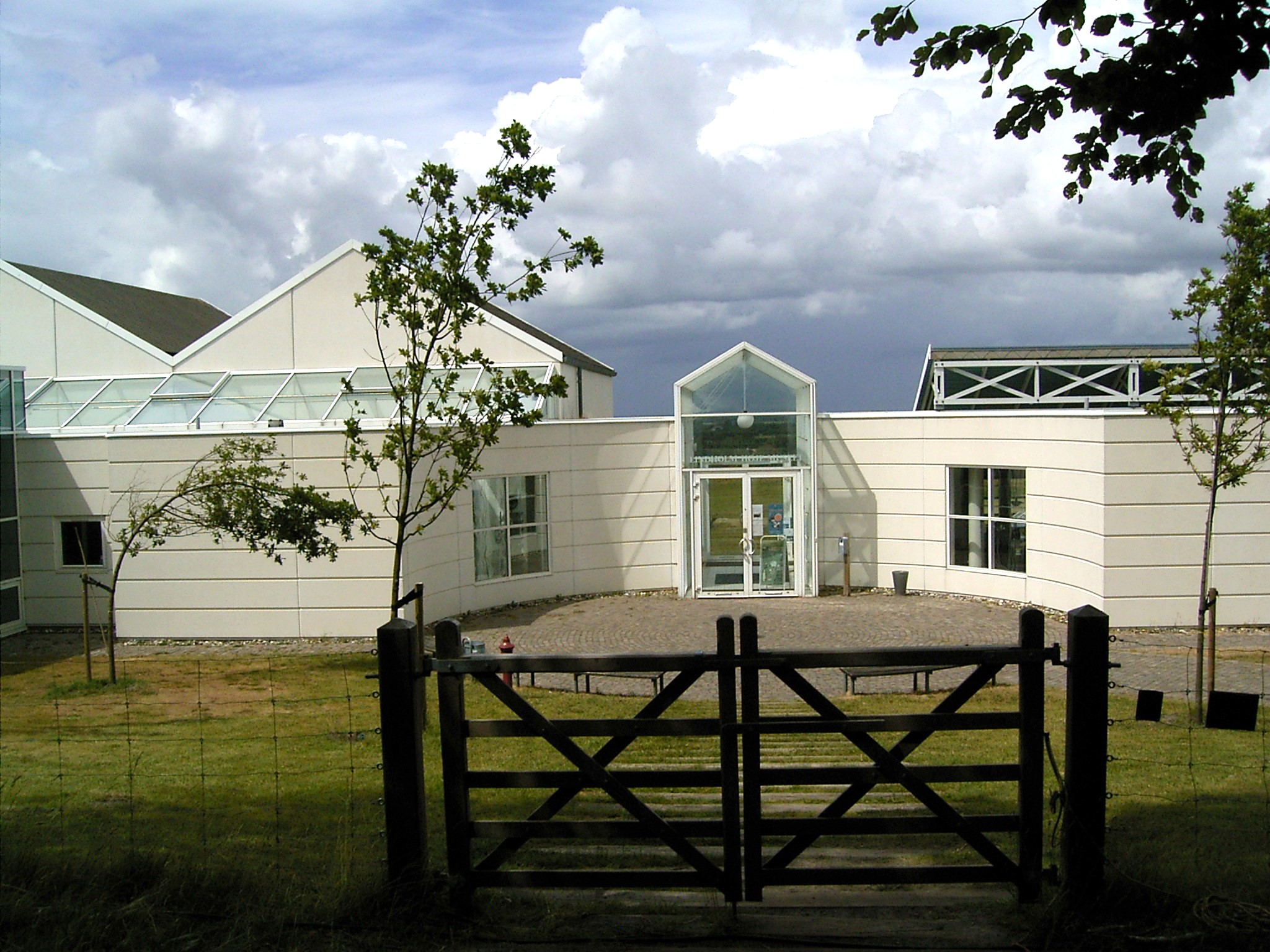
Lindholm Høje Museum

In the 1950s, the Nordjyllands Museum conducted a series of archaeological excavations at Iron Age and Viking sites in the area, including the extensive burial sites at Lindholm Høje near Nørresundby on the north side of the fjord. In 1992, thanks to funding by Aalborg Portland, a museum was opened on the site and extended in 2008 following a grant from A.P. Møller. It presents many of the findings from the excavations as well as displays illustrating life in the Viking period and in earlier settlements.
