= Aalborg Historical Museum =

Historical and cultural museum in Denmark

Coordinates: 57°2′53.30″N 9°55′4″E

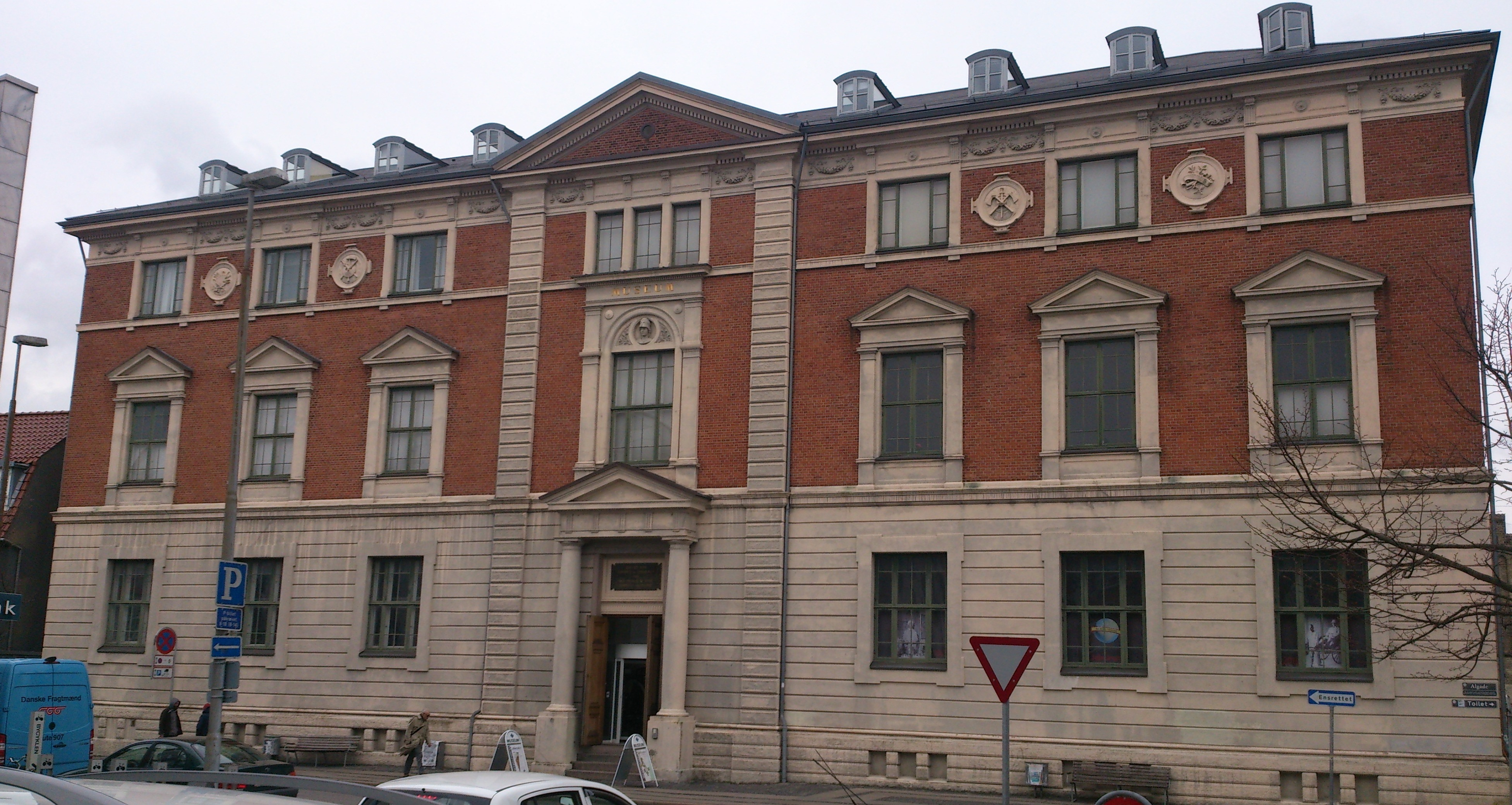
- Aalborg Historiske Museum
- Established: 1863
- Type: Historical and cultural museum

Aalborg Historical Museum (Danish: Aalborg Historiske Museum) is a historical and cultural museum in the city of Aalborg in Denmark. The museum was established in 1863 and is now part of The Historical Museum of Northern Jutland (Nordjyllands Historiske Museum).

== History ==
Aalborg Historical Museum was organized to explain the history of the city and the surrounding region for the past 1000 years. It was established in 1863, making it one of the earliest provincial museums in Denmark. The present museum was constructed in 1878 and expanded in the early 1890s to house the growing collection of items from the region's earliest inhabitants to modern times.

Aalborg Historical Museum has rotating exhibitions from its large collections and is particularly noted for its fine silver and glass collections. The museum also has a large collection of clothing and textiles items from the 18th century to the present.

Of particular interest is the Aalborgstuen 1602. This well-preserved Renaissance paneled wooden room is claimed to be 'The best preserved middle class Renaissance interior' in Denmark.

In the 1950s Aalborg Historical Museum, conducted a series of archaeological excavations at Iron Age and Viking sites in the area, including Lindholm Høje, resulting ultimately in Lindholm Høje Museet at Lindholm Høje.

In 1994 and 1995 the museum conducted excavations at the site of the former Greyfriars Friary (gråbrødrekloster) in central Aalborg. The excavations resulted in the creation of the "in situ" underground Gråbrødrekloster Museum (Gråbrødrekloster Museet).

== Recent history ==
In 2004 several organizations banded together to form The Historical Museum of Northern Jutland. The museum system is administered by a 12-member committee made of members from the constituent organizations which make up the museum. These include: The Museum Society of Hadsund, the Museum Society for Hals Kommune, the Aalborg History Association, the North Jutland Association of Archaeology for Jutland, the Historical Community of Himmerland and Kjaer District, and the Cultural Historic Society of North Jutland. The umbrella organization coordinates research, outreach programs, educational programs, as well as manages the many properties in North Jutland which have been preserved by the various organizations.

== Gallery ==
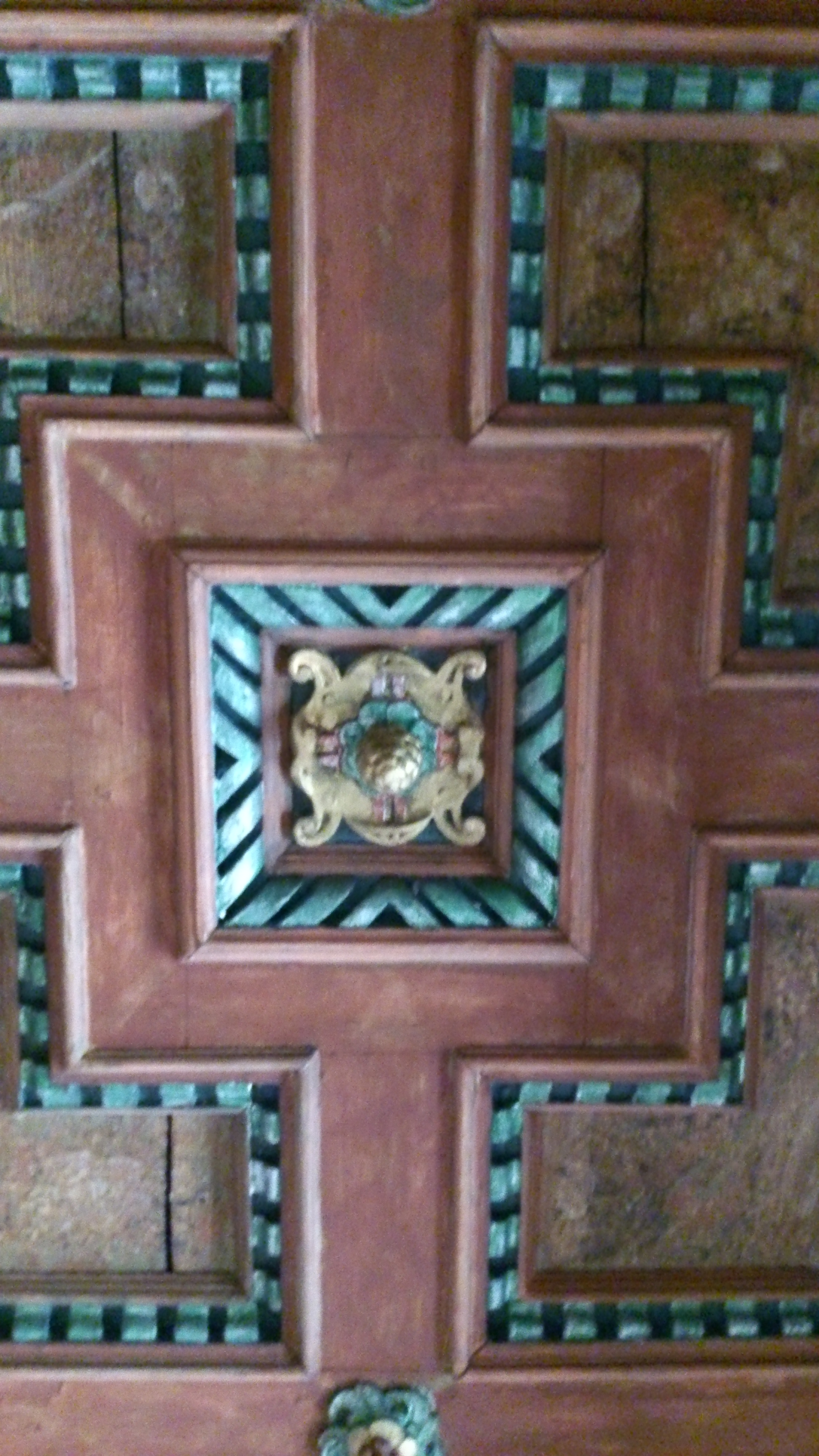
Ceiling in Aalborgstuen 1602

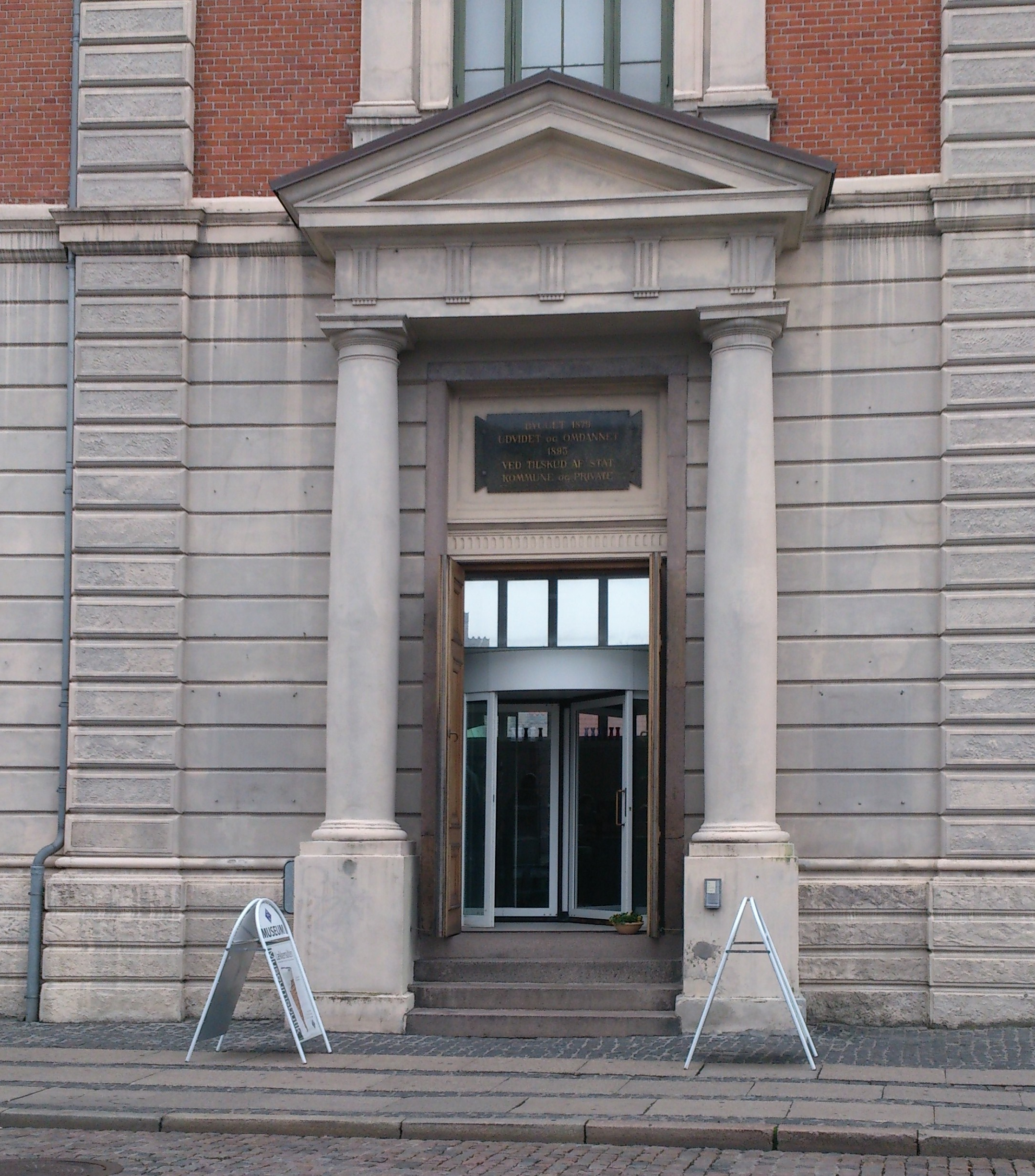
Aalborg Historical Museum entrance
