= Jørgen Olufsen =

Danish politician

Jørgen Olufsen was a Danish politician. Olufsen built Jørgen Olufsen's House, Denmark's best preserved merchant's mansion in the Renaissance style. The son of the Horsens merchant, Hans Felthuus, and his wife, Sidsel Jørgensdatter, he was named after his grandfather, Jørgen Olufsen, who was mayor of Horsens. He moved to Aalborg where he married Maren Pops, the daughter of Mayor Povl Pops. Olufsen younger half-brother, the merchant Jens Bang, built his own mansion, Jens Bang's House.

Olufsen served as town councillor in 1598 and became mayor of Aalborg in 1618. Olufsen's term as mayor was set with difficulties. In 1624, he was confronted with a peasants' revolt as a result of hard times and the risk of starvation. When the leader of the revolt escaped from prison, Olufsen was dismissed by order of the king in 1625. In 1627, during the Thirty Years War, German troops occupied Aalborg, inciting Olufsen to flee to Norway with his family until he could return two years later.
