= The Historical Museum of Northern Jutland =

Coordinates: 57°2′53.30″N 9°55′4″E

The Historical Museum of Northern Jutland (HMNJ) (Danish: Nordjyllands Historiske Museum) is the product of the fusion of Aalborg Historical Museum, The Museum Society for Hals, The Museum Society of Hadsund, The South Himmerland Museum, and others, in 2004. The museum system in this umbrella organization is administered by a 12-member committee, with members from the participating organizations. The administrative headquarters is in Algade 48, Aalborg.

The Historical Museum of Northern Jutland works with research, collection, documentation, conservation, and promotion of local and cultural history in Aalborg, Mariagerfjord, Rebild, and Jammerbugt Municipality.

The museum's mission is: "Attentive history". According to their website, a more elaborate description reads:

"With a firm professional anchor and an unassuming appeal, The Historical Museum of Northern Jutland should in its approach create and maintain the foundation for the understanding of history. Within a horizon of 5 to 10 years, the museum should be among the 5 best museums in Denmark, gauged by the five pillars of all museums: collecting, conservation, registering, research and educational outreach."

HMNJ is also responsible for care of many of the pre-historic sites like barrows and dolmens, within the associated municipalities.

== Exhibitions ==
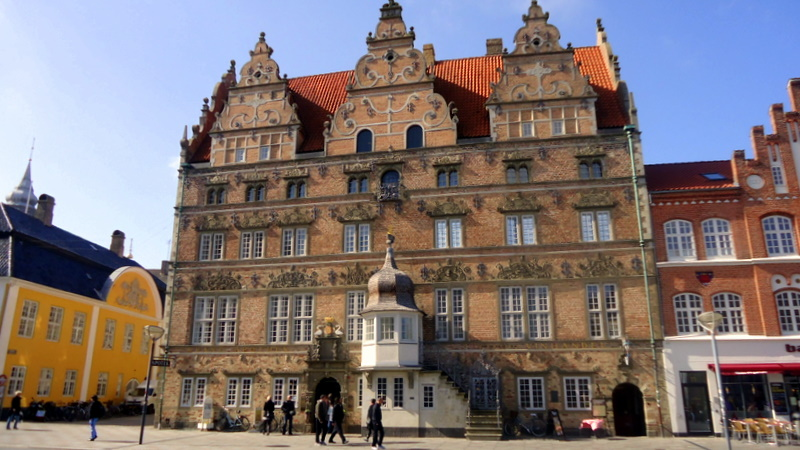
'Apotekersamlingen' is situated in the attic of the 350-year-old apothecary, known as 'Jens Bang's Stenhus' in Aalborg.

The organization administers these thirteen exhibitions in the region:

- Aalborg Historical Museum
- Gråbrødrekloster Museum
- Apotekersamlingen
- Lindholm Høje Museet
- Cirkusmuseet
- Boldrup Museum
- Hadsund Egnssamling
- Hals Museum
- Havnø Mølle (Møllehistorisk samling)
- Hobro Museum
- Lystfartøjsmuseet
- Mariager Museum
- Vikingecenter Fyrkat

== Gallery ==
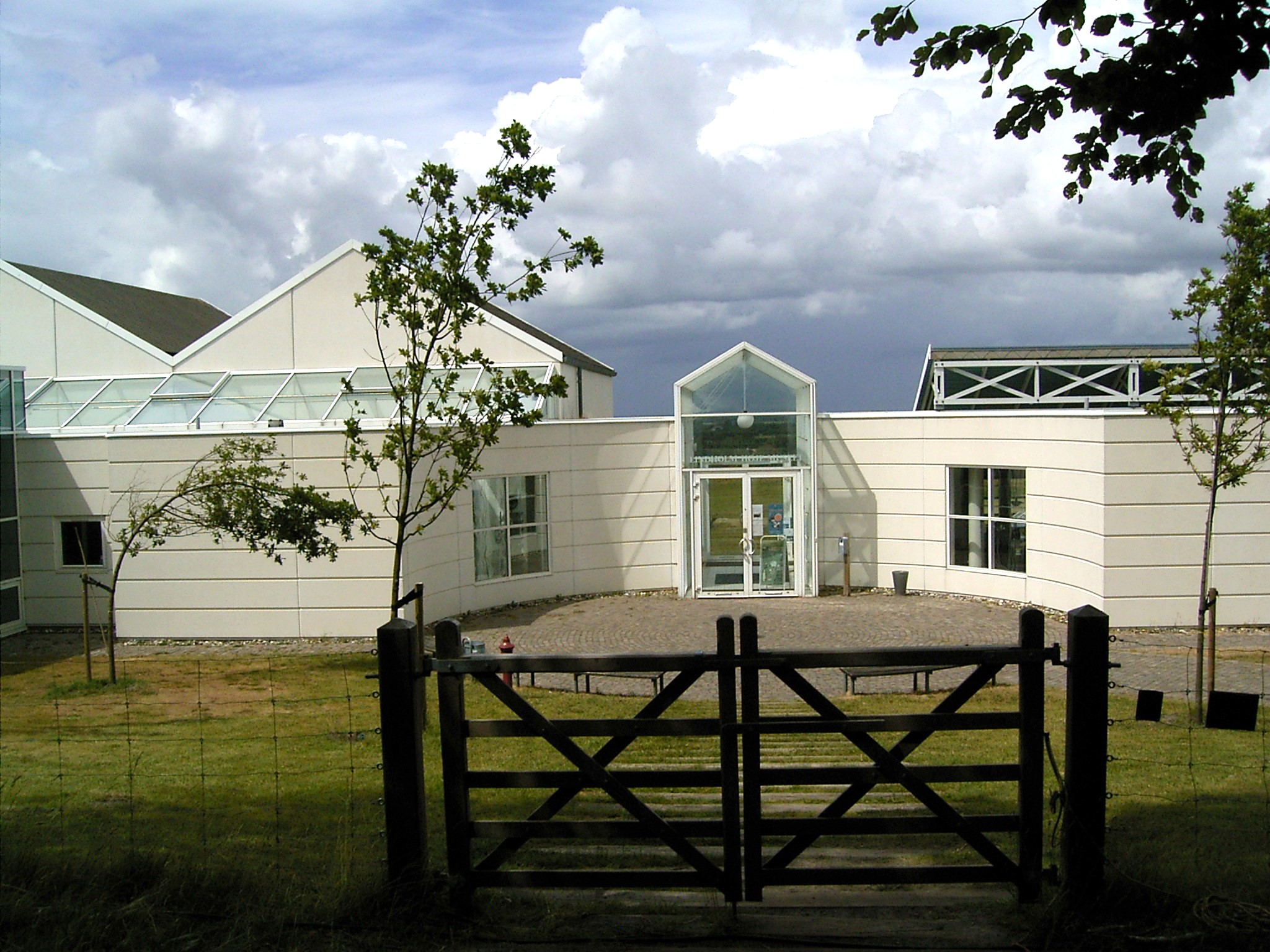
Lindholm Høje Museet.

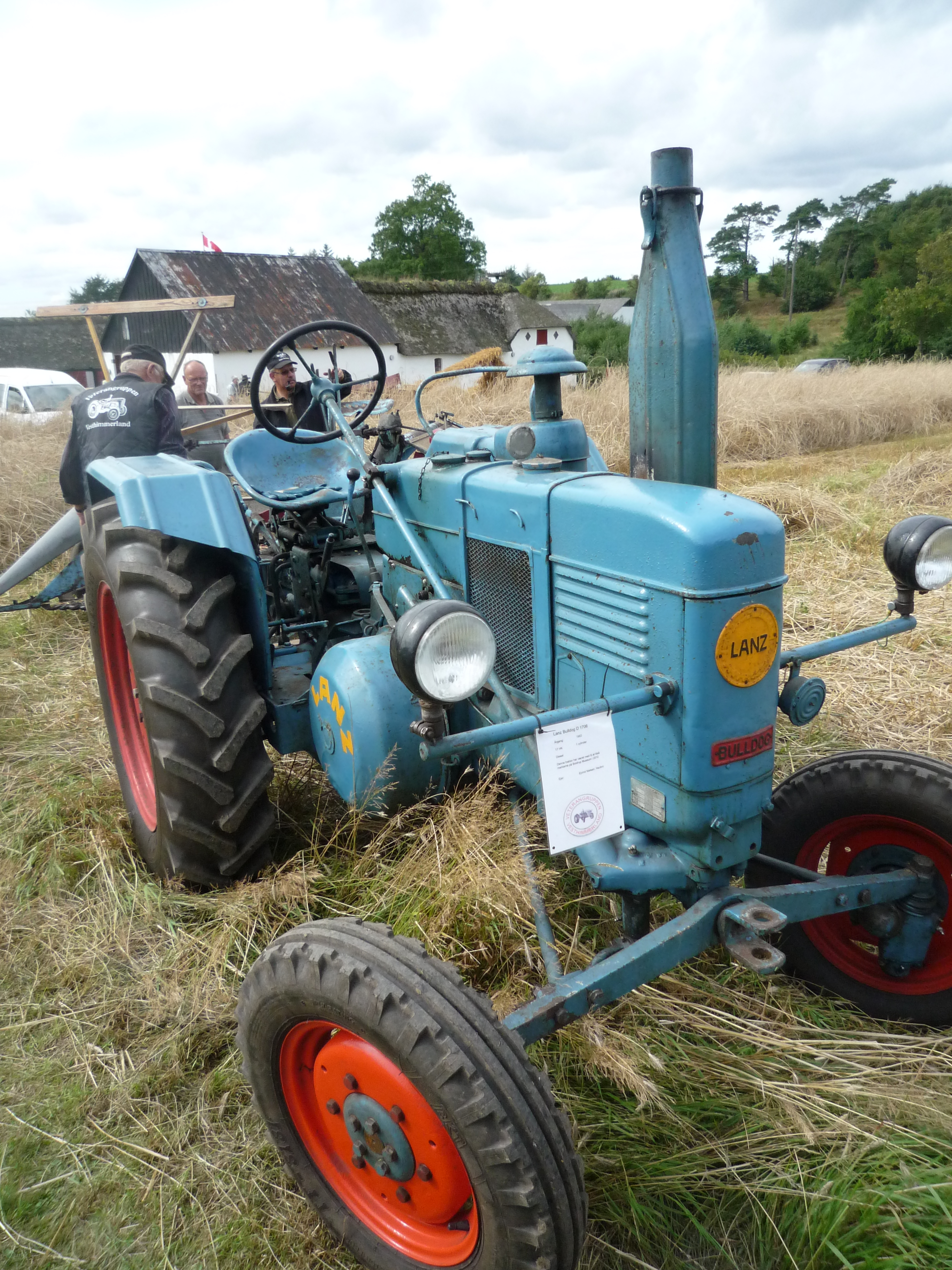
Old tractor from Boldrup Museum.

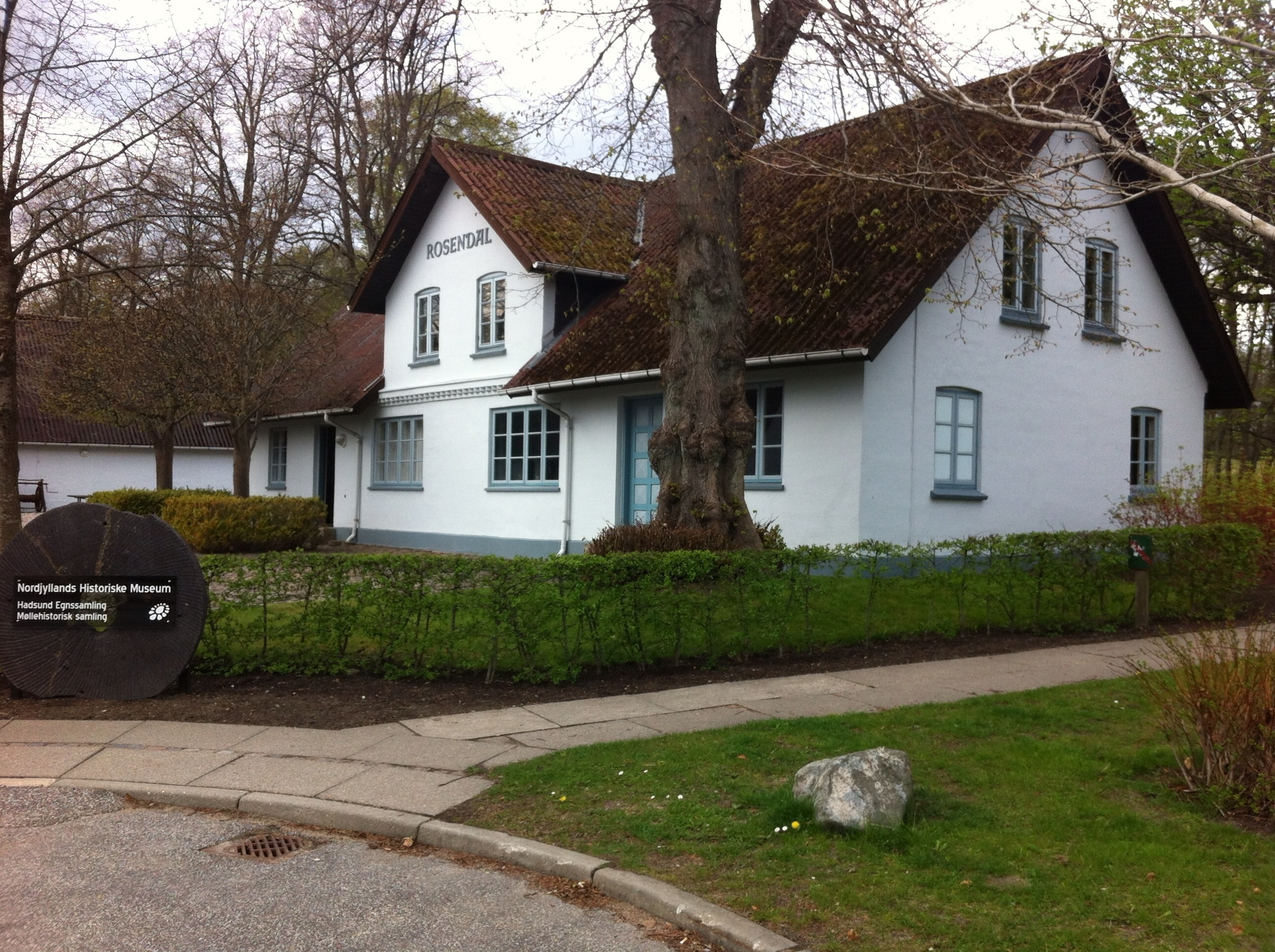
Hadsund Egnssamling in Hadsund.

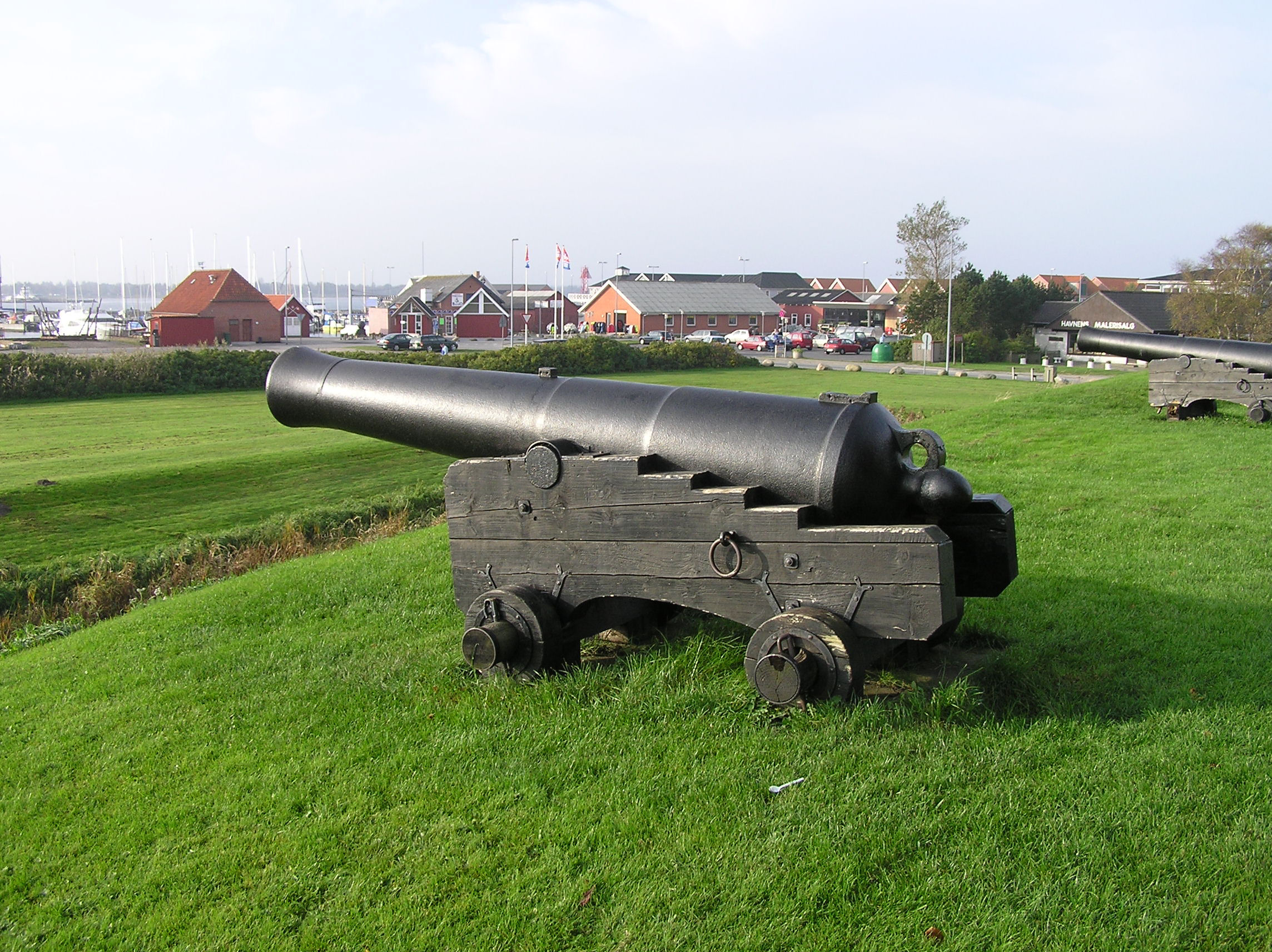
One of the old canons on the entrenchments at Hals Museum.

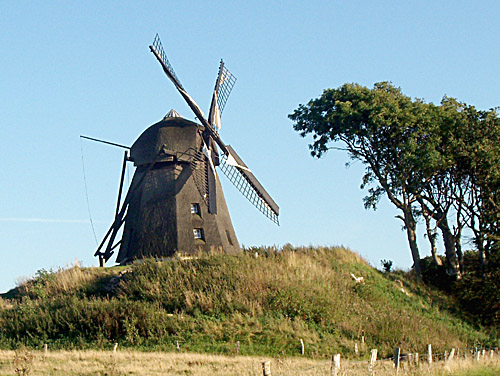
Havnø Mølle. A windmill part of the mill collection of 'Møllehistorisk samling'.

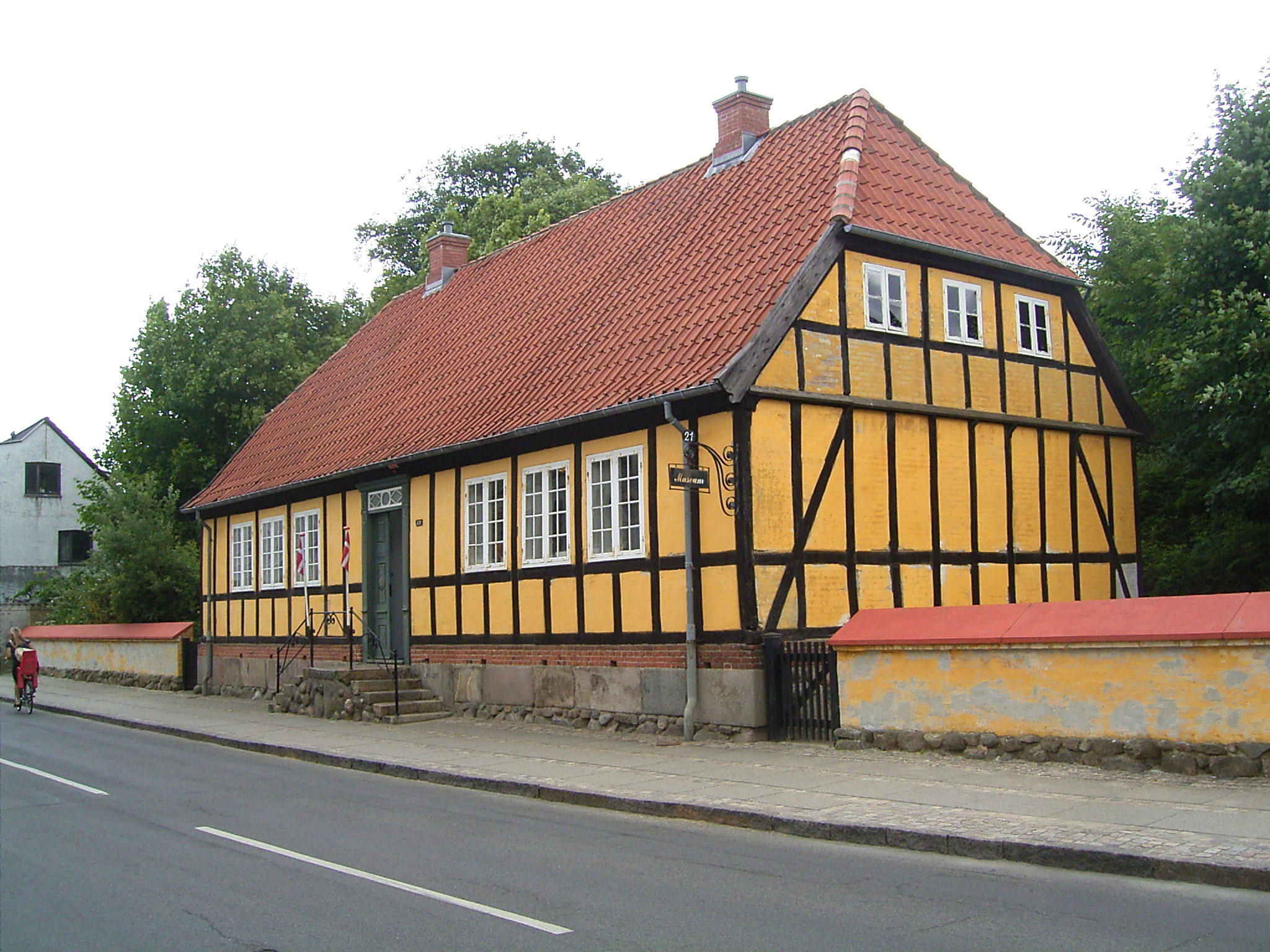
Hobro Museum.

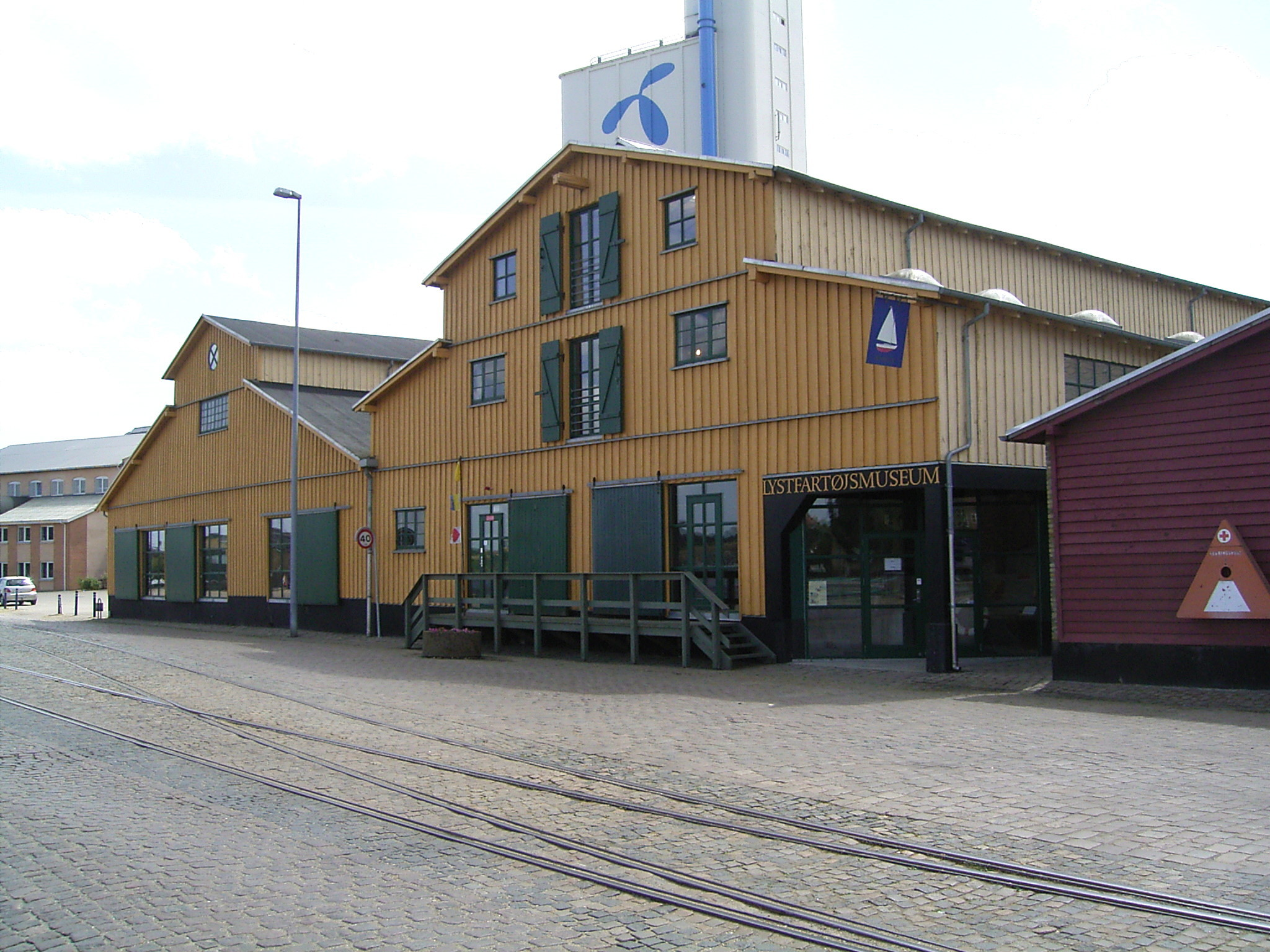
Lystfartøjsmuseet.

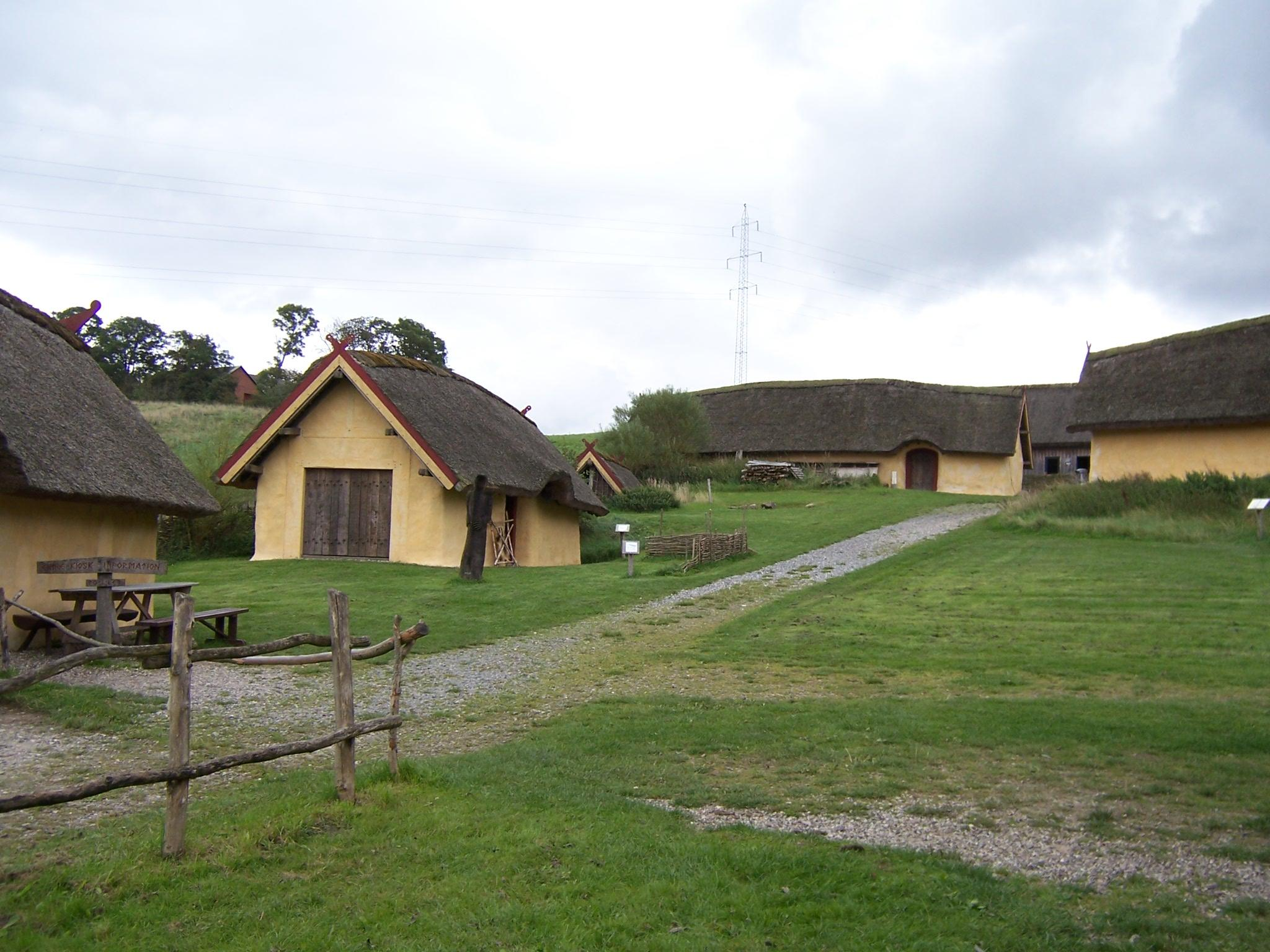
Entry-road to 'Vikingecenter Fyrkat'.

== See also ==
- Fyrkat
- Jens Bang's House
- Lindholm Høje
- Museums in Aalborg
