= Defence and Garrison Museum =

- Aalborg Forsvars- og Garnisonsmuseum

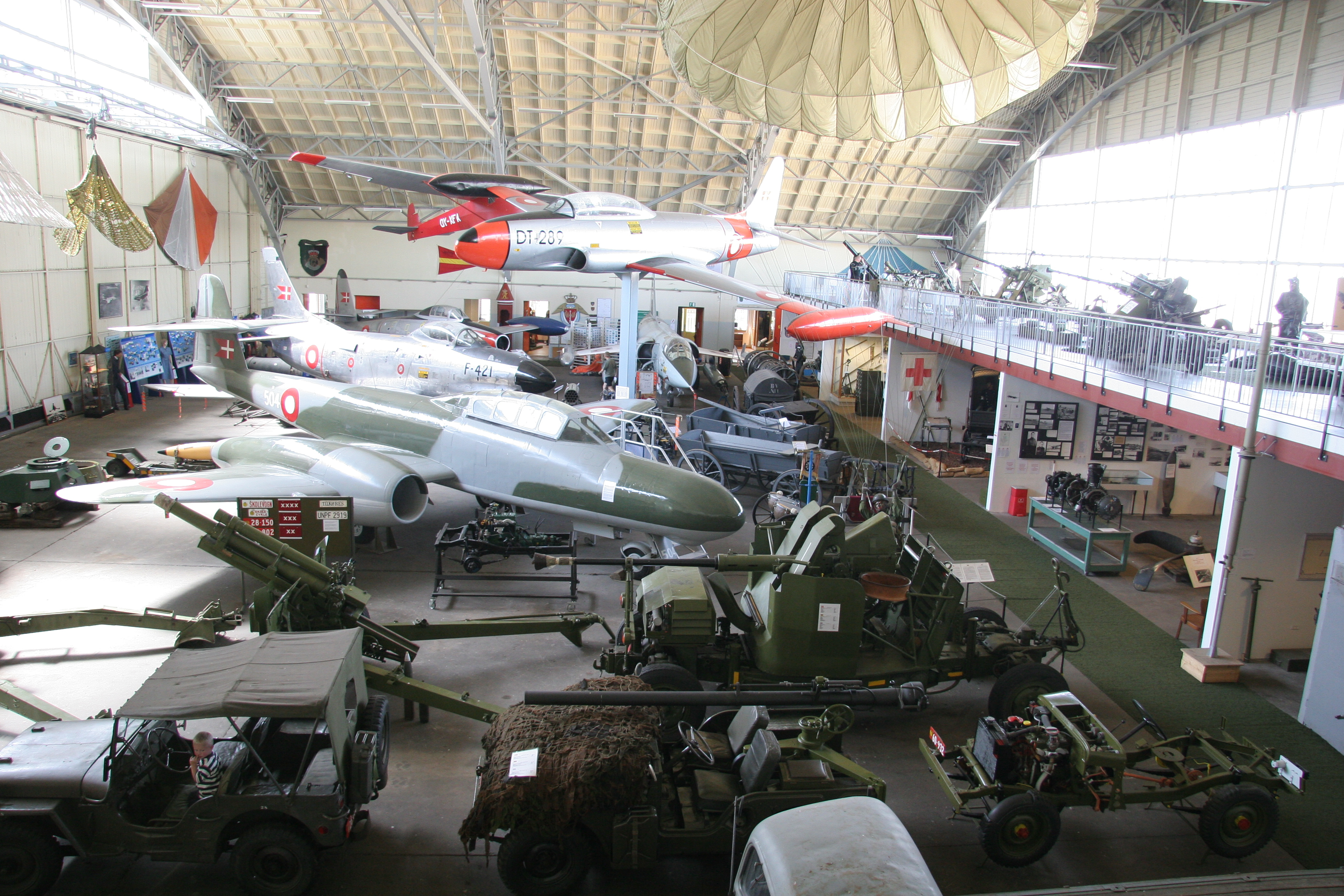
- Part of the exhibition in the hangar at Aalborg Defence- and Garrison Museum
- Established: 22 June 2002
- Location: Aalborg, Denmark
- Coordinates: 57°3′22″N 9°52′58″E
- Visitors: 18,500 (2012)
- Director: Flemming Larsen
- Website: forsvarsmuseum.dk

The Aalborg Defence and Garrison Museum (Danish: Aalborg Forsvars- og Garnisonsmuseum) is a military museum in Aalborg, Denmark that covers all branches (except naval) of Danish defence organizations.

== History ==
The museum is located in a seaplane hangar, built by German occupation forces during World War II. The German seaplane base Seefliegerhorst Aalborg was established there in 1940. Following the war, the hangar was used as a storage depot for equipment of the Danish Civil Defence Forces. In August 2001, the hangar was provided to the Garrison Historical Society of Aalborg for the creation of a military museum. The building was renovated and the museum opened on 22 June 2002. In 2009 a second exhibition hall was opened creating a total exhibit area of approximately 15,000 square metres (160,000 sq ft).

== Exhibits ==
The museum covers most branches of Danish defence organizations—the Danish Navy was excluded because it was already represented in the city's maritime museum. The branches include the Royal Danish Army, the Royal Danish Air Force, the Home Guard, the Police, and the Danish Emergency Management Agency with an emphasis on their activities during and after World War II to the present. There are also exhibitions of Denmark during World War II 1940–45, and about Aalborg as a garrison city since 1779.

In the original command bunker of the seaplane base are exhibitions on the three German airbases in Aalborg during WW II and the camps for German refugees after the end of the war.

== Funding ==
The museum is a private institution that does not receive government grants for the operation. The museum is almost exclusively run by volunteers, who have served in the Danish armed forces. Defence authorities provided most of the museum's exhibits, especially the heavy equipment such as vehicles and fighter jets, thus the museum contains a large portion of stockpiled equipment during the Cold War.

The museum is open daily from 1 April to 31 October. Because the hangar is unheated, the museum is open only by special arrangement from 1 November to 1 April. However the museum is open in week 7 and 8 (Danish winter vacation period. The museum had more than 18,500 visitors in 2012.
