= Jørgen Olufsen's House =

Coordinates: 57.049319°N 9.921844°E

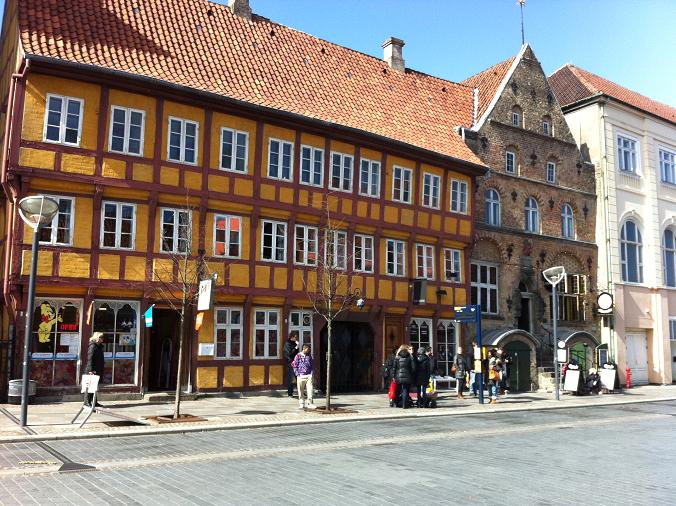
Façade of Jørgen Olufsen's house

Jørgen Olufsen's House (Danish: Jørgen Olufsen's Gård) is located in Aalborg, Denmark. Built in 1616 on the Østerå, a wide-mouth stream which became the city's harbour. Its current address is Østerågade 25. The three-storey house is Denmark's best preserved merchant's mansion in the Renaissance style. Built mainly of sandstone, it also has a half-timbered section. Olufsen, the older half-brother of Jens Bang who built the equally notable Jens Bang's House, was a successful merchant as well as Aalborg's mayor. The residence features an integrated warehouse.

== Background ==
Aalborg grew up around two wide-mouthed streams, Østerå and Versterå (East Stream and West Stream), which flowed into the Limfjord, providing access to shipping. They contributed to the city's prosperity in the late 16th and early 17th centuries as a result of increased trade with countries with Scandinavia, Russia and England as well as with the Hanseatic ports. The streams (which today have been drained off) were originally flanked by residences of successful merchants on one side and by warehouses on the other. Østerå continued to serve as a harbour for light ships until the second half of the 19th century. The last of the houses on Østerå was built by Jørgen Olufsen who had been a town councillor since 1598 and became mayor of Aalborg in 1618.

== Architecture ==
Olufsen built a large two-storey, gabled house at the northern end of Østerå with a large cellar. The gabled section was built of stone but remaining bays of the eight-bay building were half-timbered. The gable was essentially in the Renaissance style but had several Gothic features including its original stepping. It can also be seen that the two large ground floor window are slightly displaced southwards, probably in order to provide sufficient space for the large room on the north side of the entrance. While the windows in the stone-built gable section are topped with protruding round-arches, the arch above the large north window is almost flat. The façade is decorated with wrought-iron anchors but the most notable feature is the doorway at the top of a flight of steps between the two entrances to the cellar. The round-arched doorway, flanked by sculpted figures and topped by the head of a bearded man with the completion of 1616 in a Renaissance cartouche. There was probably also an inscription with the initials of the first owner but this can no longer be seen. A little higher up there is a wooden figure of a woman in Renaissance dress with an apple or flower in her hand. It has been suggested that the woman represents Flora, the goddess of flowers. The Olufsens' living quarters were on the lower floor with its large windows and high ceilings. The upper storey and loft were used for storage, thanks to their dry, airy conditions.

== Later developments ==
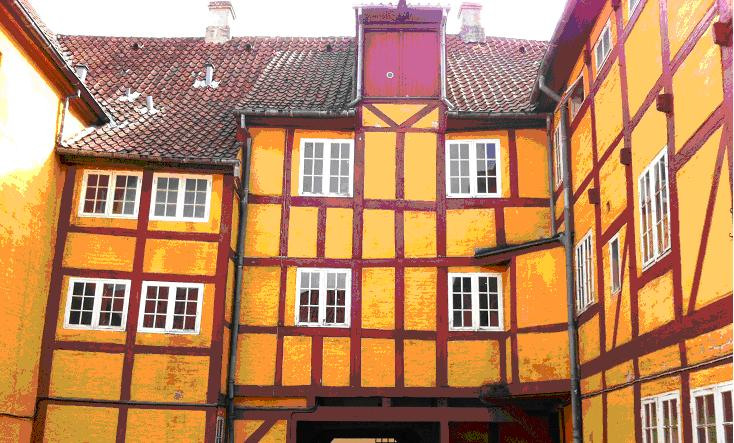
Rear of the half-timbered building

Olufsen experienced problems with his neighbours whose new houses and additions began to restrict his view of the harbor but he was successful in his ensuing legal action. Hamborggård, the long half-timbered residence to the south of Olufsen's stone house, was erected more or less at the same time as Olufsen's mansion. It was possibly built by Olufsen himself or his son-in-law, Christopher de Hemmer, who was mayor of Aalborg from 1630 to 1658 and inherited the entire property on Olufsen's death in 1645. At the beginning of the 19th century, the owner was Ludvig Stoustrup, a grocer. His son, Axel Stoustrup (born 1908), tells us that during his childhood there were five horses there and that during the First World War his family had a cow and hens. Niels Søndergaard, a licensed merchant, was also one of the property's owners. His and his wife's initials can be seen above the main doorway.

For many years, the property was known as Ellen Marsvinsgaard but Ellen Marsvin, Christian IV's mother-in-law never had any connections with it. She did however own another house in Aalborg just north of Budolfi Church. Now a listed building, Jørgen Olufsen's House is a major tourist attraction. It was comprehensively renovated in 1938. Today the once stately apartments serve as a wine bar, restaurant and school for creative writing.
