= Jens Bang =

Danish merchant (1575–1644)

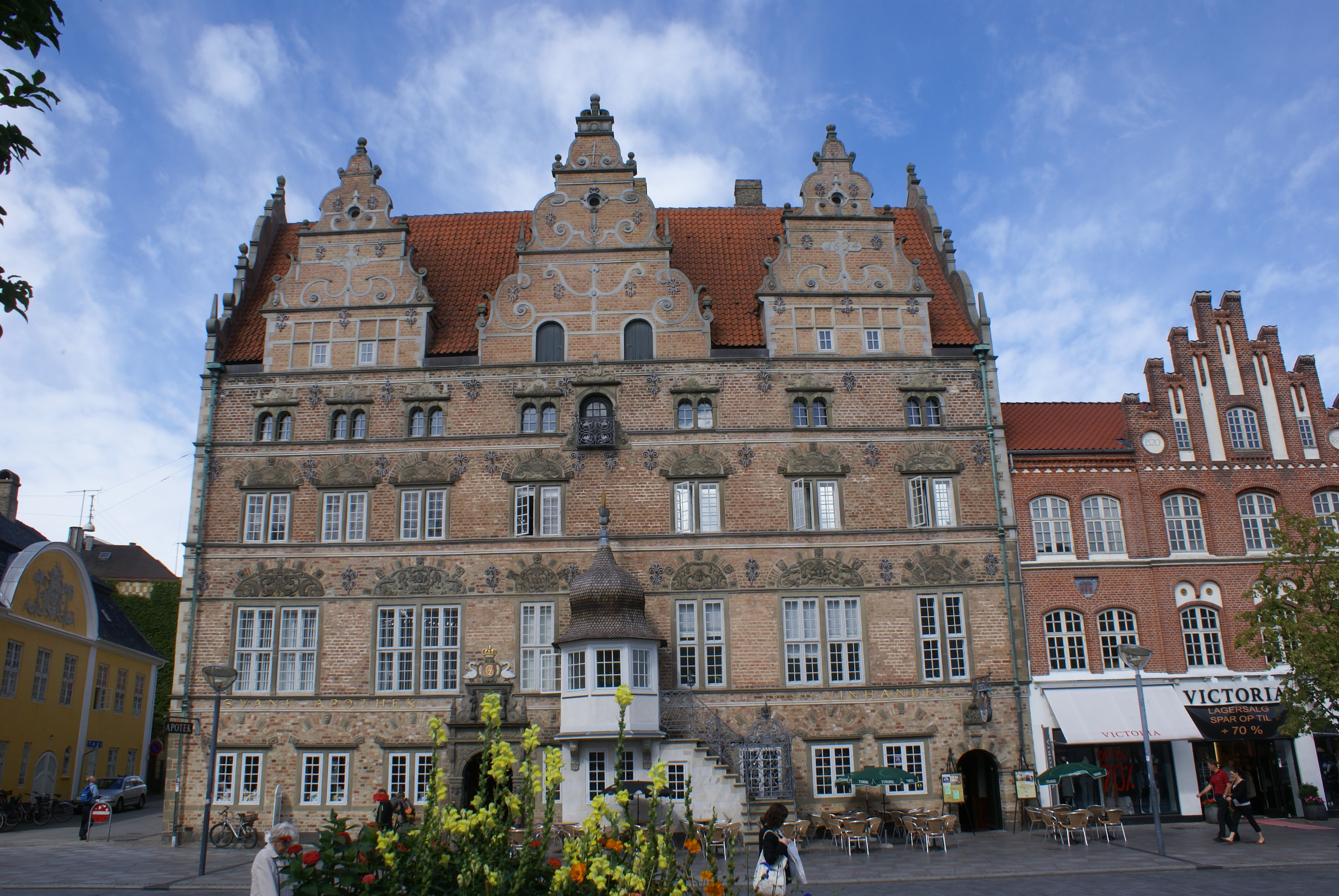
Jens Bang's house in Aalborg

Jens Bang (c. 1575 - 20 February 1644) was a wealthy Danish merchant.

== Biography ==
Born in Horsens, he was the son of merchant Oluf Bang. His older half-brother was the mayor, Jørgen Olufsen. Bang arrived in Aalborg at the age of 22 where he was apprenticed to a merchant. He purchased a large plot of land in 1621 on the corner of Algade and Østerå where, in 1623-24, he built a large stone house, which came to be known as Jens Bang's House. He may have been trying to out-do his older brother, Olufsen, who had built a large stone house in 1616 at 25 Østerå, which came to be known as Jørgen Olufsen's House. He married Mette, daughter of Knud Jensen, the eel-salter. Bang died in Aalborg in 1644.

== See also ==
- List of people on stamps of Denmark
