= Jens Bang's House =

Landmark in Aalborg, Denmark

Coordinates: 57.048472°N 9.921083°E

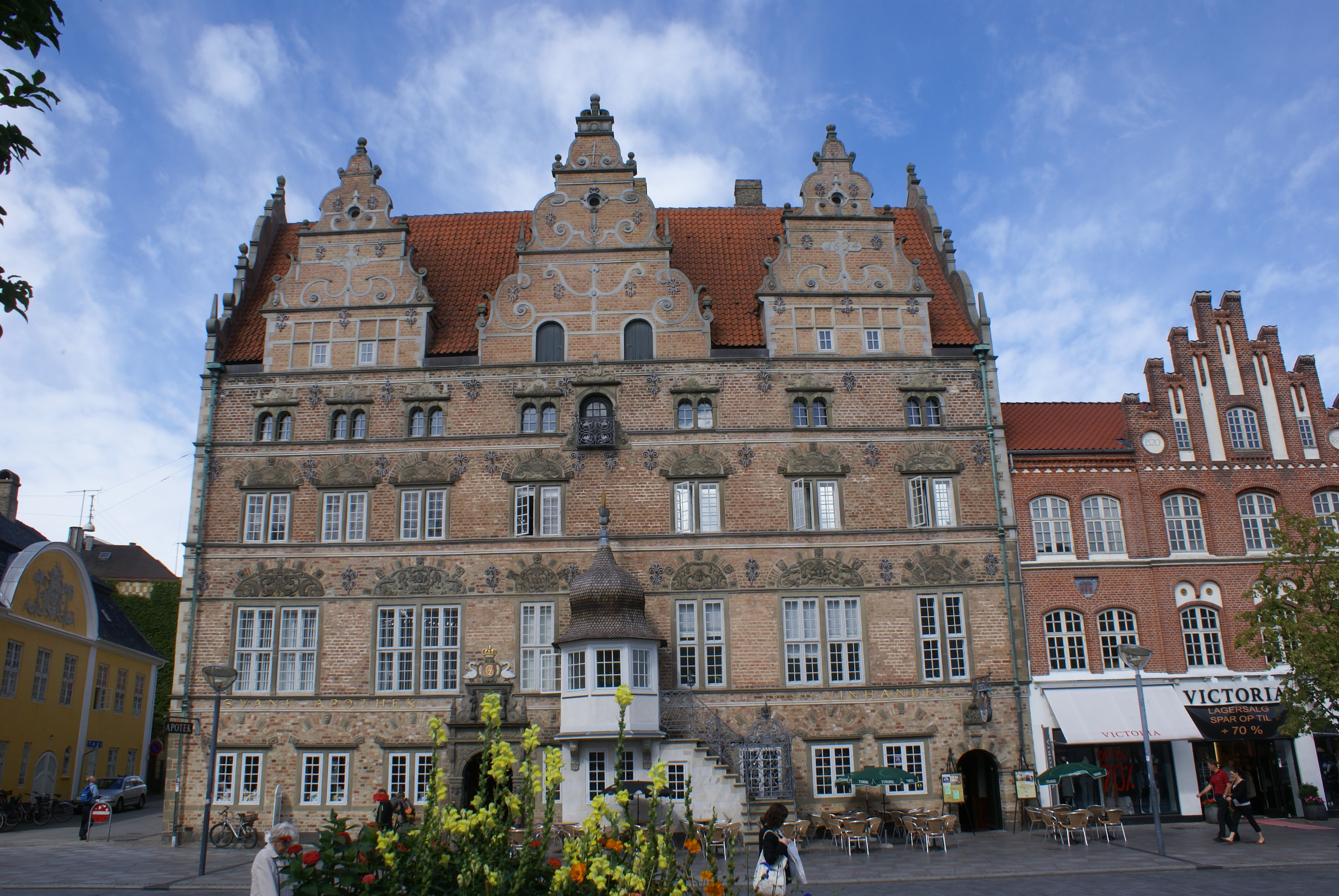
Exterior view of Jens Bang's House

Jens Bang's House (Danish: Jens Bangs Stenhus; translated, "Jens Bang's Stone House") is a landmark in Aalborg, Denmark. Situated on Østerågade in Nytorv square, it was built in 1624 by Jens Bang in Dutch Renaissance style. Noted for its gables and sculpted auricular window décor, it is said to be the finest privately owned Renaissance building in the country. It also features gargoyles and a sculpture of Bang's face, tongue sticking out. The five-storey building has housed the city's oldest pharmacy for more than 300 years. It is privately owned.

== Background ==
Jens Bang, remembered as one of Denmark's richest citizens, was born in Horsens. The son of Sidsel Jørgensdatter by her second marriage to Oluf Bang, he was consequently the half-brother of Aalborg's mayor, Jørgen Olufsen, who had already built a mansion higher up the Østerå street. After arriving in Aalborg in 1600, Bang joined the city's merchant-trade guild Guds Legems Lav. Five years later, he obtained the status of a licensed merchant. Over the next 20 years, he was so fortunate and successful in his business, that he became one of the country's leading traders and certainly the most prosperous merchant in Aalborg. Surprisingly, Bang never assumed any responsibilities in the city's administration, possibly because he was not keen to do so but more probably aggressive attitude prevented him from doing so. He was an unparalleled facilitator, disliked by his contemporaries to the point of being involved in physical fights. On the more positive side, in 1637, together with his wife, he founded an establishment with accommodation for 26 paupers. In 1623, Bang inherited Københavns gård, a large old Aalborg property, on the corner of Østerå and Adelsgade. After demolishing most of the old buildings, he built an enormous residence, completing it the following year.

== Architecture ==
The house is said to be Denmark's finest independently owned Renaissance mansion, comparable only to Mattias Hansen's House on Amagertorv in Copenhagen. The latter has only three floors and two gables while Jens Bang's House has four main floors and three gables, also containing floorspace and rooms. The house is decorated with sculptured stonework of the same high quality as Christian IV's own buildings. No doubt as a result of Bang's excellent relationship with the king, he was able to call upon the finest designers and craftsmen of the times, possibly employing Hans van Steenwinckel the Younger as his architect. Jørgen Olufsen's House on the same street hardly bears comparison.

The house originally had five round-arched doorways, probably topped by some of the sculpted figures and gargoyles which now crown the windows. The ground floor was used for trading booths and warehousing. In addition to the residential rooms on the first floor, there were also warehouses in the building. Bang's own rooms on the first floor were lit by a row of enormous windows with sandstone frames, some single, some double without any regularity. Their round-arches are decorated with angels and gargoyles in the auricular Baroque style.

The protruding bay at the centre of the façade was certainly once the main entrance, located on the first floor with a flight of steps leading up from the street. With its intricately sculpted figures and decorations, the portal is a true masterpiece. It clearly displays the year 1623 but the plaque at the top, where the original owner once had his name, now bears the mirrored monograms of the pharmacist C.L. Rübner and his wife. The crest with the Christian VI's monogram, flanked by swans, must once have displayed that of Christian IV. On the third floor, which also contained living accommodation, the windows are smaller and more simply decorated. The fourth floor has double, round-arched window frames, topped by a cornice with ornamental strips and spires. In the centre, there is a large hatch, probably added later. Together with the loft, the floor was previously used as a warehouse. The three tall pointed gables are decorated with the finest Baroque ornaments of the period, reflecting the very best examples of Dutch design.

== Additions and alterations ==
The half-timbered bay with its fine shingle spire and its figure of Fortuna dates from around 1700. There were a number of other alterations around 1712: in addition to modifications to the main entrance and adjacent windows, finely plastered Baroque ceilings were added to two of the first-floor rooms, probably at the initiative of Johannes-Friedenreich. For a time, the top of the south gable was replaced by a hip roof but was reconstructed in 1916 during comprehensive restoration work under Harald Lønborg-Jensen. A stairway tower was built at the back of the house in 1897 to replace an inside spiral staircase. Among the property's additional buildings on Adelgade and Cortesgyde, one of the rooms in the south wing has a Late Gothic vaulted ceiling which has survived from Københavns gård.

== Ownership ==
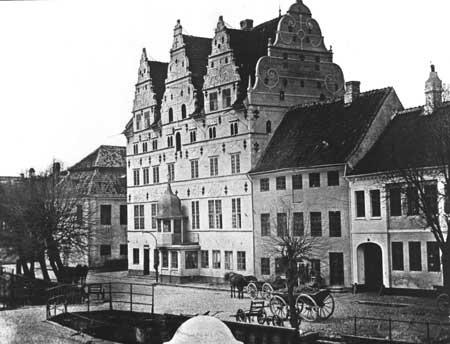
An 1890 street view of front facade and neighboring buildings.

During the Thirty Years' War, the house was occupied by the Germans from 1627 to 1629 while Jens Bang fled to Marstrand awaiting their departure. Bang died in 1644 during the Torstenson War when Aalborg was once again occupied. This time the troops left his house in a sorry state. As Bang had no direct descendants, ownership of the house was divided between a number of inheritors until in 1671, the pharmacist Johannes Friederich bought the buildings and opened his Swaneapotek (Swan Pharmacy) there. The pharmacy has existed ever since and the building has been handed down from generation to generation, the Strøybergs inheriting it in 1829.

The building is owned by the fund "Apoteker S.C. Strøybergs Fond til Bevarelse af Jens Bangs Stenhus".

== Apotekersamlingen ==
The Svaneapotek (Swan Pharmacy) collection is now housed in one of the upper rooms, as a small pharmacy museum known as Apotekersamlingen. In premises open to visitors, the shelves display fine old receptacles and equipment including a container used to mix 70 ingredients to make theriaken which was said to have been effective in strengthening the weak. Jars of herbs and medicines as well as tools for the production of pills can be seen, providing evidence of the pharmacy's history over the past 300 years. Initially the pharmacy was also a grocery shop, licensed to sell spirits, wine, chocolate and licorice, which was also used for medicinal purposes.

Apotekersamlingen is administered by The Historical Museum of Northern Jutland, but owned by the same fund that owns the building.
