= The Museum Society of Hadsund =

Local history museum in Hadsund, Denmark

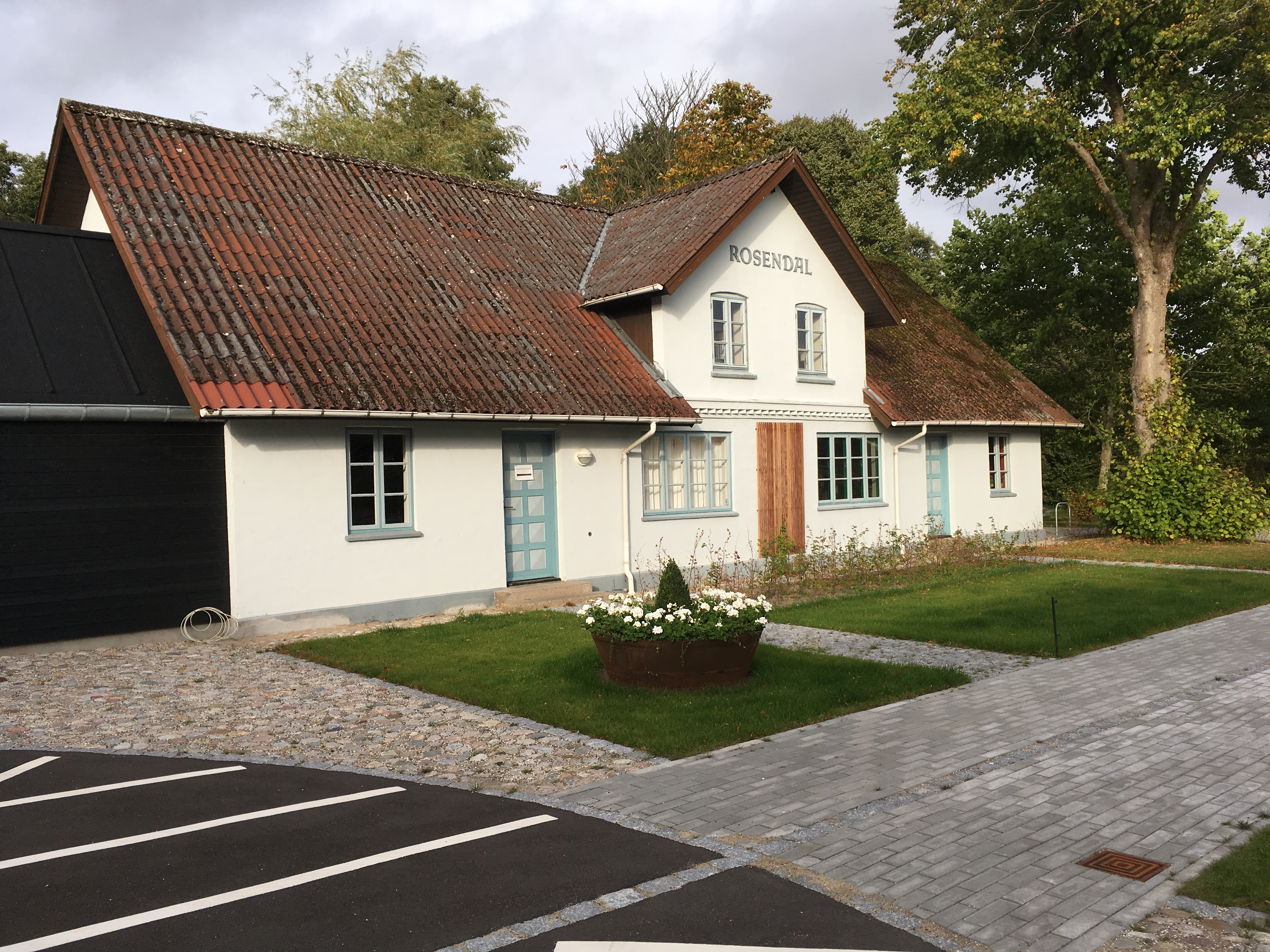
Hadsund Egnssamling

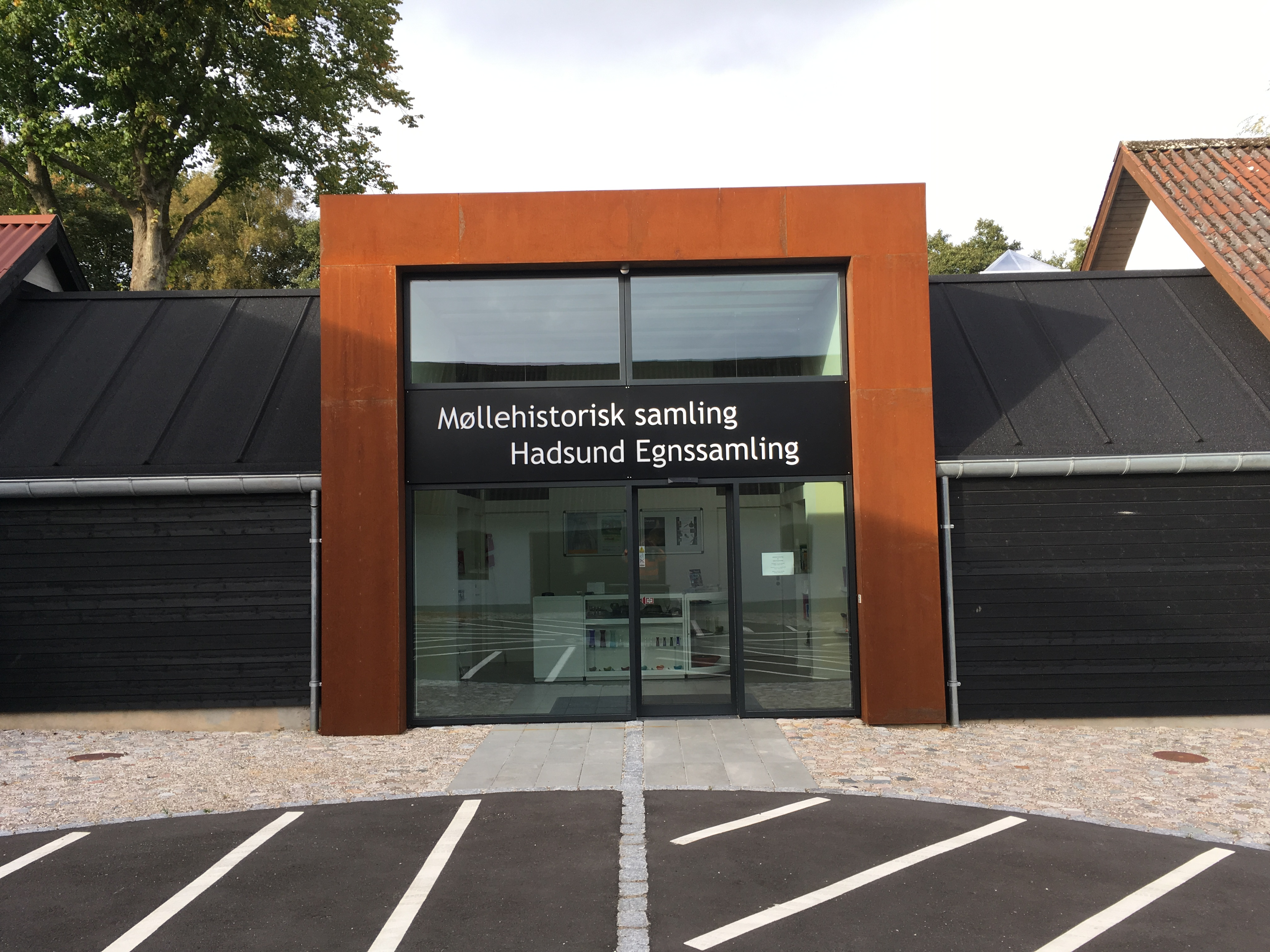
Hadsund Egnssamling entrance

The Museum Society of Hadsund (Danish: Hadsund Egnssamling) is a cultural history museum in Hadsund, Denmark.

During 1962, a museum association was established. The museum was inaugurated on October 2, 1962. During 1967, the exhibition moved from Sprøtehuset to Vestergade. On October 2, 1967, the new museum was inaugurated. Since 2004 it has been part of North Jutland Historical Museum.
