= Seefliegerhorst Aalborg =

Coordinates: 57°3′22″N 9°52′58″E

- Aalborg in Denmark
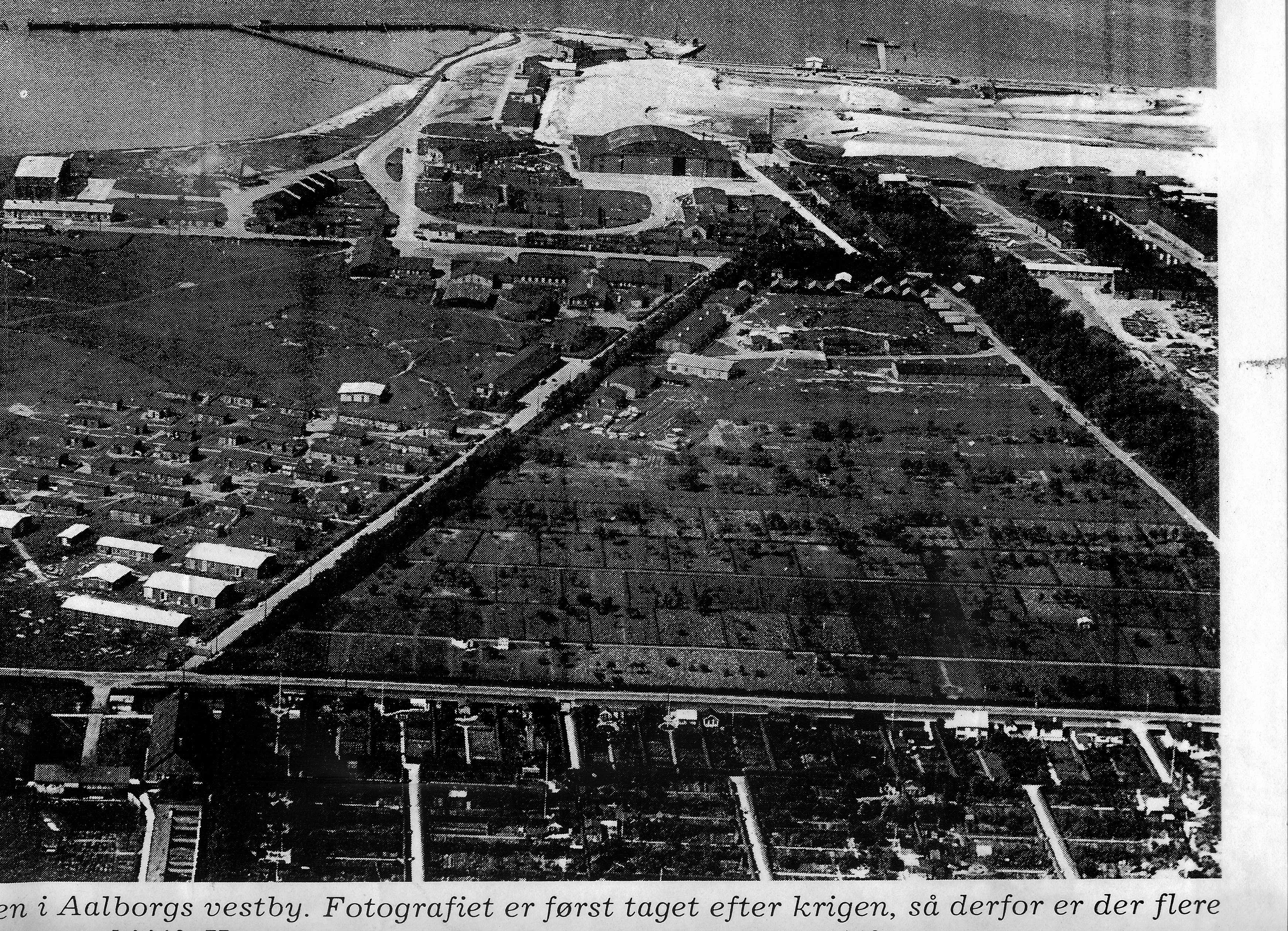
- Seaplane Base Aalborg right after end of WWII

Site information
- Operator: Luftwaffe
- Open to the public: yes

Site history
- Built: 1940
- In use: 1945
- Fate: Changed to Defence and Garrison Museum

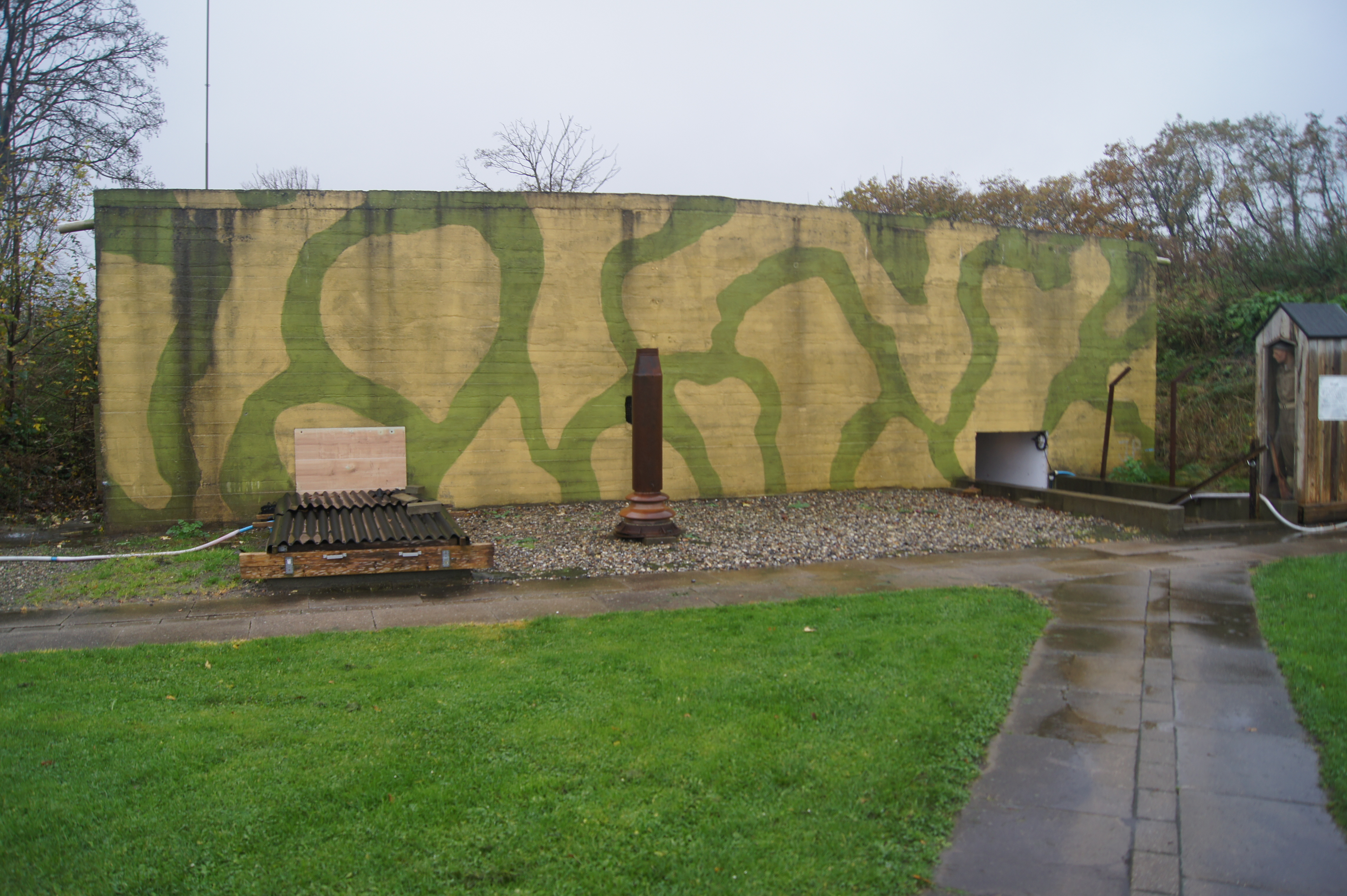
Command bunker

Seefliegerhorst Aalborg was a German seaplane base at Aalborg during the occupation of Denmark, 1940 to 1945.

On 12 April 1940, three days after the German occupation of Denmark, the first German seaplanes landed on the Limfjord on the western outskirts of Aalborg. The Germans immediately requisitioned a large area around Skydebanevej, and mid August the same year a seaplane base had been established, however without many of the fixed facilities needed at a fully operational base in wartime. Construction works continued throughout the war building bunkers, field fortifications, barbed wire fences and air defense sites.

Spread out over the large area were the many facilities that are part of a wartime air base: Quartering barracks, office buildings, infirmary, workshops and ammunition depots. One air defence battery was set up to protect the base, including three 20 mm AA machine cannon commandeered by the Germans from the Danish army in April 1940 after the first British air raids against one of the other two German air bases in the Aalborg area the night between 20. and 21. of April 1940.

The hangar at the seaplane is a standard German Junkershalle. Build winter 1940–41.

Thus Seefliegerhorst Aalborg was a well equipped major air base for seaplanes with the task to secure the northern waters around Denmark and southern Norway against allied ships through sea reconnaissance and Anti-submarine warfare. On 5 May 1940 two Arado Ar 196A-3 seaplanes from Seefliegerhorst Aalborg managed to force the British minelayer submarine "Seal" to surrender in Kattegat. The submarine had successfully completed laying a 50-mine mine barrier west of the Swedish island Vinga, but was subsequently damaged by a German sea mine. The crew managed to surface the damaged submarine. The submarine was initially tugged to Frederikshavn and later to Kiel, where it was used to train German submariners and in the German propaganda. Furthermore, the seaplanes from Aalborg conducted minelaying operations in harbors in northern Britain and raids against convoys at Scotland. Concurrently with these operations the seaplanes were used in sea rescue operations in Danish waters. It all contributed to maintaining connection to the German forces in Norway.

In addition to the ordinary crew of 1500 persons at Seefliegerhorst Aalborg several training formations were stationed there for shorter or longer periods during the war. In 1943 a school for training seaplane pilots was established in Aalborg. On 27 May 1944 the so-called Bordkommando for the German battleship Tirpitz was established. That was a training unit for the air crews to be stationed on board the Tirpitz, and launched by catapult to conduct reconnaissance flights for the battleship. When the unit was committed to battle on board the Tirpitz the crews had only flown a few operational flights from Aalborg.

== Post war ==
From the beginning of 1945 German refugees started to pour into Denmark during the Evacuation of East Prussia, when the Soviet forces conquered that part of Germany. Refugee camps were established in many places in Denmark to house these refugees. At the end of the war a refugee camp was established in the facilities of Seefliegerhorst Aalborg, where additional barracks were erected. The hangar was used as a rendezvous for the refugees. The refugee camp was closed in 1947.

From 1950 until 2001 the hangar was used as a depot for the Danish Civil Defence forces. In 2001 a group of volunteers took over the hangar to establish the Aalborg Defence and Garrison Museum to be opened on 22 June 2002 as a private foundation.
