= Gråbrødrekloster Museum =

Archaeological museum in Aalborg, Denmark

Coordinates: 57.0472°N 9.9215°E

The Gråbrødrekloster Museum (English: Franciscan Monastery Museum) is an "in situ" museum in Algade, Aalborg, Denmark.

In 1250, a Franciscan monastery was founded here, but it does not exist anymore. The museum displays the archaeological artifacts excavated here at the site and sheds light on the history of Aalborg at the same time.

In Danish, the Franciscan Order is called Gråbrødrene (English:Grey-brethren), referring to the grey cloaks. In 2004, the museum joined the collective organization of The Historical Museum of Northern Jutland together with many other museums in Northern Jutland.
