= Lindholm Høje =

Iron-Age Viking graveyard in Denmark

Coordinates: 57°04′38″N 9°54′45″E

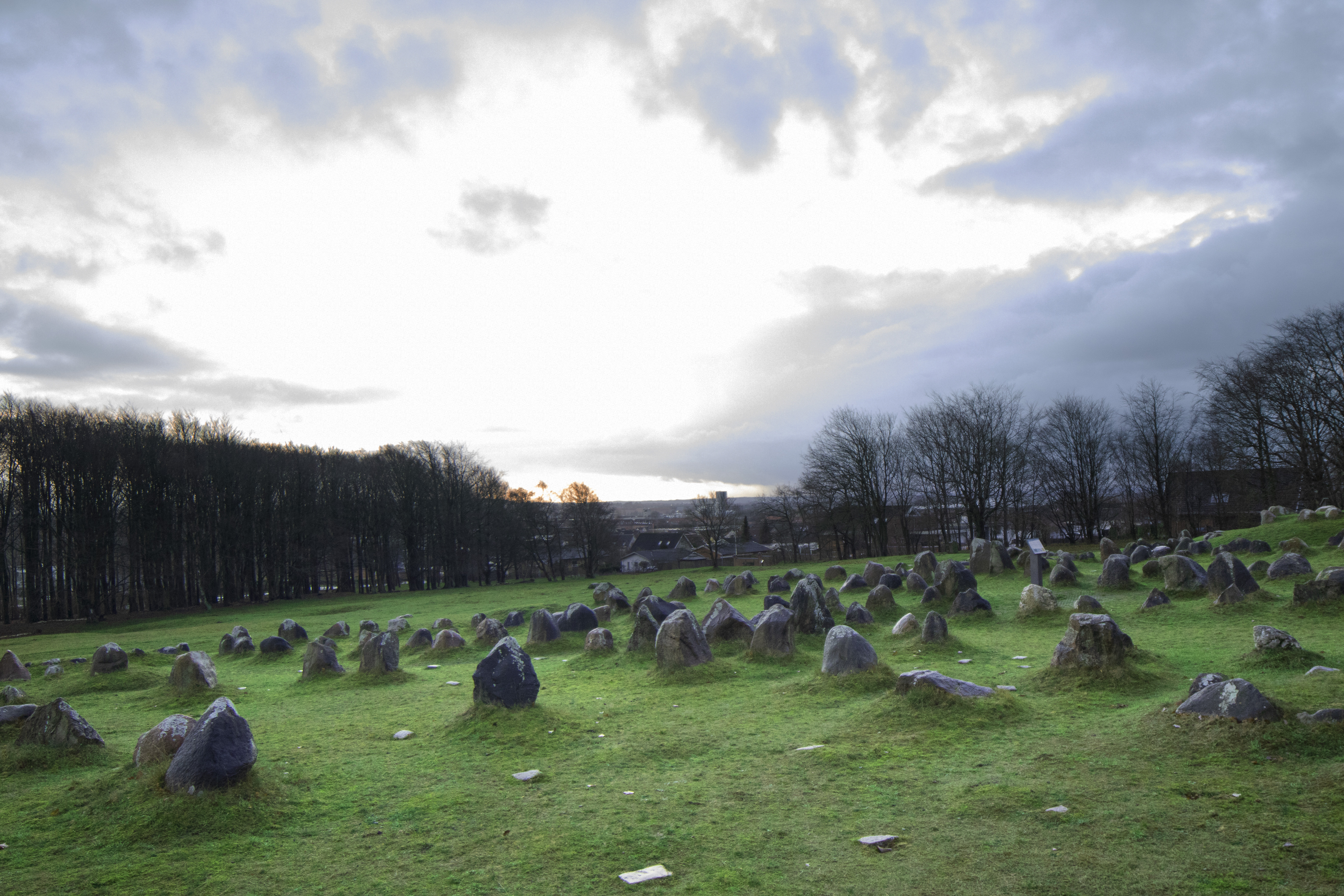
View from Lindholm Høje, December 2018. You can see both Nørresundby and Aalborg from here.

Lindholm Høje (Lindholm Hills, from Old Norse haugr, hill or mound) is a major Viking burial site and former settlement situated to the north of and overlooking the city of Aalborg in Denmark.

== About the area ==
The southern (lower) part of Lindholm Høje dates to 1000 – 1050 AD, the Viking Age, while the northern (higher) part is significantly earlier, dating back to the 5th century AD in the Nordic Iron Age. An unknown number of rocks have been removed from the site over the centuries, many, for example, being broken up in the 19th century for use in road constructions. The Viking Age part of the burial ground has suffered more from this than the older parts. The first major archaeological excavation, which ultimately included 589 of the approximately 700 graves, began in 1952, although excavations had been conducted as early as 1889.

Remains of villages has been found. The settlement is at an important crossing over the Limfjord, a stretch of water which divides the Jutland peninsula. During the Viking Age, it was only possible to make the crossing at this point or much further west along the fjord at Aggersund, because of the swamps which then edged the fjord on either side.

The settlement was abandoned in approximately 1200 AD, probably due to sand drifting from the western coast, which was a consequence of extensive deforestation and the exposed sand then being blown inland by the rough westerly winds. The sand which covered the site served to protect it in large part over the intervening centuries.

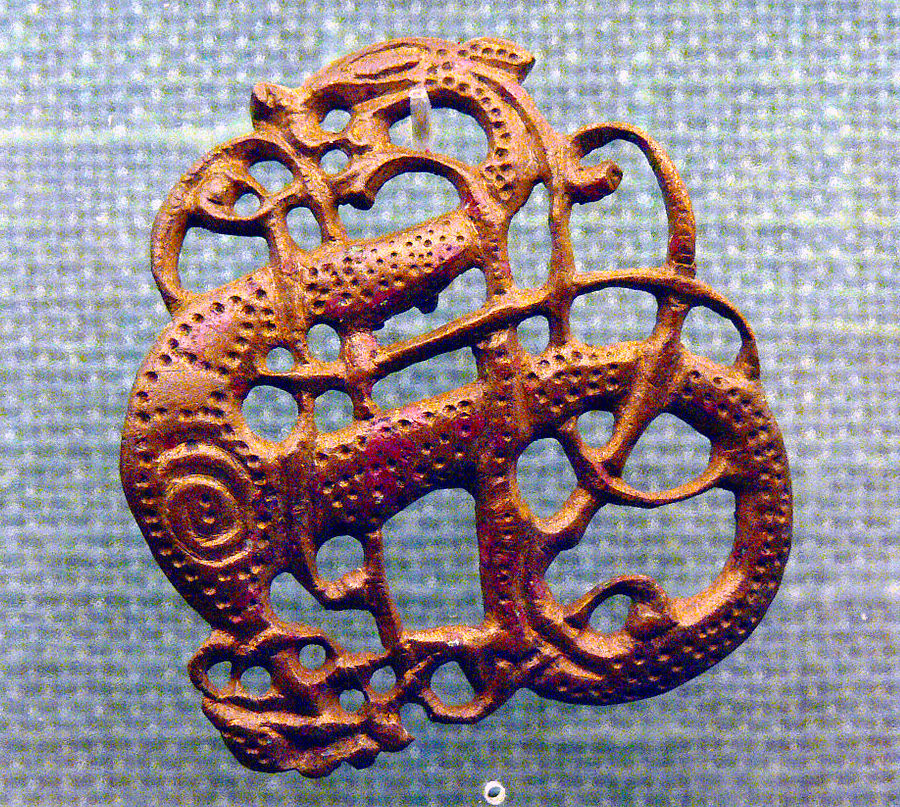
Urnes style brooch in bronze; a silver version was found at Lindholm Høje

Because of its location and transportation links, the settlement was obviously a significant centre for trade at the time, and this is borne out by glassware, gems and Arab coins found at the site. An 11th-century silver Urnes style brooch found in one grave is the model for bronze copies that were being cast in a Lund jeweler's workshop in the early 12th century.

The majority of the burials discovered were cremations, although a number of inhumations were also discovered, and it appeared that the tendency towards cremation or burial depended upon the period, cremation supplanting inhumation in the Viking Age. The pre-Viking Age burials were under mounds. Of the later graves, some women's graves appear to be distinguished by placement of rocks in a circle or oval, but most of the graves are marked with rocks either in a triangle or in the traditional shape of a boat (stone ship), indicating the importance that the Vikings placed upon water. The ship settings constitute the largest assemblage of well-preserved examples extant. The shape and size of the grave outline apparently indicate the status of the person – all of which is reminiscent of the ship burials of the Anglo-Saxons, Norwegian and Swedish Vikings and other ancient Germanic societies.

A museum adjacent to the site donated by Aalborg Portland A/S cement company to commemorate their centennial was opened in 1992. In 2008 the museum was enlarged, and a new exhibition of pre-history in the area of the Limfjord opened.

== Sources ==
- Lindholm Høje: Burial Ground and Village. Translated by Annette Lerche Trolle. Aalborg: Aalborg Historical Society, Aalborg Historical Museum, 1996. ISBN 87-87409-09-7
- Oscar Marseen. Lindholm Høje: Beskrivelse af udgravninger og fund. 5th ed. Aalborg: Aalborg Historiske Museum, 1992. OCLC 60959784 (Danish with English, German, and French summaries)
