= Aalborgtårnet =

Coordinates: 57°2′29″N 9°54′18″E

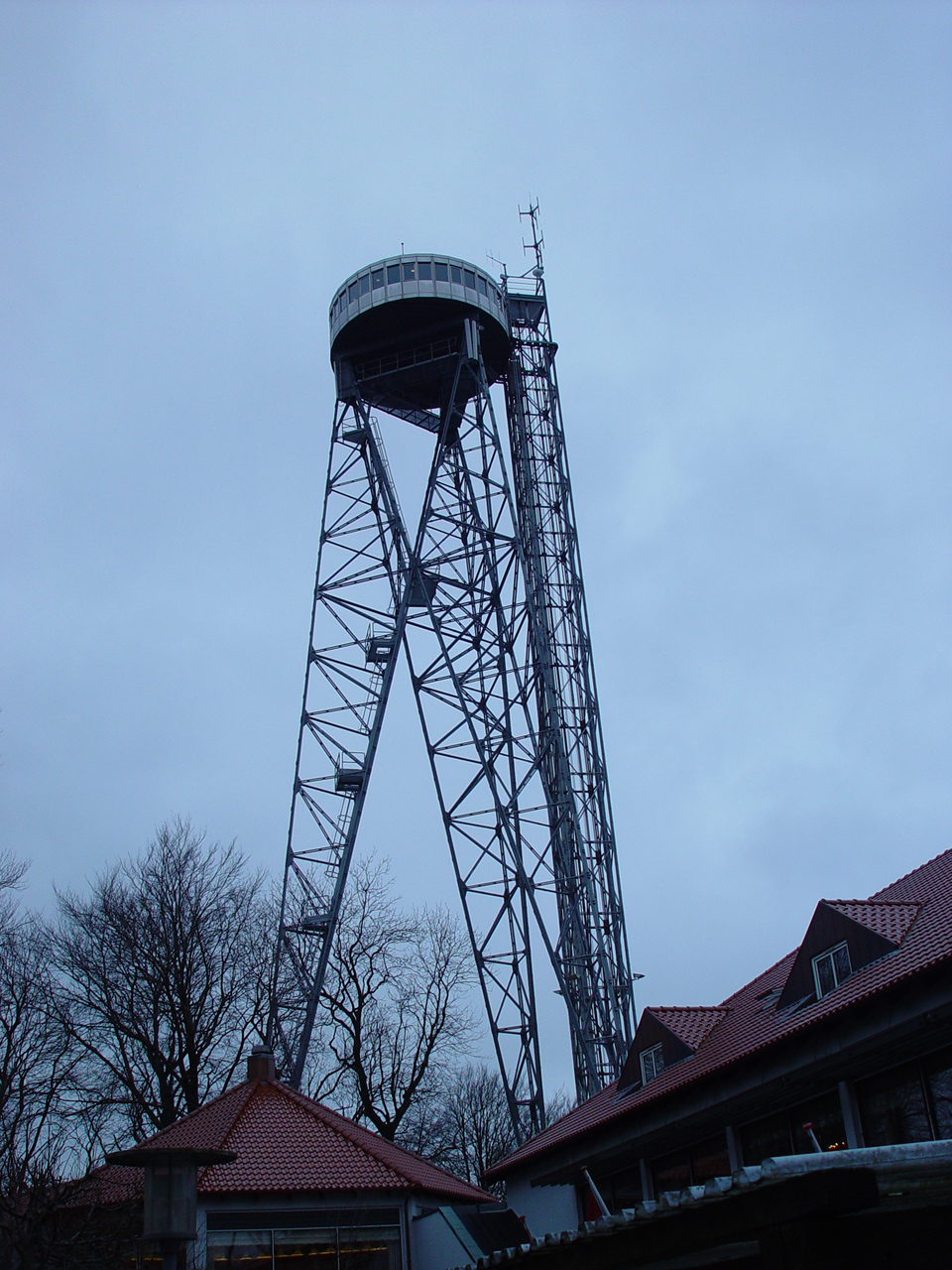
Aalborg Tower

Logo

Aalborgtårnet (Aalborg Tower) is a 54.9-metre-tall (180 ft) observation tower built of lattice steel in Aalborg, Denmark. The tower is built on a hill, providing a total height of 105 metres above sea level. The tower has a restaurant on the top. The tower was completed in 1933, and underwent a major reconstruction from February to March 2005, in which the whole tower was pulled down and later reerected.

== See also ==
- List of towers
