= Østre Anlæg (Aalborg) =

City park in Denmark

Coordinates: 57.043844°N 9.940181°E

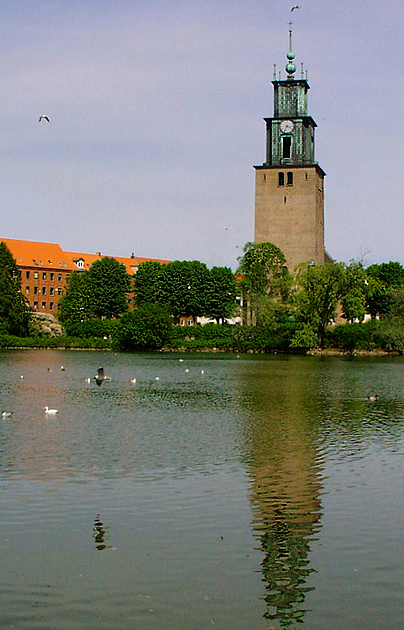
St. Mark's Church overlooking the park

Østre Anlæg is a city park in Aalborg, Denmark. The 6.5 hectares (16 acres) park on Bonnesensgade is one of the oldest in the city. There are approximately 175,000 visitors per year. Used as a dumping area in the 1920s, it was converted into a recreational area in the next two decades. A playground was added in 1937. In addition to lawn areas, bushes, flowers, and trees, the park contains a lake, which is overlooked by St. Mark's Church on the east. Fifty-one species of bird have been recorded.
