= P. S. Krøyer's paintings of Marie =

Overview of P. S. Krøyer's paintings of his wife

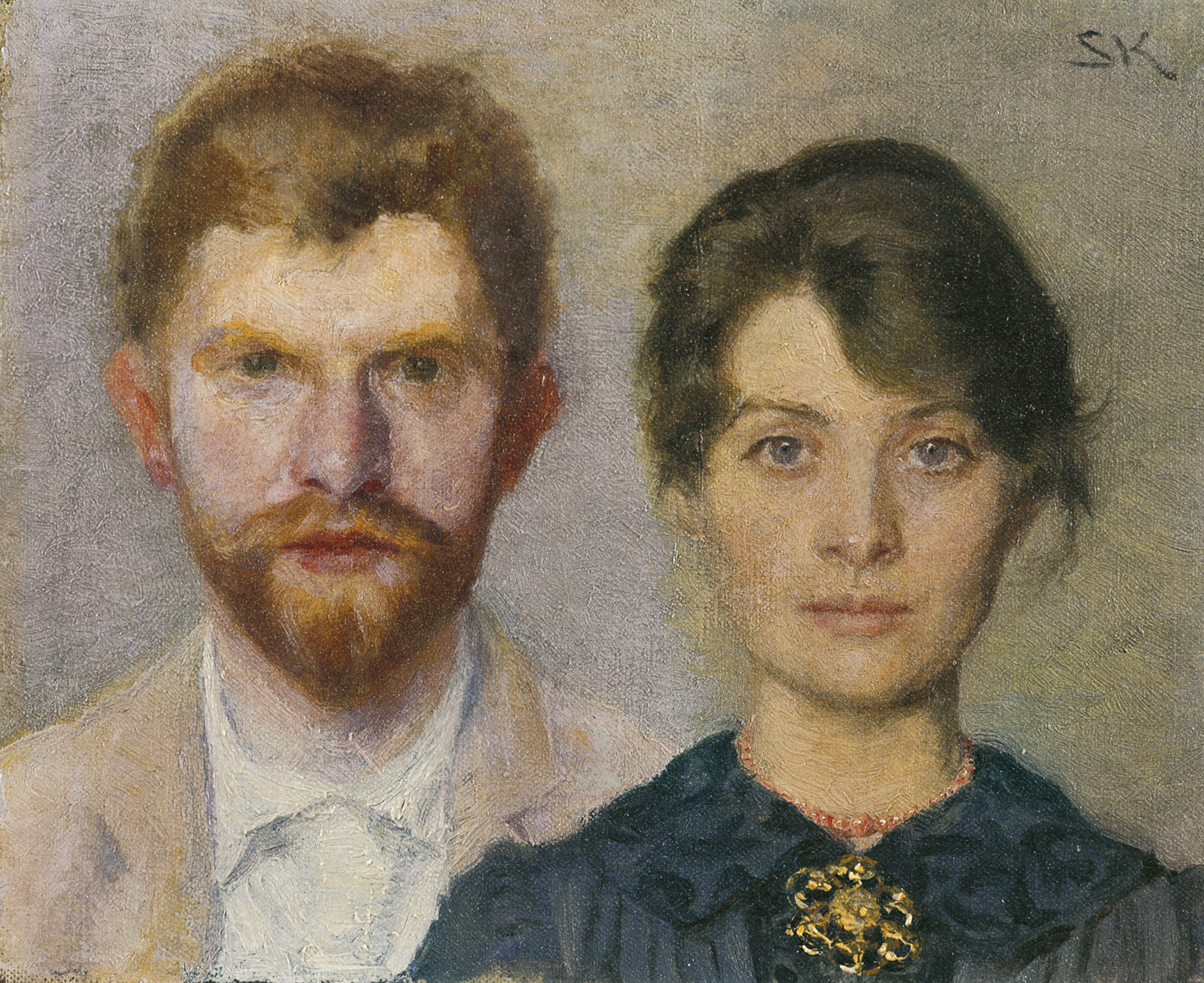
Dual portrait of Marie and P. S. Krøyer, 1890. Krøyer painted Marie, and Marie painted him.

Peder Severin Krøyer painted various portraits of his wife, Marie Krøyer née Triepcke, a fellow Danish artist who was said to be one of the most beautiful women in Copenhagen. Norwegian-born Peder had met and painted Marie in Copenhagen but fell in love with her when they met in Paris in 1889. After a honeymoon in northern Jutland and Italy, the couple settled in Skagen on the northern tip of Jutland in 1891, joining the group of artists that became known as the Skagen Painters.

The first few years of their marriage were reasonably happy, leading to the birth of their daughter Vibeke in 1895, but as a result of P. S. Krøyer's periods of mental illness, by the early 1900s they spent ever more time apart. In 1902, Marie began an affair with the Swedish composer Hugo Alfvén, with whom she became pregnant in 1905. Thereafter she spent most of her time with Alfvén in Sweden, marrying him in 1912, three years after Krøyer had died in Skagen.

Krøyer's paintings of Marie between 1888 and 1906 present a record of the years they spent together. They show some of their most enjoyable times but also hint at the marital tension that increased as time went by. Among the most notable paintings of her are Summer Evening at Skagen. The Artist's Wife and Dog by the Shore (1892), one of Denmark's most popular works, which shows Marie on the beach with their dog and with the moonlight reflected in the sea, Roses (1893), which depicts her relaxing in the garden, and Summer Evening at Skagen Beach – The Artist and his Wife (1899). Also of note are the depictions of Marie on holiday in Ravello on the Amalfi Coast of Italy in 1890; the portrait for the frieze in the dining room at Skagen's Brøndums Hotel; Chez Moi, a series of watercolours of Marie and the couple's daughter Vibeke in the family homes in Copenhagen and Skagen; and Midsummer Eve Bonfire on Skagen Beach, his last painting of her in which she is shown captured in the firelight with Alfvén.

== Background and early relationship ==
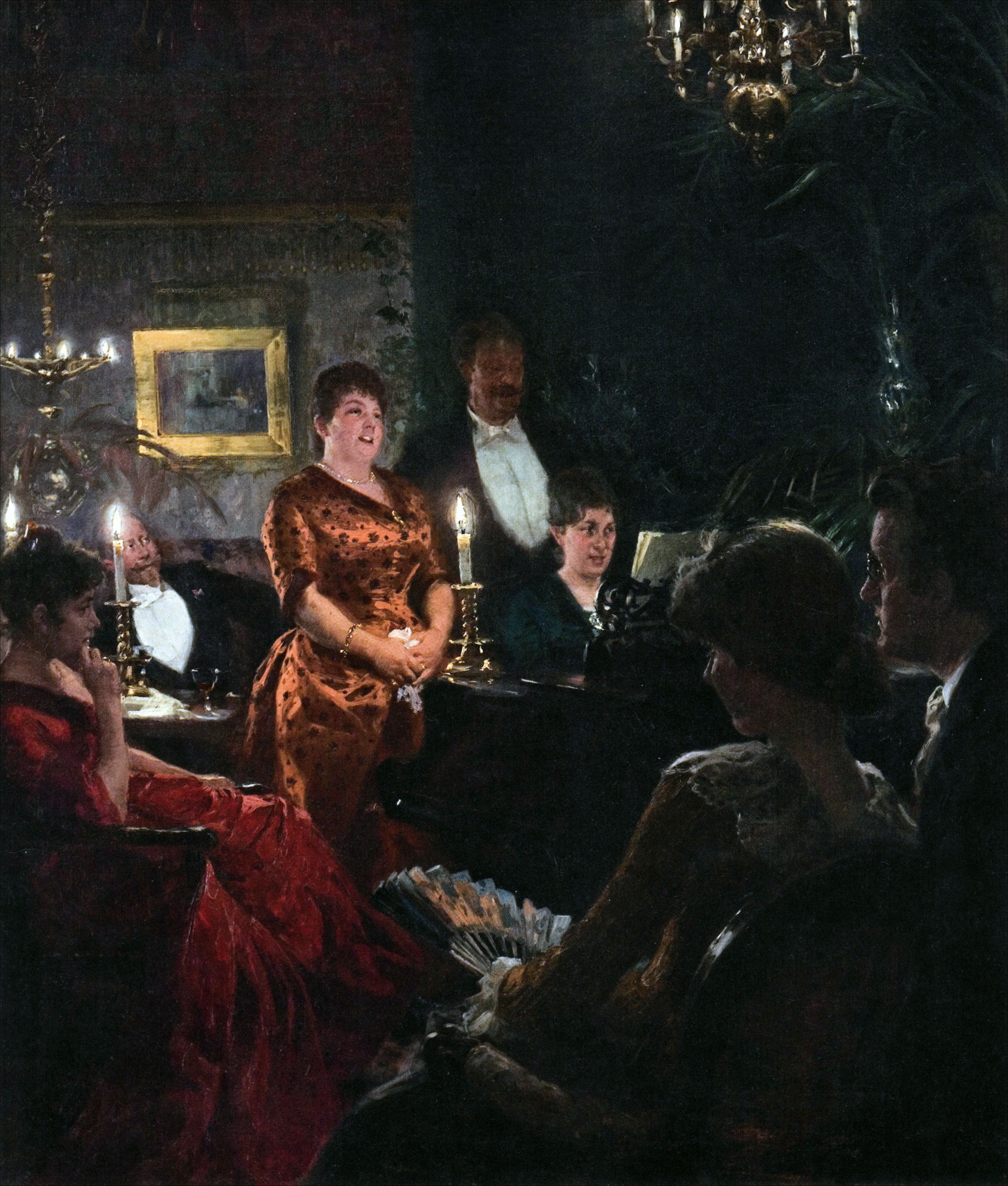
A Duet (1887)

The Skagen Painters were a close-knit group of mainly Danish artists who gathered each summer from the late 1870s in the fishing village of Skagen in the far north of Jutland, painting the local fishermen and their own family life and celebrations. Peder Severin Krøyer (1851–1909), who was born in Stavanger, Norway, but brought up in Copenhagen, first arrived in Skagen in 1882 and returned almost every summer. He had already gained a reputation for his paintings of the fishermen in Hornbæk on the north coast of Zealand and had been influenced by the Impressionist movement during his travels to France. In Skagen, he became one of the central and most enthusiastic members of the artistic community.

Marie Krøyer (1867–1940) came from an affluent German family who had moved to Copenhagen. From an early age she aspired to become an artist and after private training she went to study in Paris where Krøyer began to court her. It is believed Marie was subsequently reluctant to paint as she looked up to Krøyer as a far more accomplished artist. A few of her works have nevertheless survived.

Krøyer had visited the atelier where Marie was studying on several occasions, but the first of his works in which she appears is A Duet, painted in Heinrich Hirschsprung's Copenhagen home in 1887 where she had been invited to model for him. She can be seen seated on the left of the painting in a red dress.

Krøyer next met Marie in early 1889 in Paris where she was continuing her studies. Although he was 16 years her senior, he fell madly in love with her. That July, they were married in Augsburg in southern Germany, where Marie's parents were residing. Rather than joining the artists' colony in Skagen directly, the Krøyers chose to spend their honeymoon alone in the little fishing village of Stenbjerg in Thy in the northwest of Jutland. They stayed at the local inn for two months, taking their easels down to the beach each day to paint. In addition to portraits of Marie in the inn, one of Krøyer's paintings shows her seated at her easel on the beach. Measuring 35 x 24 cm, the picture of Marie in her room at the inn is titled Interior with the Artist's Wife and signed "Til Marie. S. Krøyer, Stenbjerg Septbr 1889". It is now in the Hirschsprung Collection of Copenhagen.

The portrait of Marie in a midnight blue dress is believed to have been painted shortly before their stay in Stenbjerg. Krøyer presented it to his new parents-in-law on the occasion of their silver wedding on 17 October 1889. Marie commented on Stenbjerg in a letter to her friends Agnes and Harald Slott-Møller: "I would certainly recommend Stenbjerg to you. It is a really pleasant place for a stay, such nice people; and the nature is impressive — but not at all pretty. Indeed it is rather desolate and saddening."

In 1890, the couple created the double portrait (pictured above) in which they painted each other. The same year they travelled to Italy where they continued their honeymoon in Ravello and Amalfi. The small oil-on-canvas work Interior. Marie Krøyer painting. Ravello shows Marie painting while they were there. They also visited the artist Kristian Zahrtmann who spent his summers in the house he had bought in Civita d'Antino, high up in the mountains in the Abruzzo region some 150 km (90 miles) south of Rome. Thanks to his enthusiasm, the town became a favourite destination for Scandinavian painters. In addition to Marie, the lunch scene includes Zahrtmann and Krøyer himself.

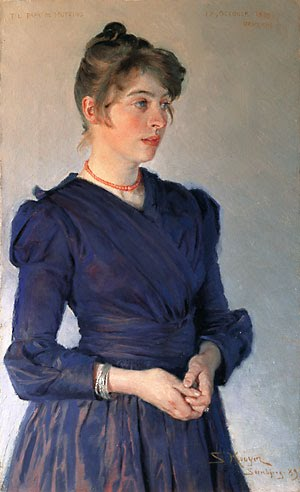
Marie in a blue dress (1889)

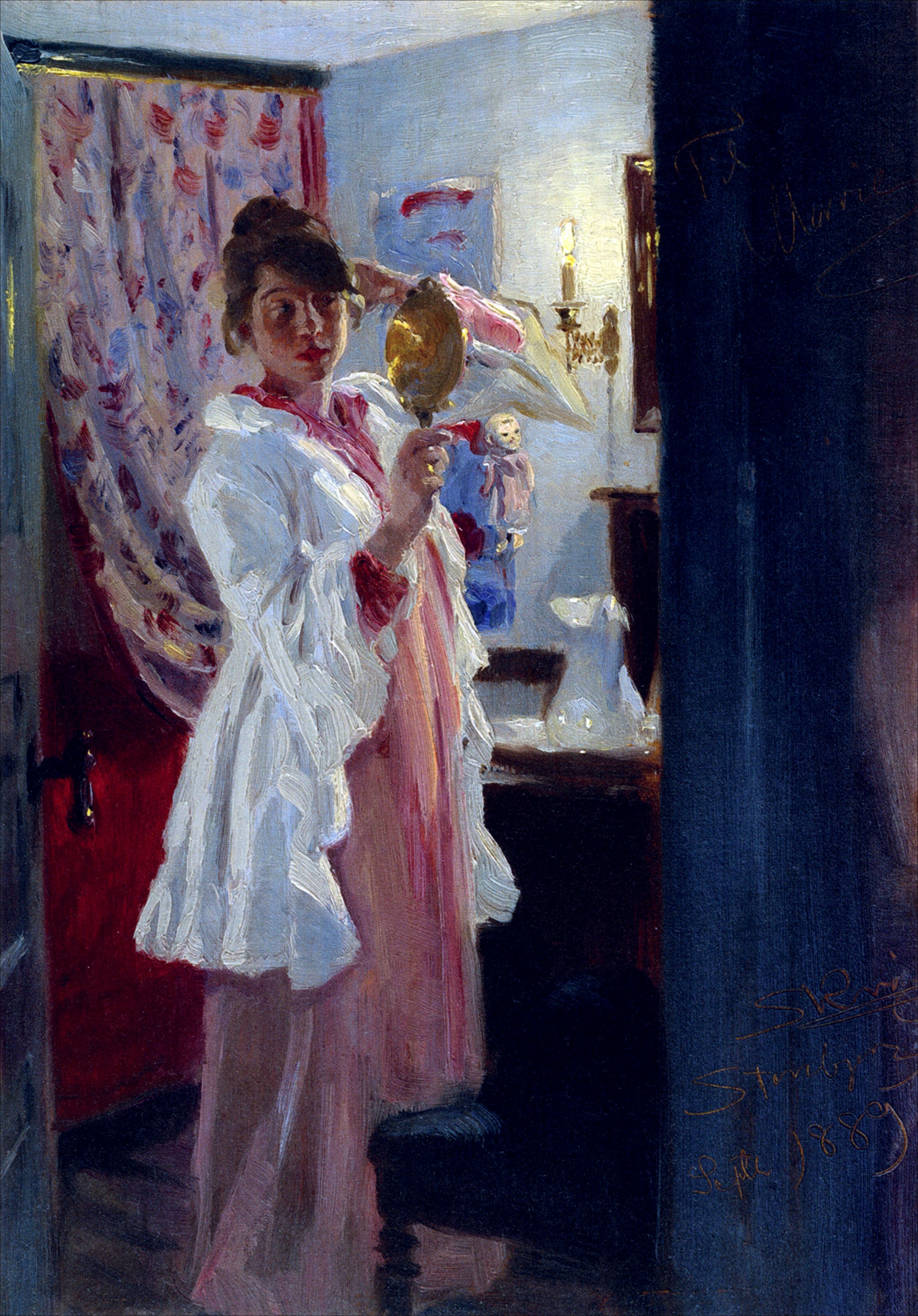
Marie in her room at Stenbjerg Inn (1889)

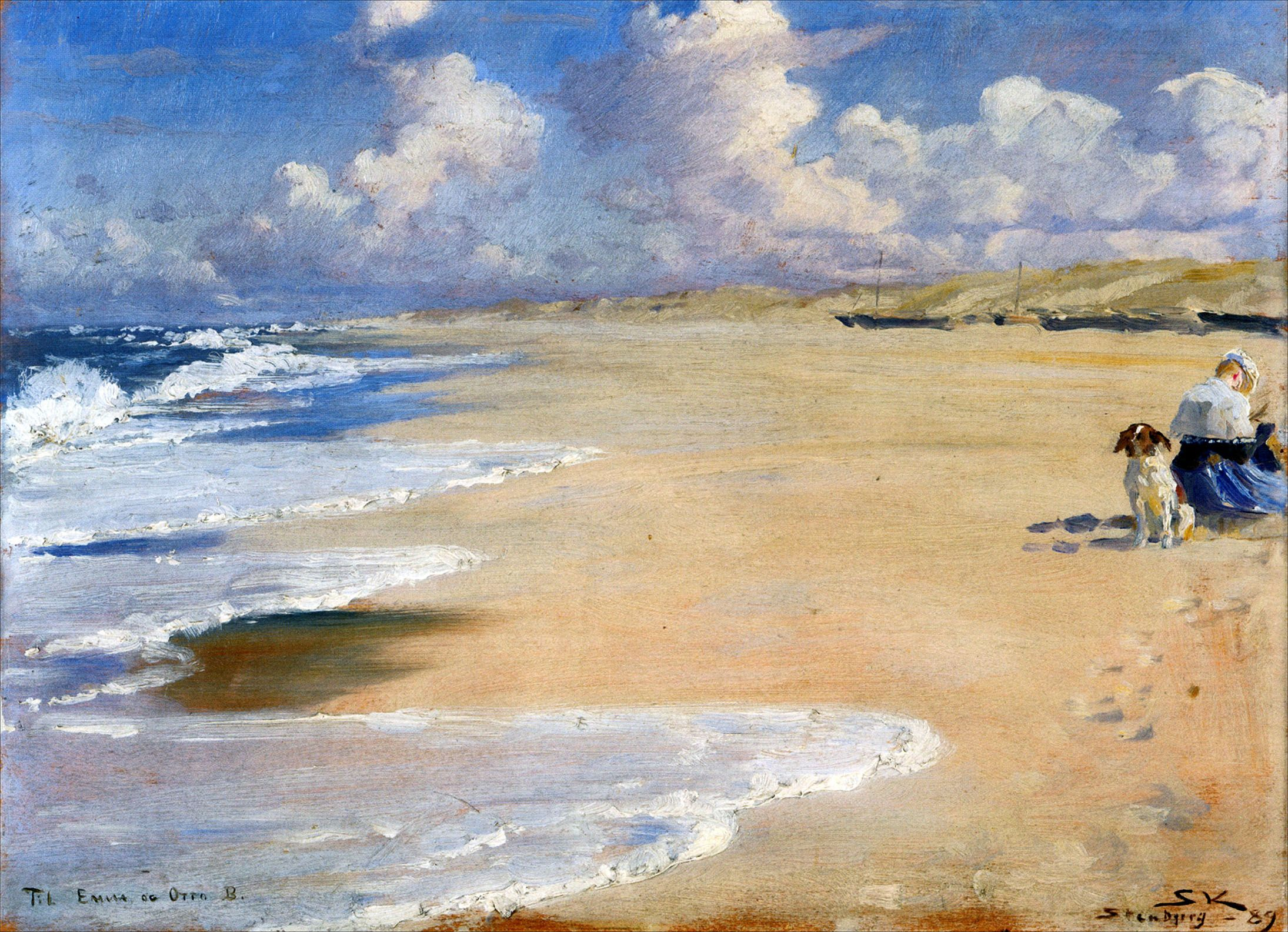
Stenbjerg with Marie painting on the beach (1889)

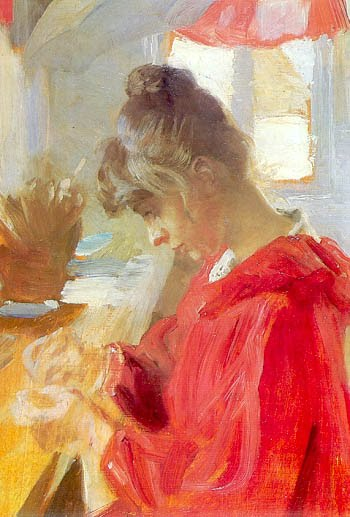
Marie at a table sewing (1889)
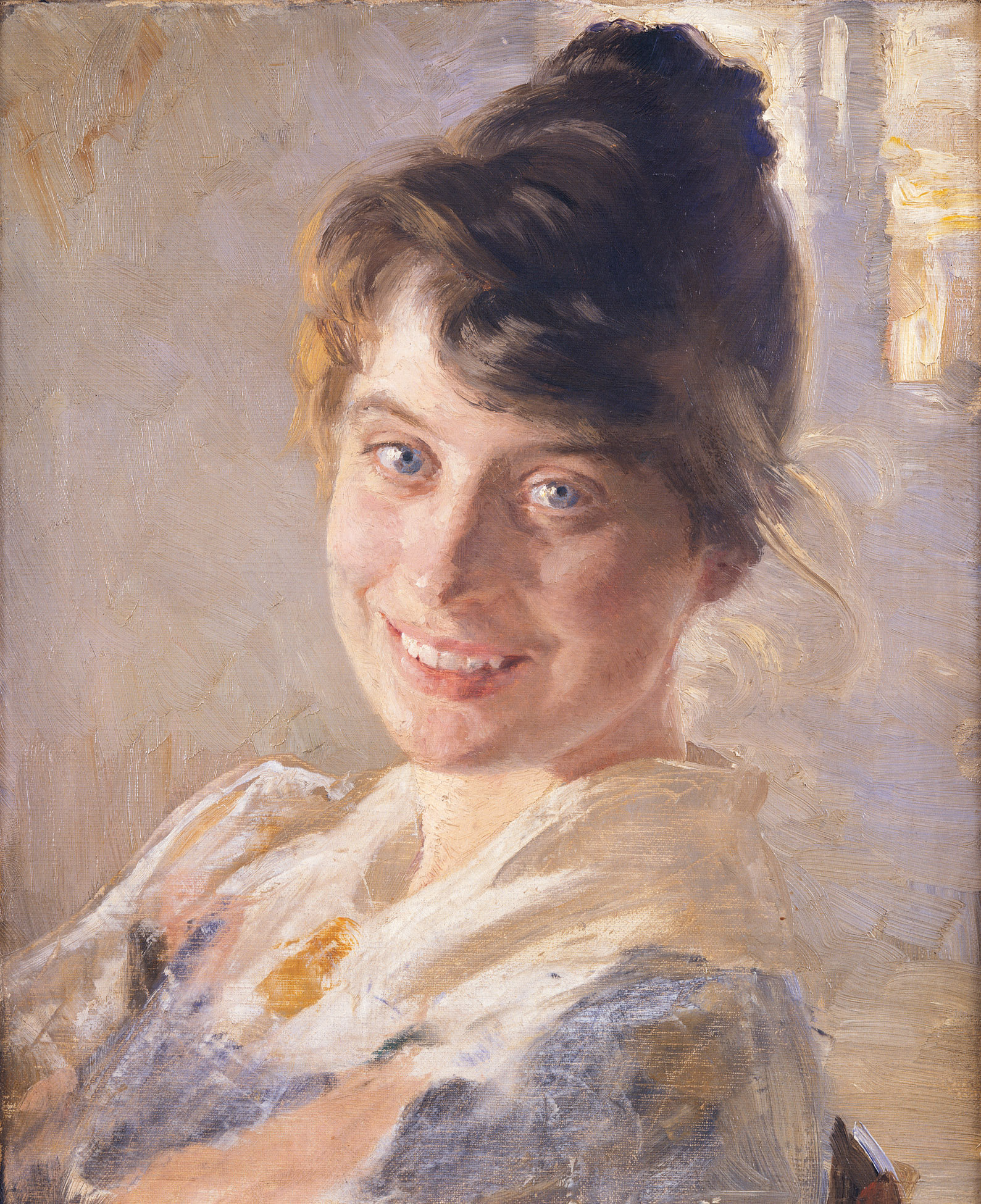
Marie Krøyer (1890)

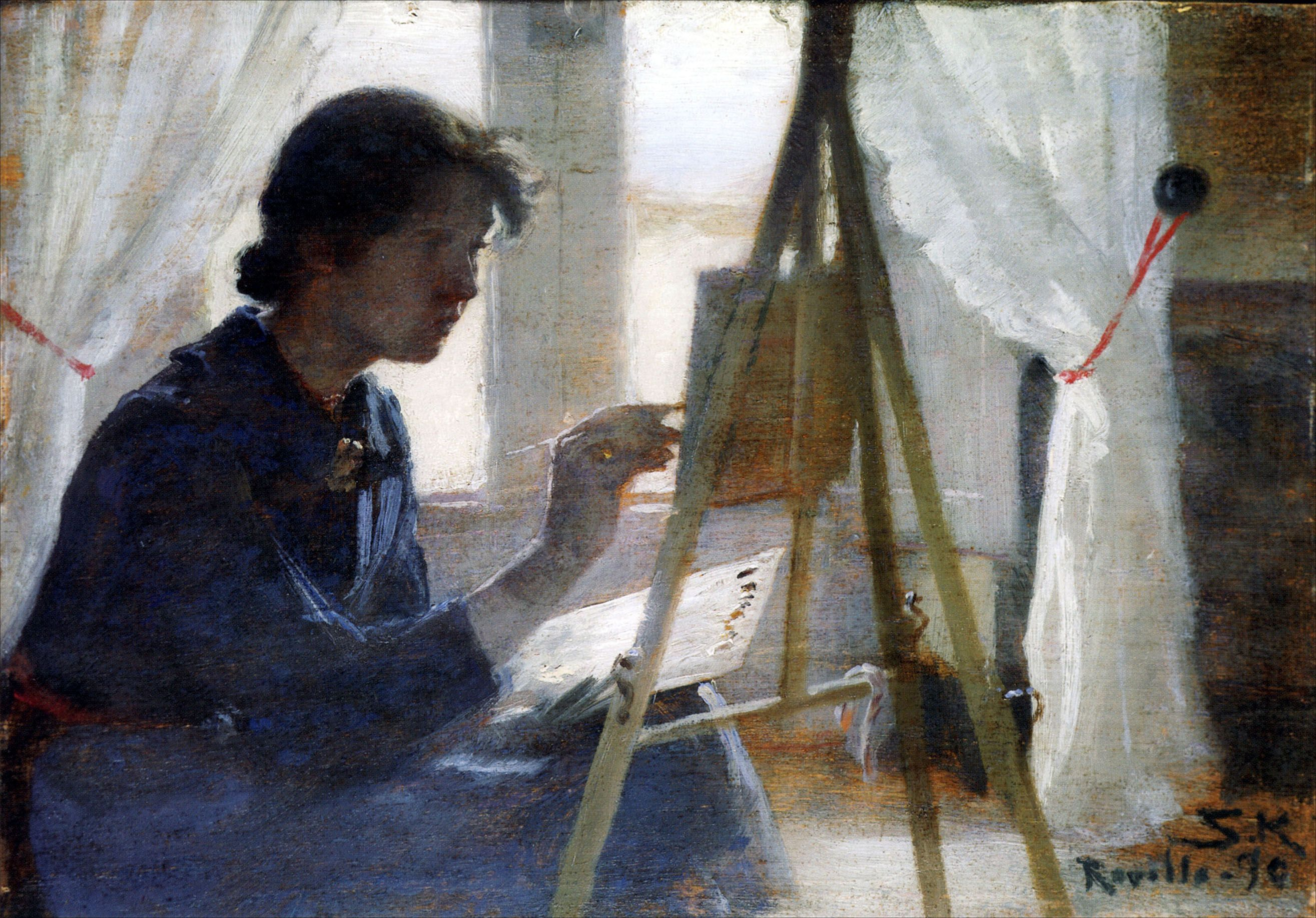
Interior. Marie painting. Ravello (1890)

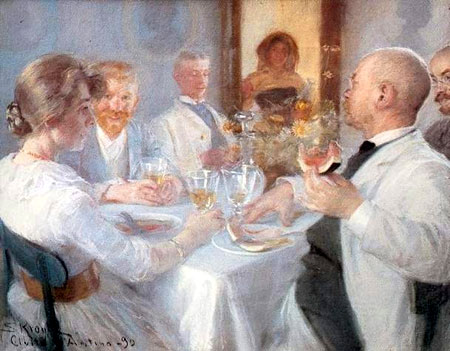
At the Lunch Table in Civita d'Antino (1890)

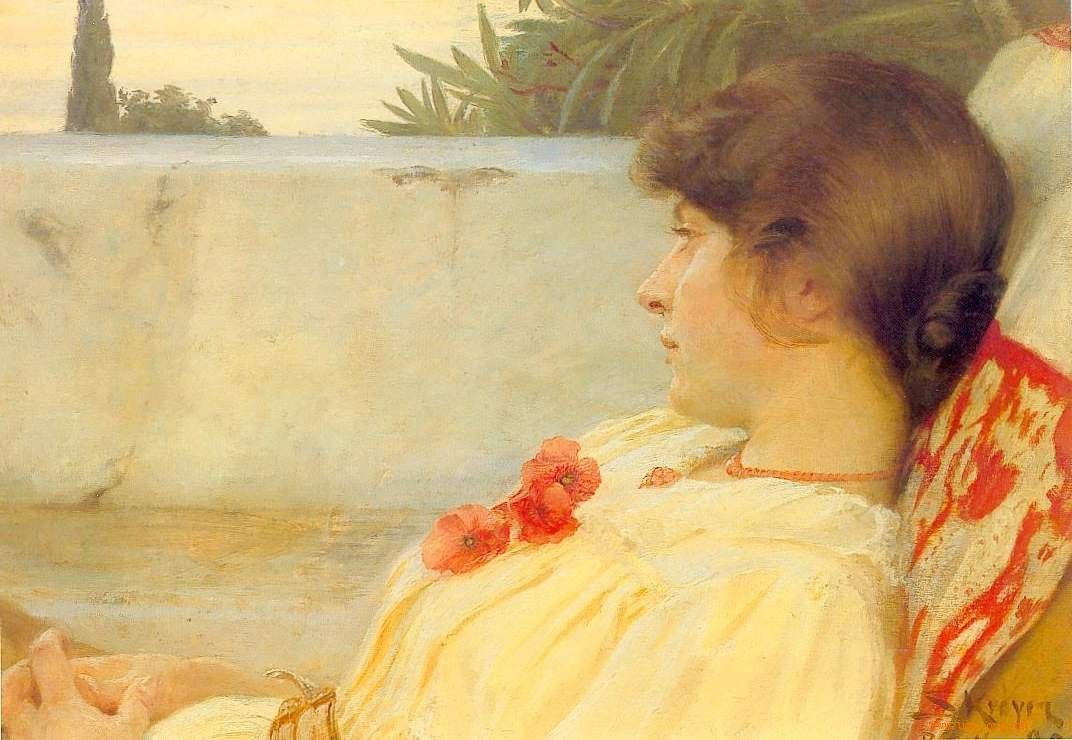
Marie. Ravello (1890)

== In Skagen ==
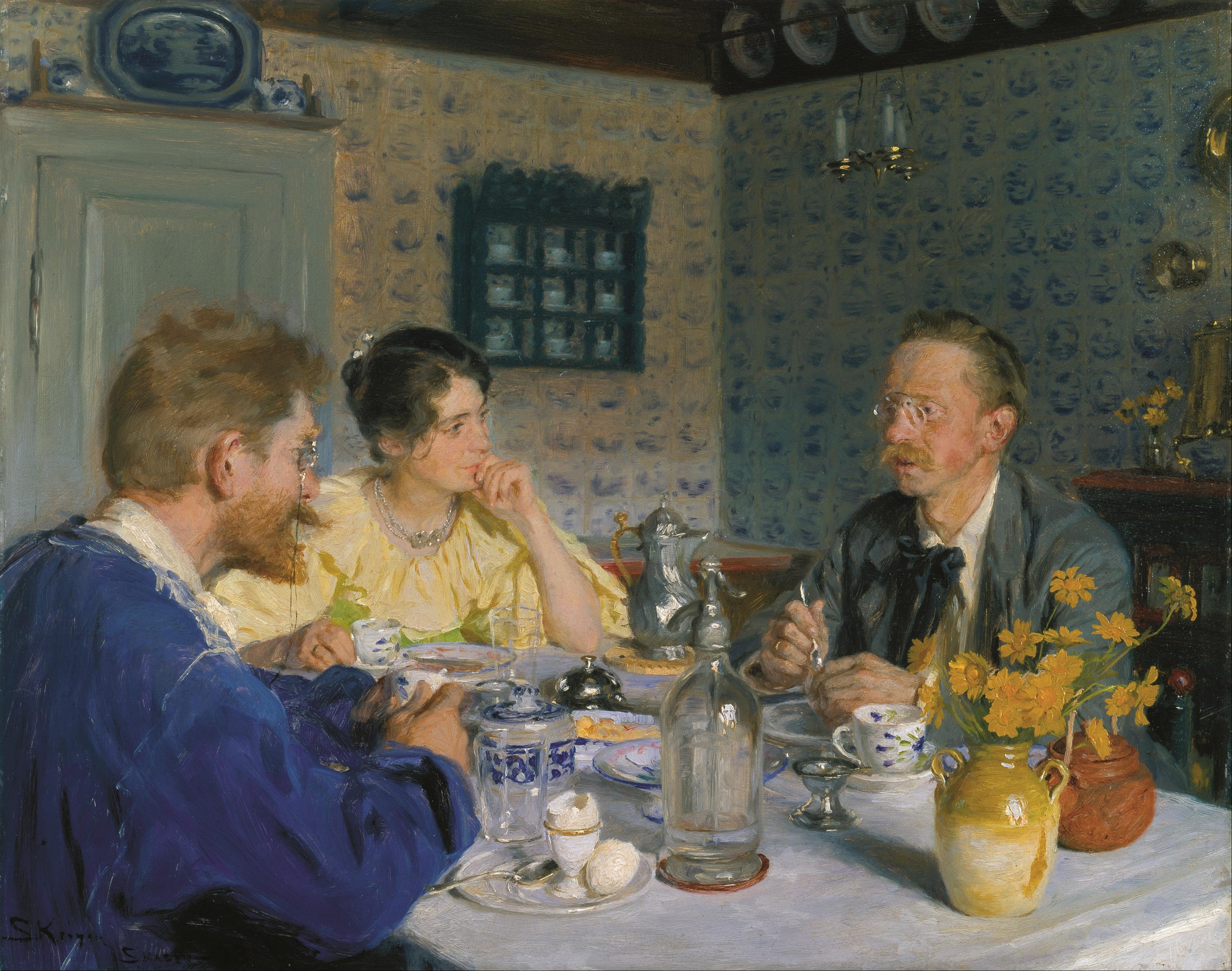
A luncheon. The artist, his wife and the writer Otto Benzon, 1893 "Luncheon" is a mistranslation of the Danish as the breakfast setting shows.

Most of Krøyer's paintings featuring Marie were painted in Skagen, which attracted a considerable number of artists who preferred to paint "en plein air" rather than to be constrained by the rather rigid approaches of the Scandinavian art academies. Both Krøyers had already visited Skagen independently before they married. The summers Krøyer spent with his wife in the 1890s were clearly a source of inspiration for him, especially as Marie had a strong sense of beauty herself, often quoting Keats' "Beauty is truth, truth beauty".

From 1891 to 1894, they spent their summers renting Madam Bendsen's house in Skagen Vesterby where the writer Otto Benzon paid them a visit in 1893. In A luncheon. The artist, his wife and the writer Otto Benzon (1893), Marie and her husband can be seen listening to Benzon attentively. Krøyer's own presence at the table indicates that the painting might well have been based on a photograph. He had bought his first camera in 1885 and by the 1890s had become a keen photographer. The English title of the painting is certainly a mistranslation from the Danish Ved frokosten. Kunstneren, hans hustru og forfatteren Otto Benzon. At the time "frokost" meant breakfast rather than lunch as can be seen here from the coffee pot, coffee cups and boiled eggs.

=== Frieze portrait ===
A portrait of Marie closely resembling a photograph by Krøyer was completed in 1891. The following year, it was added to the frieze in the dining room at Skagen's Brøndums Hotel which had become the artists' favourite meeting place. Placed next to Krøyer's own portrait, it confirmed Marie's position as an accepted member of the Skagen Painters. The dining room was designed by the architects Ulrik Plesner and Thorvald Bindesbøll in connection with the first major expansion of the hotel in 1892. At Krøyer's suggestion, it was decided to incorporate Degn Brøndum's art collection into its decoration. Over the years it became a custom that visiting artists donated portraits of each other to the hotel owner and these were placed in a frieze just under the ceiling. Today the dining room together with its frieze forms part of Skagens Museum.

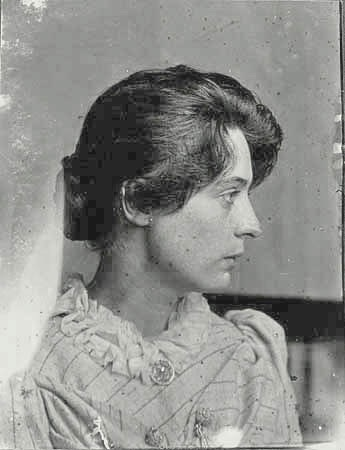
Photo by Krøyer (1891)

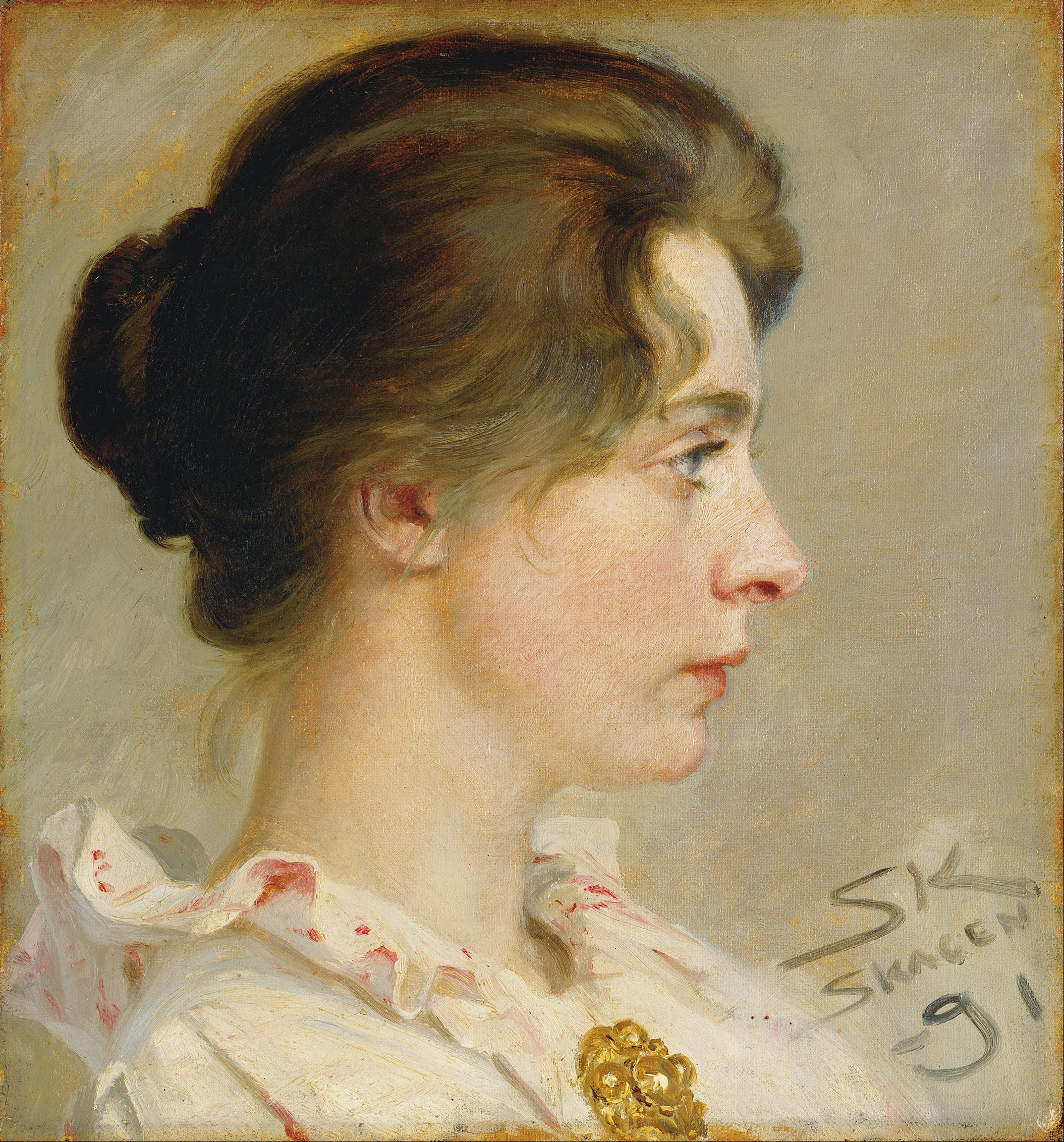
Marie Krøyer. Skagen (1891)

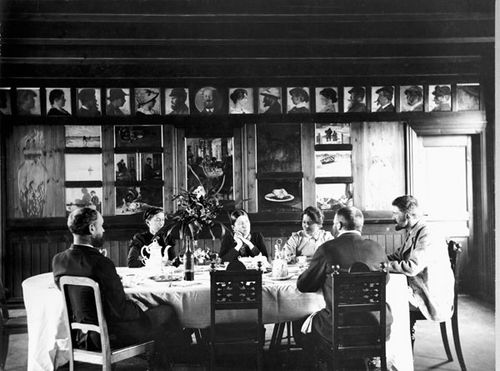
The frieze in Brøndums Hotel (c. 1892)

=== Roses ===
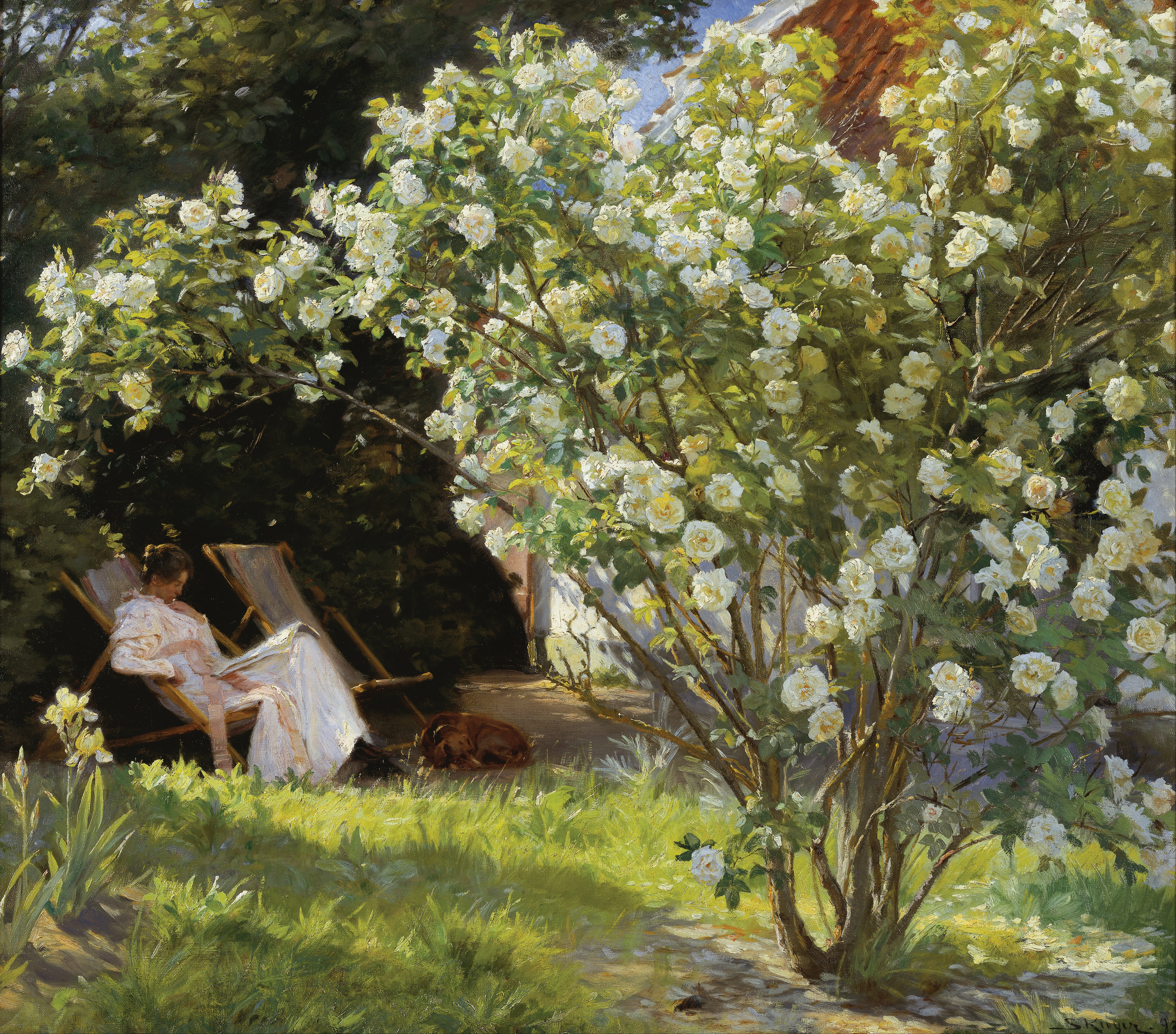
Roses (1893)

In 1893, Krøyer included Marie in Roses, in which she is shown relaxing in the garden at Madam Bendsen's house. The original title is Roser. Haveparti fra Skagen med kunstnerens hustru siddende i en havestol (Roses. Garden Scene from Skagen with the Artist's Wife Sitting in a Deckchair). It too, may be based on photographs; the Hirschsprung Collection has a number of shots showing a very similar scene. The painting is interesting in that its treatment of light and shadow shows how Krøyer had been influenced by the French Impressionists while he was in Paris. Marie, framed by the overhanging roses, is shown reading a newspaper; to her left is another empty deckchair which was probably where Krøyer would have sat. The Krøyers' dog, Rap, who features in a number of Krøyer's works, lies sleeping at Marie's feet.

The painting was sold for 3.1 million Danish kroner in 1985 and was donated anonymously to the Skagens Museum in 2008.

=== On the beach ===
Summer Evening at Skagen. The Artist's Wife and Dog by the Shore, one of Denmark's most popular works, was painted in 1892. It shows Marie standing on the beach with Rap by her side and the moonlight reflected in the sea. She is shown in profile and her melancholy face and bright dress glow under the light of the setting sun. The painting is one of the works in which Krøyer tries to capture the light and mood on the Skagen shore during what he called "l'heure bleue" (the blue hour), the short period at dusk when the light casts a blue tint over the landscape. The Symbolists believed the twilight hour heralded the coming of death. The moon's reflection adds a slight feeling of depth to the otherwise flat background which consists mostly of the monolithic blue sea. Marie is depicted as being at a similar height to the viewer, but the horizon rises above her head, emphasizing her radiance against the muted, nearly monochrome background.

Although it is an open-air scene, the painting Anna Ancher and Marie Krøyer on the beach at Skagen was completed in the studio from photographs Krøyer took one evening on the beach. Krøyer was not altogether happy with the results as he had needed to illuminate the photograph in the studio and hence felt that the light in the scene was not true to nature and that the mishmash of natural and artificial light had rendered the picture "two paintings in one". In 1990, an exhibition by the Hirschsprung Collection revealed a number of photographs Krøyer had used as a basis for his paintings, including the one behind Anna Ancher and Marie Krøyer on the beach at Skagen.

In 1895, Krøyer wrote to his friend Oscar Björck: "I am also thinking of painting a large portrait of my wife and me together — but for that I shall definitely need good weather, so it won't be this year." In fact it was four years later, in the summer of 1899, that he finally created the large painting Summer Evening at Skagen Beach – The Artist and his Wife. The result nevertheless has a rather melancholic tone. Despite the beautiful surroundings, Marie appears distant, disappearing into the blue moonlight. Even Krøyer's own weak figure seems to be experiencing difficulty in supporting her on his arm while the closest figure of all is Rap the dog. The painting again presents the blue half-light. Krøyer particularly appreciated "l'heure bleue": "Skagen can look so terribly dull in the bright sunlight ... but when the sun goes down, when the moon rises up out of the sea ... in recent years this has been the time I like most of all."

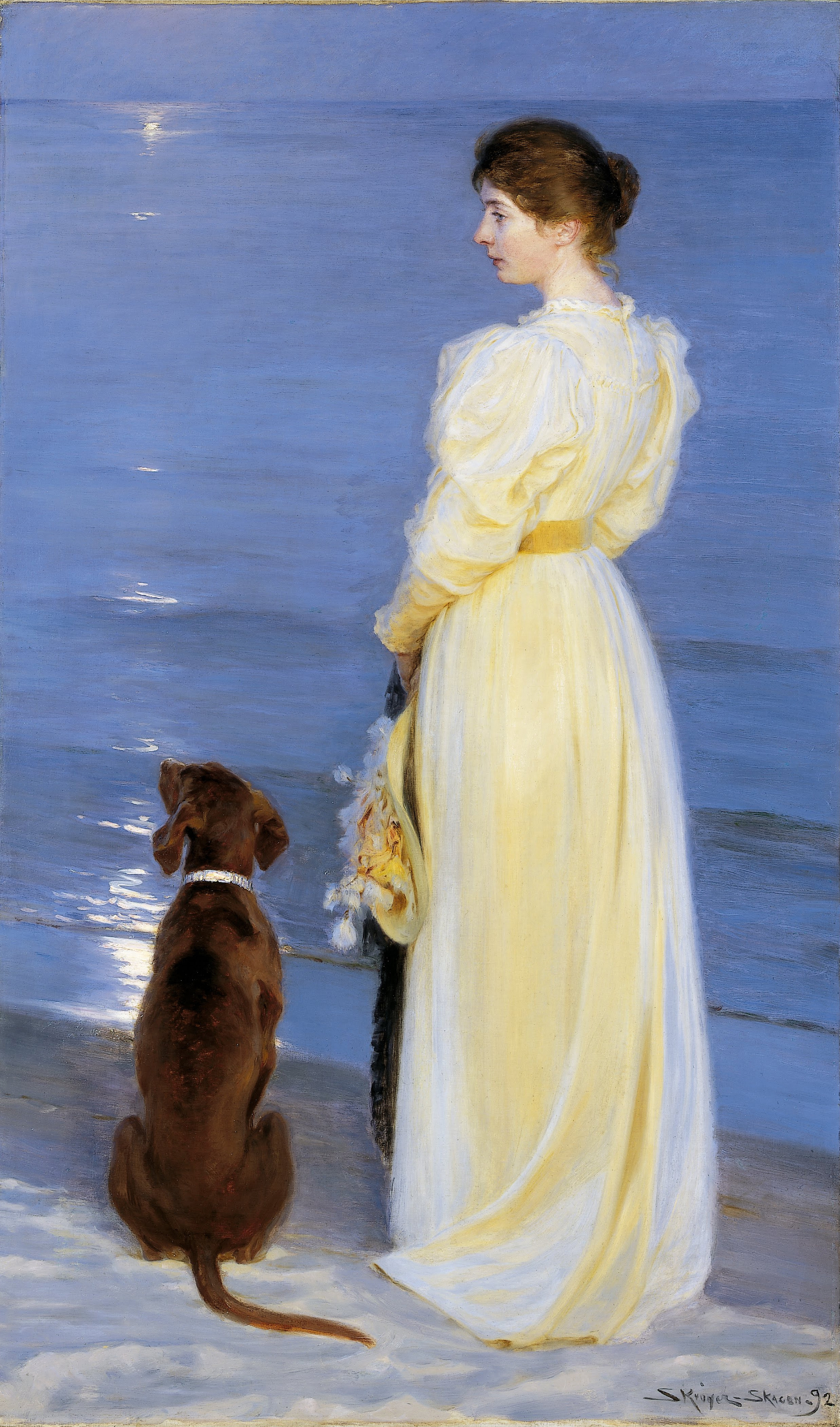
Summer Evening at Skagen (1892)

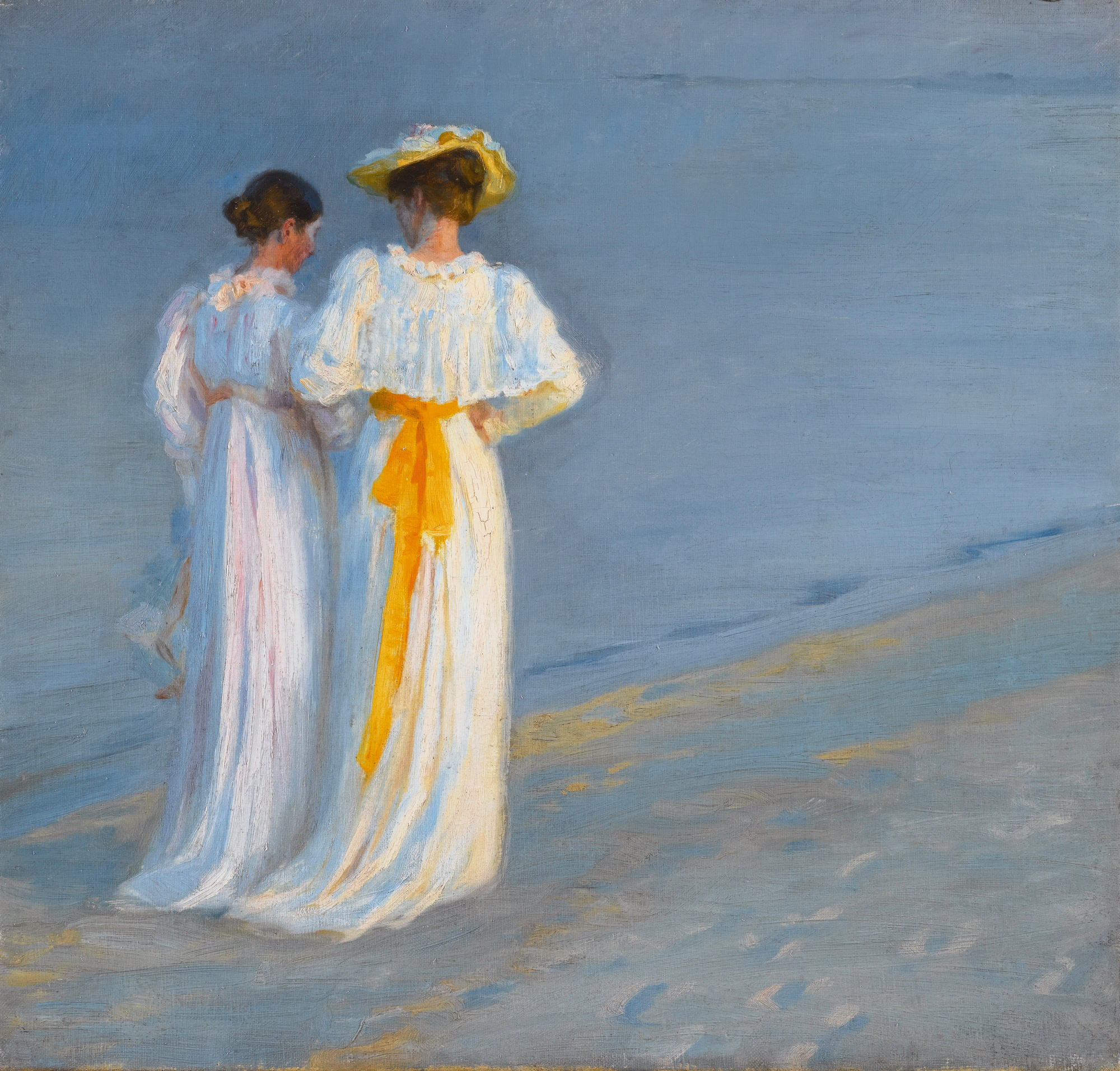
Study for Anna Ancher and Marie Krøyer on the beach at Skagen (1893)

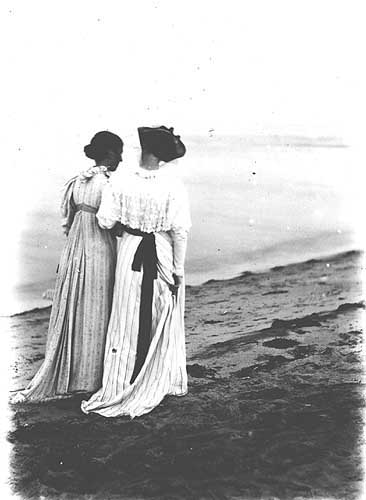
Photograph of Anna Ancher and Marie Krøyer on Skagen beach (1893)

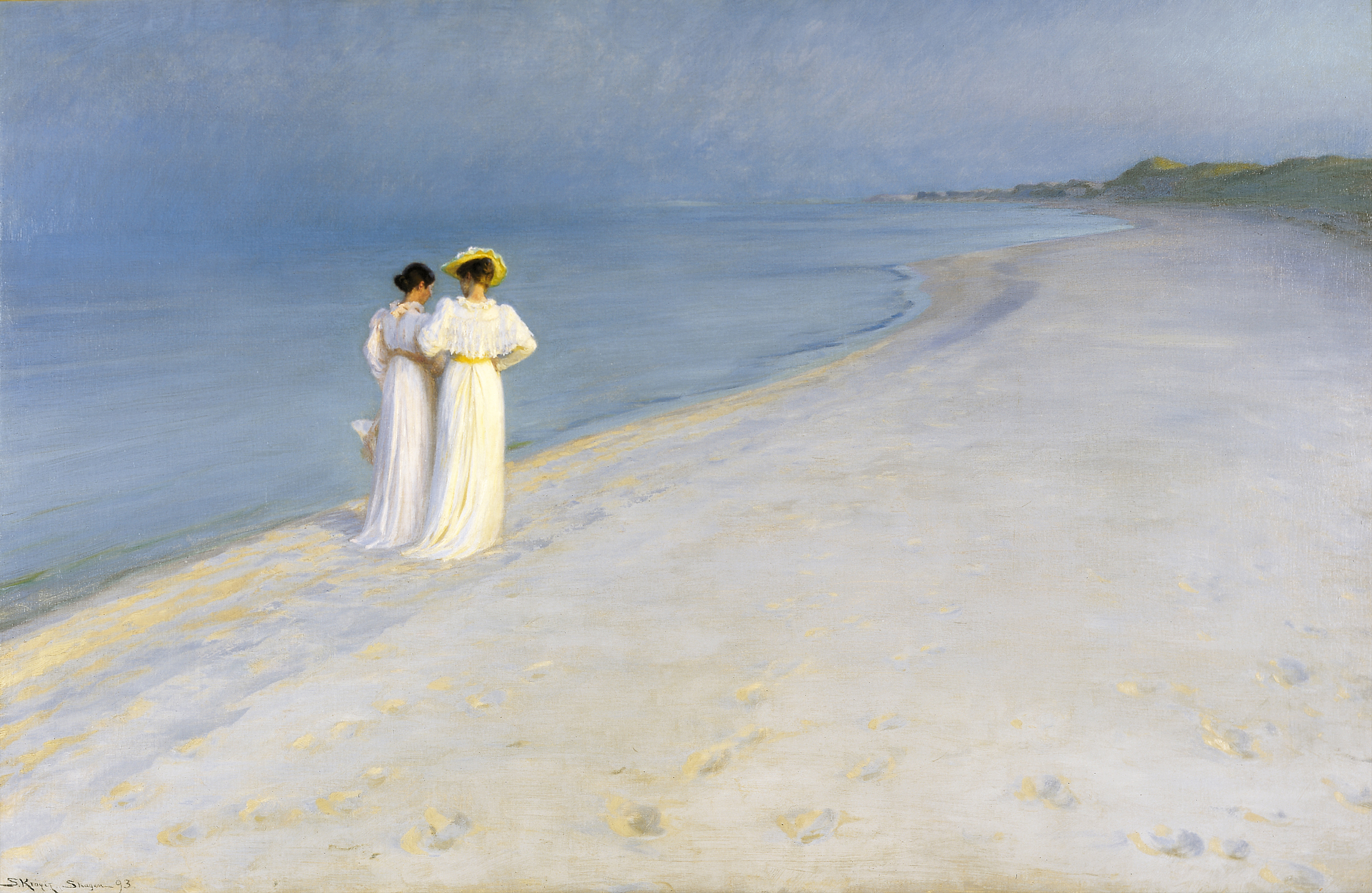
Summer evening on Skagen's Beach. Anna Ancher and Marie Krøyer walking together (1893)

Summer Evening at Skagen Beach – The Artist and his Wife (1899)

== Watercolours of home life ==
In 1898, Krøyer started Chez Moi, a series of watercolours of Marie and their daughter Vibeke in the family homes in Copenhagen and Skagen in a style inspired by the Art Nouveau approach adopted by Carl Larsson whom Krøyer probably met during his time in Paris. Larsson had started painting in watercolours while a member of the Grez-sur-Loing artists' colony in France. On returning to Sweden, he had begun a series of pictures of family life with his wife and children in Sundborn in the mid-1890s, publishing it as Ett hem (A home) in 1899. Krøyer's paintings display no signs of disturbance or frustration but leave an impression of a happy family environment, no doubt in accordance with Krøyer's own desires. He exhibited the three from Skagen in 1889 at Den Frie – the exhibition of the artists' association that had been formed in 1891 with Krøyer's support – under the collective title Fra mit Skagenshjem (From my Skagen Home).

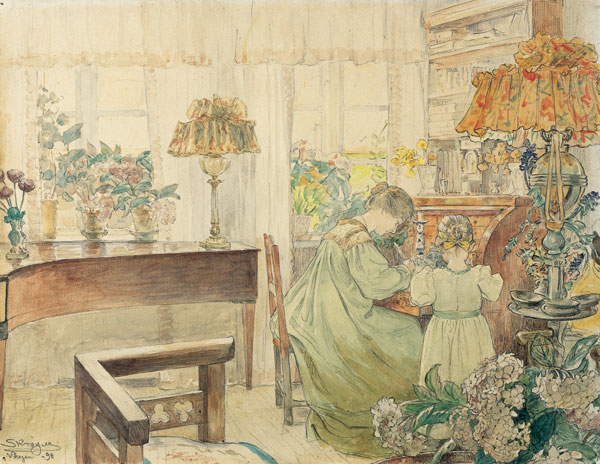
Marie and Vibeke Krøyer at the Bureau in their Home at Skagen Plantation (1898)

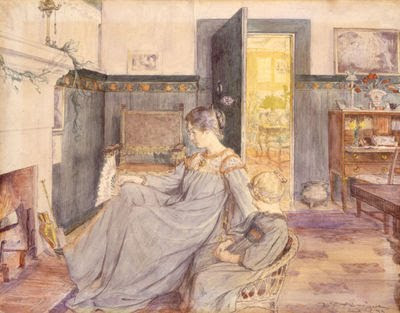
Marie and Vibeke Krøyer in Front of the Fireplace at their House in Bergensgade, Copenhagen (1898)

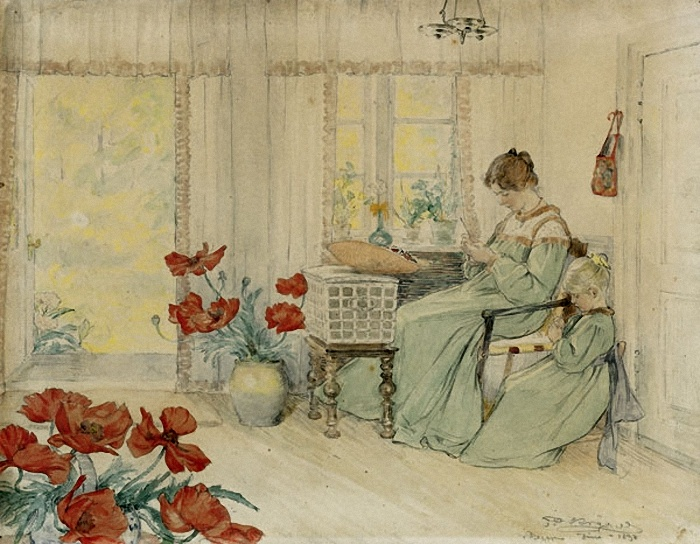
Marie and Vibeke Crocheting at their Home at Skagen Plantation (1898)

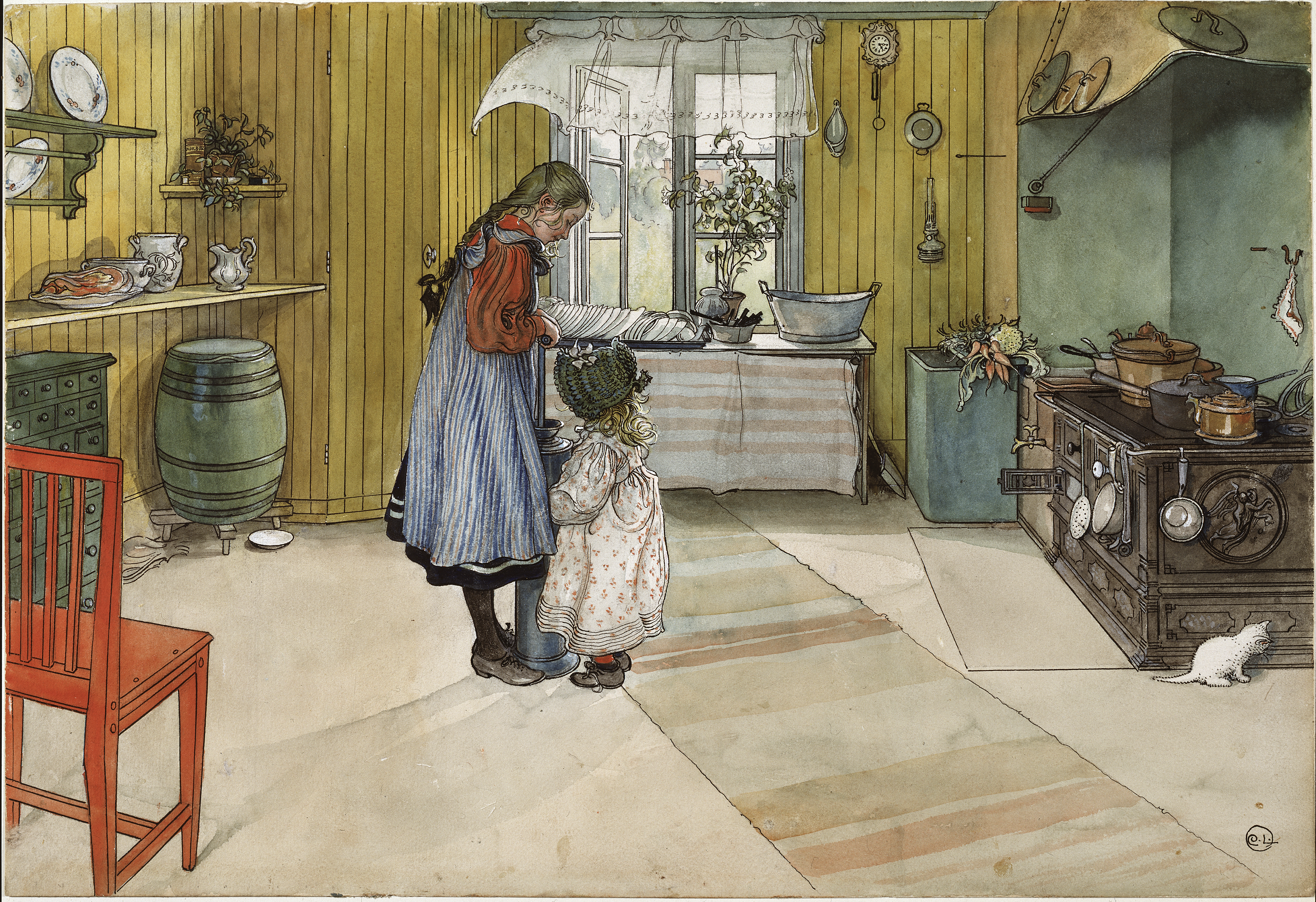
The Kitchen from Carl Larsson's Ett Hem (1899)

== Sankt Hans bonfire ==
Krøyer's Midsummer Eve Bonfire on Skagen Beach, one of the best known of his works, shows many of the Skagen artists standing around the traditional Sankt Hans Aften bonfire. He had been working on the huge painting (149.5 cm × 257 cm (58.9 in × 101.2 in)) for years before he finally completed it in 1906. Marie is standing next to a fishing boat with her new lover, Hugo Alfvén, the Swedish composer, just to the left of the flames that seem to stream towards them. Despite Alfvén's affair with Marie, Krøyer had welcomed him to the house in Skagen and appeared to tolerate their relationship. The painting is Krøyer's last major work. The preparatory pastel sketch on which it is based was produced in a couple of hours, but the painting was completed with difficulty as not only had Krøyer spent several lengthy periods in a mental hospital from 1900 but he had also begun to lose his sight, particularly in one eye. He was not altogether happy with the finished product; he thought it had become "too dark" and felt it did not capture the "pale radiance" of the sky over Skagen on Midsummer Eve. Although it is an important work in the Skagens Museum collection it is not considered to be among the best of the group portraits produced by the Skagen Painters or even by Krøyer himself. In contrast, writing in Kristeligt Dagblad, Morten Rasmussen reports that the work is considered by many to be Krøyer's "Magnum Opus", representing a reflection of his own life and a tribute to the people who contributed to his success. Marie left Krøyer for Alfvén in 1902, but it was not until 1905 when she was pregnant with Alfvén's child that Krøyer finally agreed to a divorce.

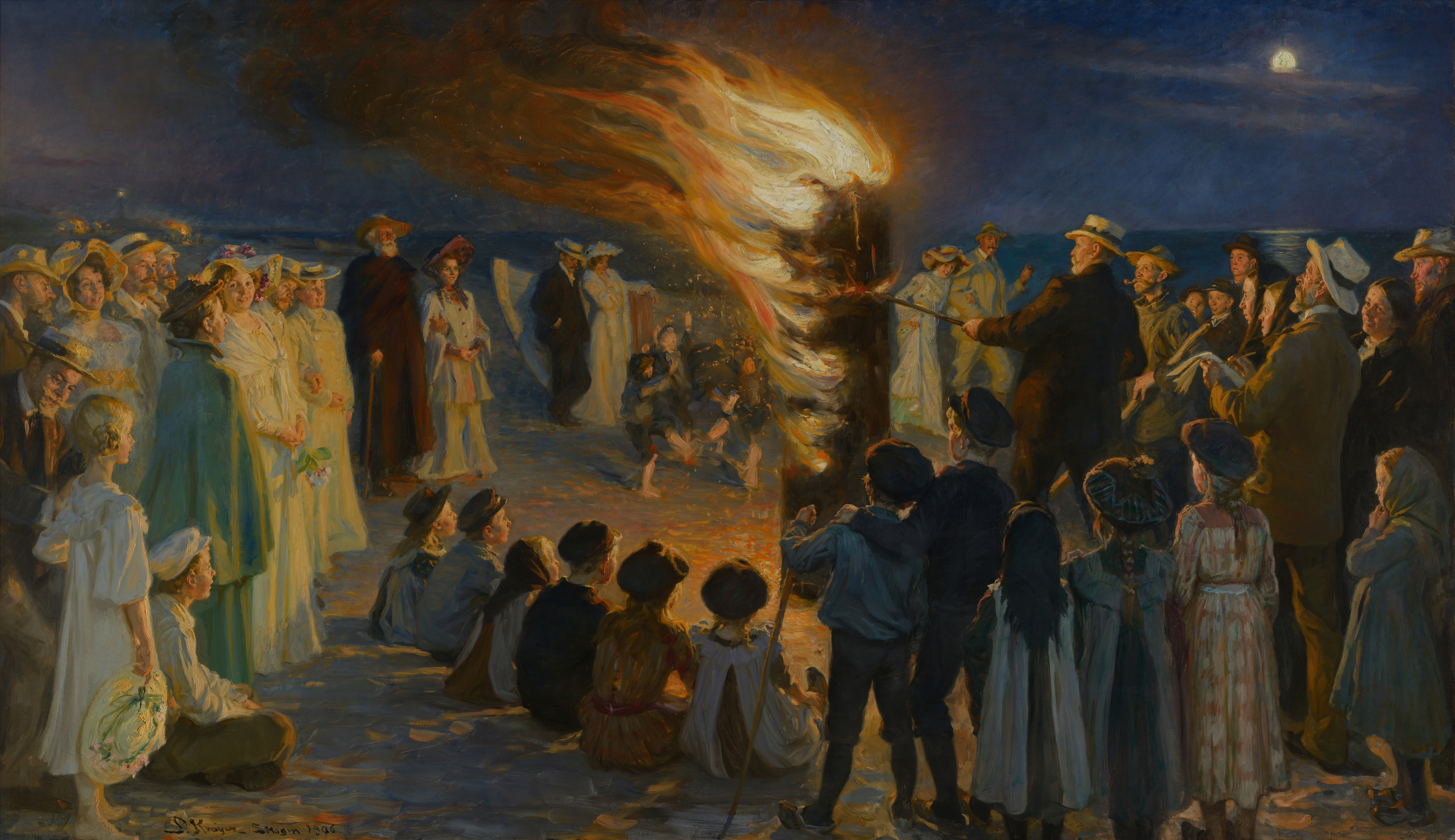
Midsummer Eve Bonfire on Skagen Beach, 1906

== Sources ==
- Svanholm, Lise (2004). Northern Light: The Skagen Painters. Gyldendal A/S. ISBN 978-87-02-02817-1.

== Literature ==
- Arnold, Anastassia (2010). Balladen om Marie: en biografi om Marie Krøyer (in Danish). Rosinante. ISBN 978-87-638-1229-0.
- Arnold, Tonni (2003). Kunsten i Marie Krøyers liv. Gyldendals Bogklubber. ISBN 978-87-00-69736-2.
- Bøgh Jensen, Mette (2012). Marie Krøyer: der skal mod til at have talent (in Danish). Skagens Museum. ISBN 978-87-91048-30-2.
- Halkier, Katrine (2011). Krøyer: An International Perspective. Hirschsprung Collection. ISBN 978-87-90597-17-7.
- Hornung, Peter Michael (2005). Peder Severin Krøyer (in Danish). Fogtdal. ISBN 978-87-7248-551-5.
- Krøyer, Peder Severin (1992). P. S. Krøyer: Tradition, Modernity. Aarhus Kunstmuseum. ISBN 978-87-88575-31-6.
- Loerges, Margrethe (1980). Marie Krøyer: portræt af kunstnerens hustru (in Danish). Hernov. ISBN 978-87-7215-928-7.
- Svanholm, Lise (2006). Damerne på Skagen (in Danish). Gyldendal A/S. ISBN 978-87-02-04499-7.
- Thage, Jacob; Holtegaard, Gl. (1997). Portraits of a Marriage: Marie and P.S. Krøyer. Skagens Museum. ISBN 978-87-88499-34-6.
- Olsen, Claus; Ireland, National Gallery of (1998). Krøyer and the artists' colony at Skagen. National Gallery of Ireland.
