= Midsummer Eve Bonfire on Skagen Beach =

Painting by Peder Severin Krøyer

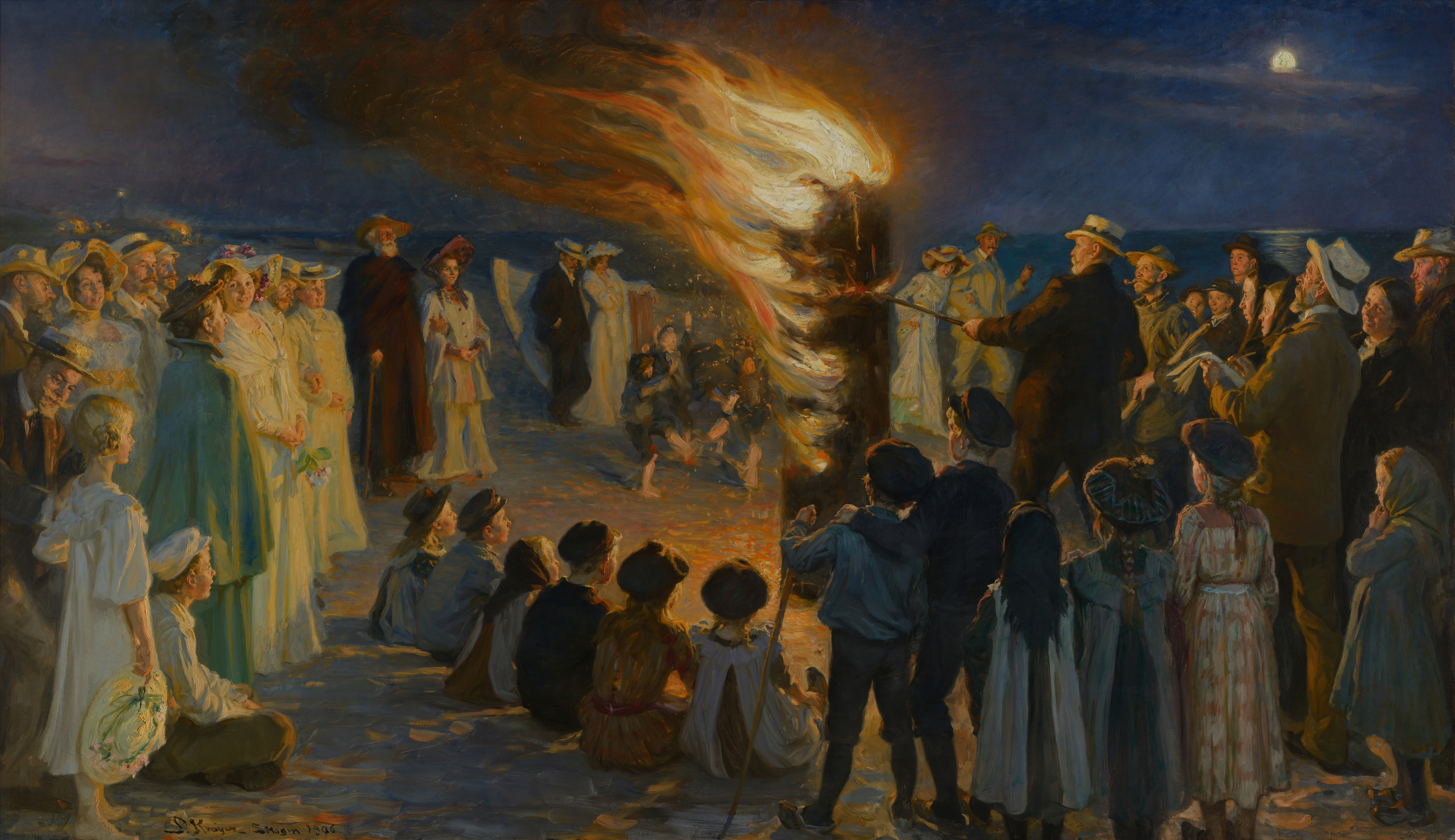
- Artist: P.S. Krøyer
- Year: 1906
- Medium: Oil on canvas
- Dimensions: 149.5 cm × 257 cm (58.9 in × 101 in)
- Location: Skagen, Denmark

Midsummer Eve Bonfire on Skagen Beach (Danish: Sankt Hansblus på Skagen strand) is a 1906 painting by the Danish artist P.S. Krøyer. The large work, which took several years to complete, shows many of the artists in the group known as the Skagen Painters as well as influential members of Skagen's local community.

== Background ==
The Skagen Painters were a close-knit group of mainly Danish artists who gathered each summer from the late 1870s in the fishing village of Skagen in the far north of Jutland, painting the local fishermen and their own gatherings and celebrations. Peder Severin Krøyer (1851–1909), who was born in Stavanger, Norway, but brought up in Copenhagen, first arrived in Skagen in 1882 and returned almost every summer, finally settling there after marrying Marie Triepcke in 1889. He had already gained a reputation for his paintings of the fishermen in Hornbæk on the north coast of Zealand and had been influenced by the Impressionist movement in his travels to France. In Skagen, he became one of the central and most enthusiastic members of the group of painters, creating masterpieces emphasizing the special effects of the local light in his beach scenes while painting several memorable works recording the lively gatherings of the artists.

== Painting description ==
The painting depicts many of the members of the artists' colony as well as local inhabitants gathered around the traditional midsummer bonfire, celebrated in Denmark on Sankt Hans aften. The artists and the influential personalities from the village are on the left while the rest of the inhabitants are on the right. Krøyer originally made a sketch of the event in 1892 but it took him 14 years to complete the large painting which measures 149.5 centimetres (58.9 in) x 257 centimetres (101 in).

In her Northern Lights, Lise Svanholm tells us Krøyer took his easel onto the beach at Skagen Østerby in 1903 and spent a couple of hours making an extensive sketch. In the foreground, Krøyer's daughter Vibeke stands in front of Marie Krøyer's brother, Valdemar Triepcke, next to Walter Schwartz, the mayor's son. Otto and Alba Schwartz come next, then Michael Ancher in his straw hat beside Degn Brøndum, the innkeeper. In the next row is Brøndum's daughter, Anna Ancher in a green shawl, Henry Brodersen, then the treasurer's wife and, at the end of the row, Schrøder, the postmaster with his little wife Soffi. In addition to the painters, the work includes the writer Holger Drachmann, the head of the lifeboat service, Captain P.K. Nielsen, and the town's treasurer, Brodersen, with his sister in law, Mrs Dethlef Jürgensen, on his arm. On the right-hand side, the artist Laurits Tuxen can be seen with Frederikke who is looking up wondrously at her husband. Tuxen is sketching the scene, resulting in a work which can be seen in Skagens Museum (Krøyer Painting the Midsummer Bonfire, 1906). The red and orange flames are blowing over towards Hugo Alfvén, with Marie on his arm, leaning on a fishing boat.

== Assessment ==
The painting is one of the most important in the collection at Skagens Museum, although Krøyer himself felt the work was too dark, especially the sky which should have been brighter. He recognized it was not one of his best works but believed it would have considerable historic importance. On signing the painting, however, his daughter Vibeke remembers a celebration which reached such heights that Drachmann threw his glass down on the floor. Apparently Krøyer replied: "I find, Drachmann, you should think twice before flinging other people's glasses on the floor. It was not your fault it didn't break."

Nevertheless, the painting is now generally accepted as one of the most important works by the Skagen Painters. Writing in Kristeligt Dagblad, Morten Rasmussen reports that the work is considered by many to be Krøyer's "Magnum Opus", representing a reflection of his own life and a tribute to the people who contributed to his success.

== In popular culture ==
A grayscale version of the painting is featured on the album cover of Chanel Beads' 2024 album Your Day Will Come.

== See also ==
- List of paintings by Peder Severin Krøyer
