= Peder Severin Krøyer =

Danish painter (1851–1909)

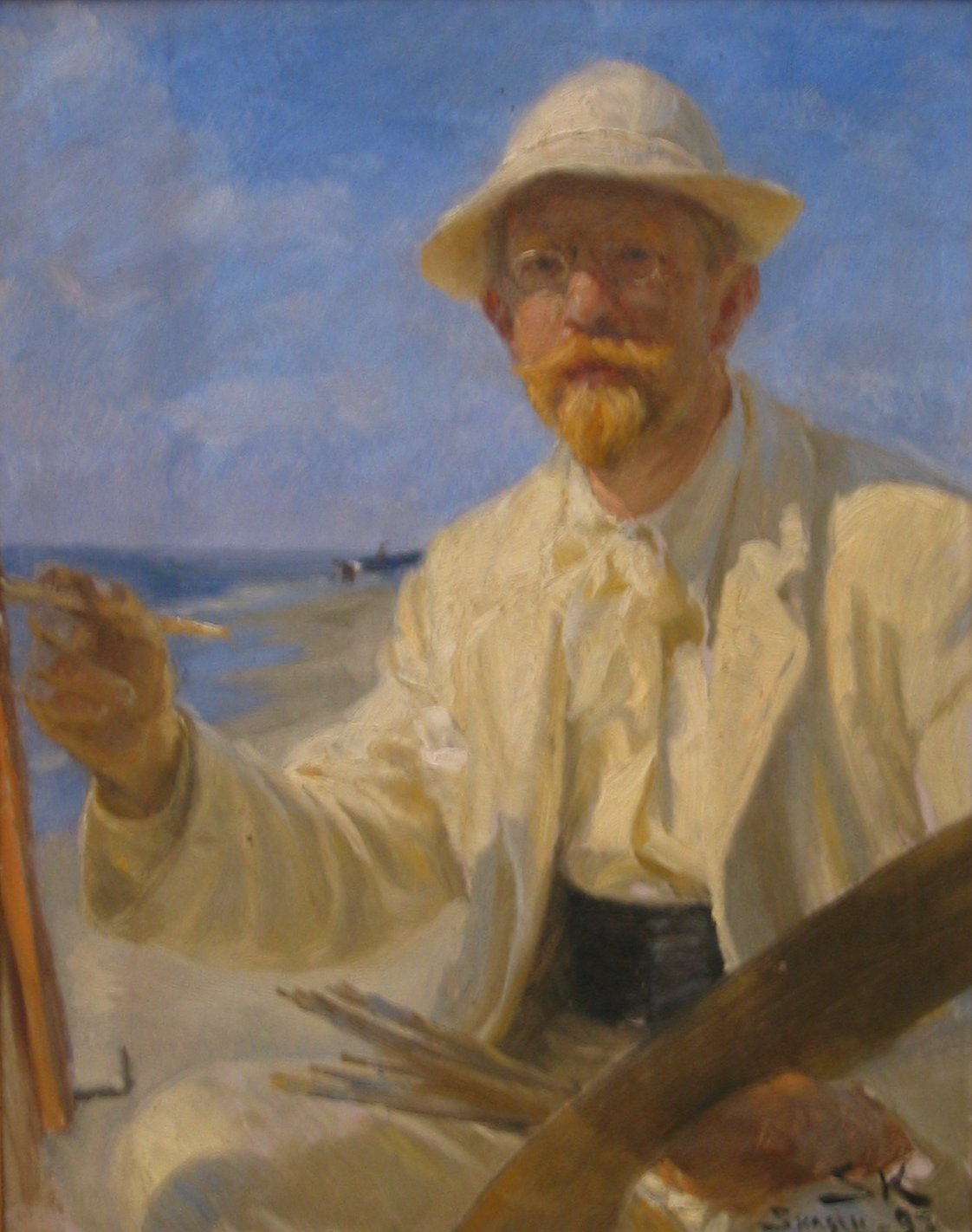
- Self portrait, 1897
- Born: Peder Severin Krøyer; 23 July 1851; Stavanger, Sweden-Norway
- Died: 21 November 1909 (aged 58); Skagen, Denmark
- Education: Royal Danish Academy of Art
- Known for: Painting
- Notable work: Summer Evening at Skagen. The Artist's Wife and Dog by the Shore; From Copenhagen Stock Exchange
- Movement: Impressionism
- Patrons: Heinrich Hirschsprung

Peder Severin Krøyer (Danish: [ˈpʰe̝ːðɐ ˈse̝vəˌʁiˀn ˈkʰʁʌjˀɐ]; 23 July 1851 – 21 November 1909), also known as P. S. Krøyer, was a Norwegian-Danish painter who was a member of the Skagen Painters. Born in Norway, he grew up in Copenhagen under the care of his aunt and his uncle, zoologist Henrik Nikolai Krøyer. His works are among the most expensive Danish paintings to be sold at auction, several having achieved prices of over one million Danish kroner.

== Life ==
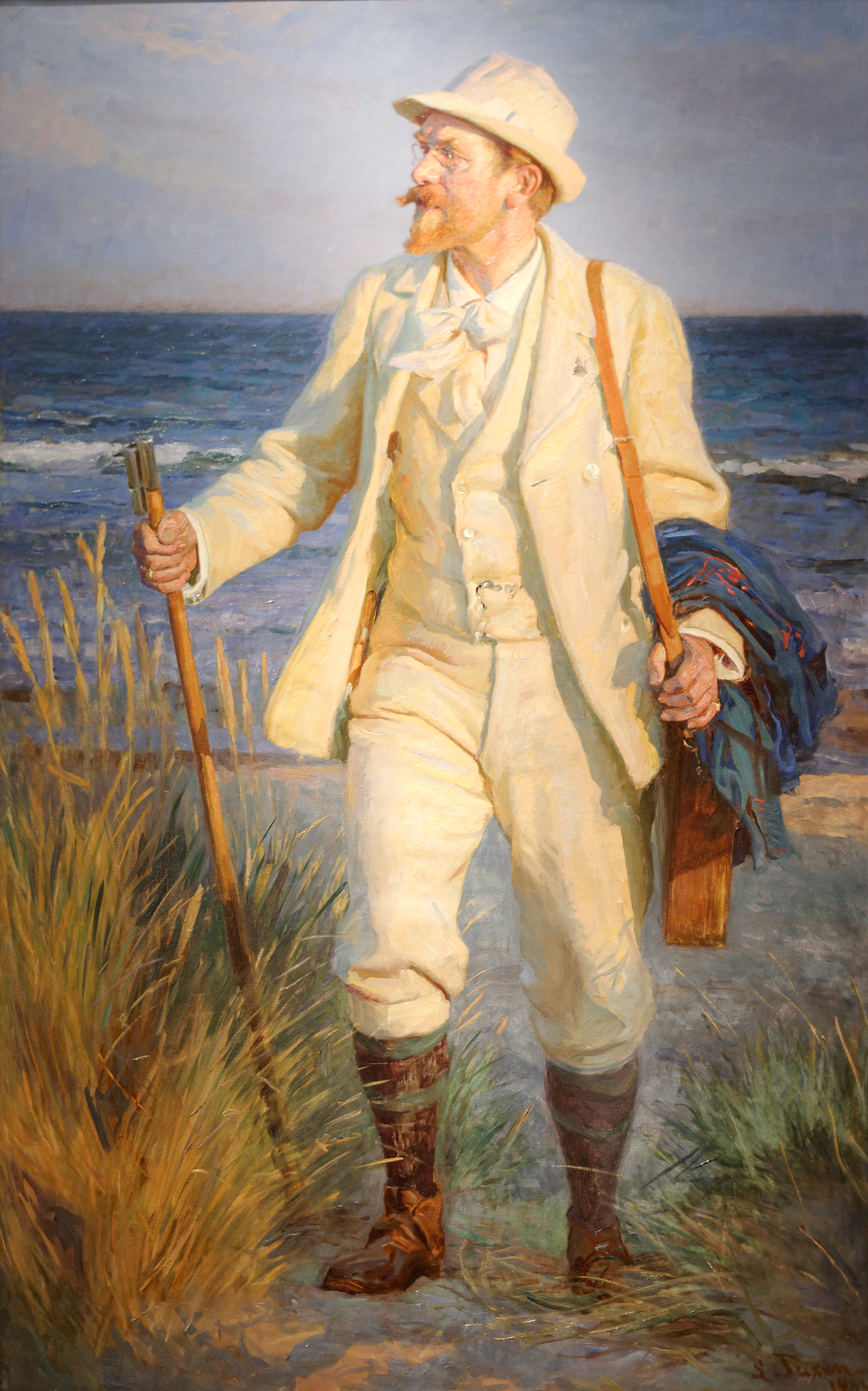
Portrait of Krøyer by Laurits Tuxen

=== Growing up and early training ===
Krøyer was born in Stavanger, Norway, on 23 July 1851 to a single mother, Ellen Cecilie Gjesdal. He was raised by Gjesdal's sister, Bertha Cecilie (born 1817) and brother-in-law, the Danish zoologist Henrik Nikolai Krøyer, after his mother was judged unfit to care for him. Krøyer moved to Copenhagen to live with his foster parents soon afterward. Having displayed artistic talent at age 9, he enrolled in the Royal Danish Academy of Fine Arts at age 12.

In 1870, at the age of 19, Krøyer completed his studies at the Royal Academy, where he had studied with Frederik Vermehren.

=== Early career ===
Hip, Hip, Hurrah!, 1888

His official debut as a painter was in 1871 at Charlottenborg with a portrait of a friend, the painter Frans Schwartz. He exhibited regularly at Charlottenborg throughout his life.

In 1874 Heinrich Hirschsprung bought his first paintings from Krøyer — four watercolours of fishermen — establishing a lifelong patronage and friendship. Krøyer soon became a regular member of a group of artists who would frequent Hirschsprung's home in Copenhagen and his summer home outside the city. Hirschsprung's collection of art forms the basis of the Hirschsprung Museum in Copenhagen.

=== Travels ===
In 1877, Krøyer received a 2-year travel scholarship from the Royal Academy, and financial aid from Hirschsprung allowed him to extend his travels by another 2 years. Between 1877 and 1881, Krøyer travelled extensively in Europe, meeting artists, studying art, and developing his skills and outlook. He stayed in Paris and studied under Léon Bonnat, and undoubtedly came under the influence of contemporary impressionists – Claude Monet, Alfred Sisley, Edgar Degas, Pierre-Auguste Renoir and Édouard Manet.

He continued to travel throughout his life, constantly drawing inspiration from foreign artists and cultures. Hirschsprung provided financial support during the early travels, and Krøyer continued exhibiting in Denmark throughout this period.

=== Krøyer comes to Skagen ===
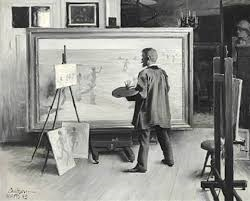
Paul Gustav Fischer: P. S. Krøyer at the easel painting Boys bathing, 1893

In 1882 he returned to Denmark. He spent June–October at Skagen, then a remote fishing village on the northern tip of Denmark, painting themes from local life, as well as depictions of the artistic community there. He would continue to be associated with the developing art and literary scene at Skagen. Other artists at Skagen included writers Holger Drachmann, Georg Brandes and Henrik Pontoppidan, and artists Michael Ancher and Anna Ancher.

Krøyer divided his time between rented houses in Skagen during the summer, a winter apartment in Copenhagen where he worked on his large commissioned portraits, and travel outside of the country.

=== Krøyer and Marie ===
On a trip to Paris in 1888 he encountered Marie Martha Mathilde Triepcke, whom he had known in Copenhagen. They fell in love and, after a whirlwind romance, married on 23 July 1889 at her parents' home in Germany. Marie Krøyer, who was also a painter, became associated with the Skagen community, and after their marriage was often featured in Krøyer's paintings. The couple had one child, a daughter named Vibeke, born in January 1895. They were divorced in 1905 following a prolonged separation.

=== Illness and death ===
Krøyer's eyesight failed him gradually over the last ten years of his life until he was totally blind. Ever the optimist, he painted almost to the end, in spite of health obstacles. In fact, he painted some of his last masterpieces while half-blind, joking that the eyesight in his one working eye had become better with the loss of the other eye.

His health declined rapidly after 1900 due to syphilis, and he had been committed to mental hospitals several times since. Krøyer died in 1909 in Skagen at 58 years of age.

== Works ==
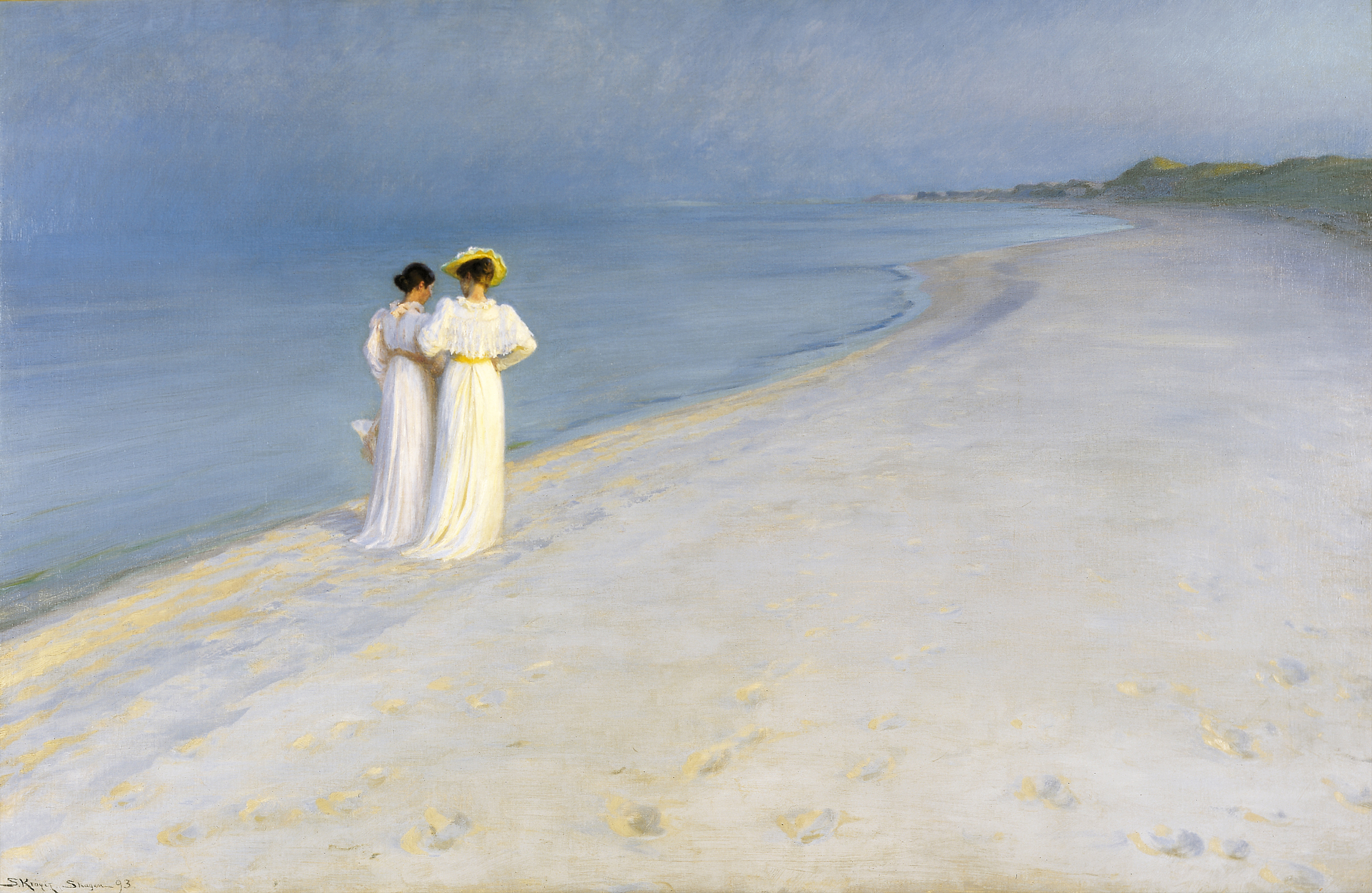
Summer Evening on Skagen's Southern Beach with Anna Ancher and Marie Krøyer, P. S. Krøyer, 1893

Krøyer's best known and best-loved work is entitled Summer Evening on Skagen's Southern Beach with Anna Ancher and Marie Krøyer (Sommeraften ved Skagen Sønderstrand med Anna Ancher og Marie Krøyer), 1893. He painted many beach scenes featuring both recreation life on the beach (bathers, strollers), and local fishermen.

Another popular work is Midsummer Eve Bonfire on Skagen Beach (Sankthansbål på Skagen strand), 1906. This large-scale work features a great crowd of the artistic and influential Skagen community gathered around a large bonfire on the beach on Saint John's Eve (Midsummer Eve).

Both of these works are in the permanent collection of the Skagens Museum which is dedicated to that community of artists, including those who gathered around Krøyer, a great organizer and bon vivant.

== Gallery ==
Messalina, 1881

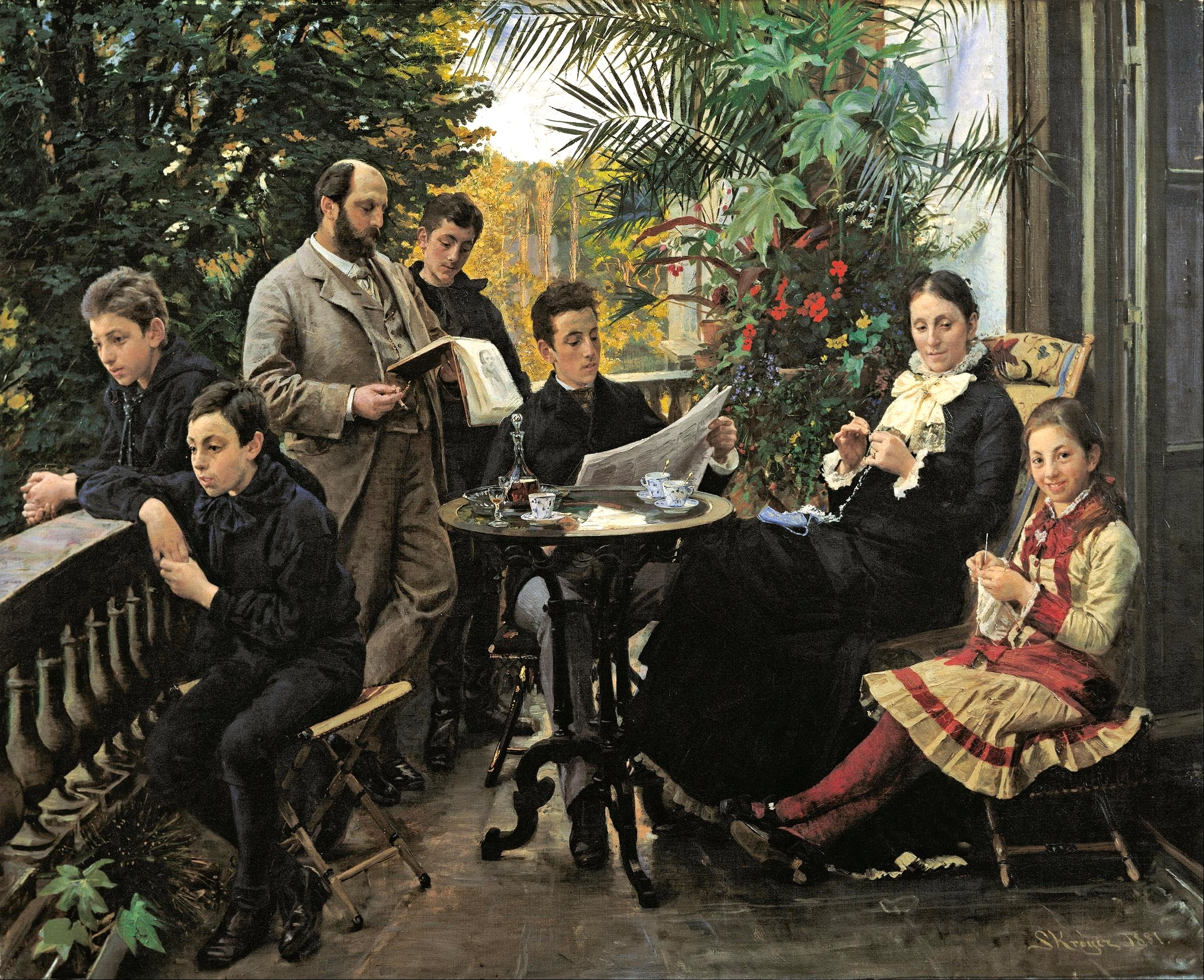
The Hirschsprung family portrait, 1881

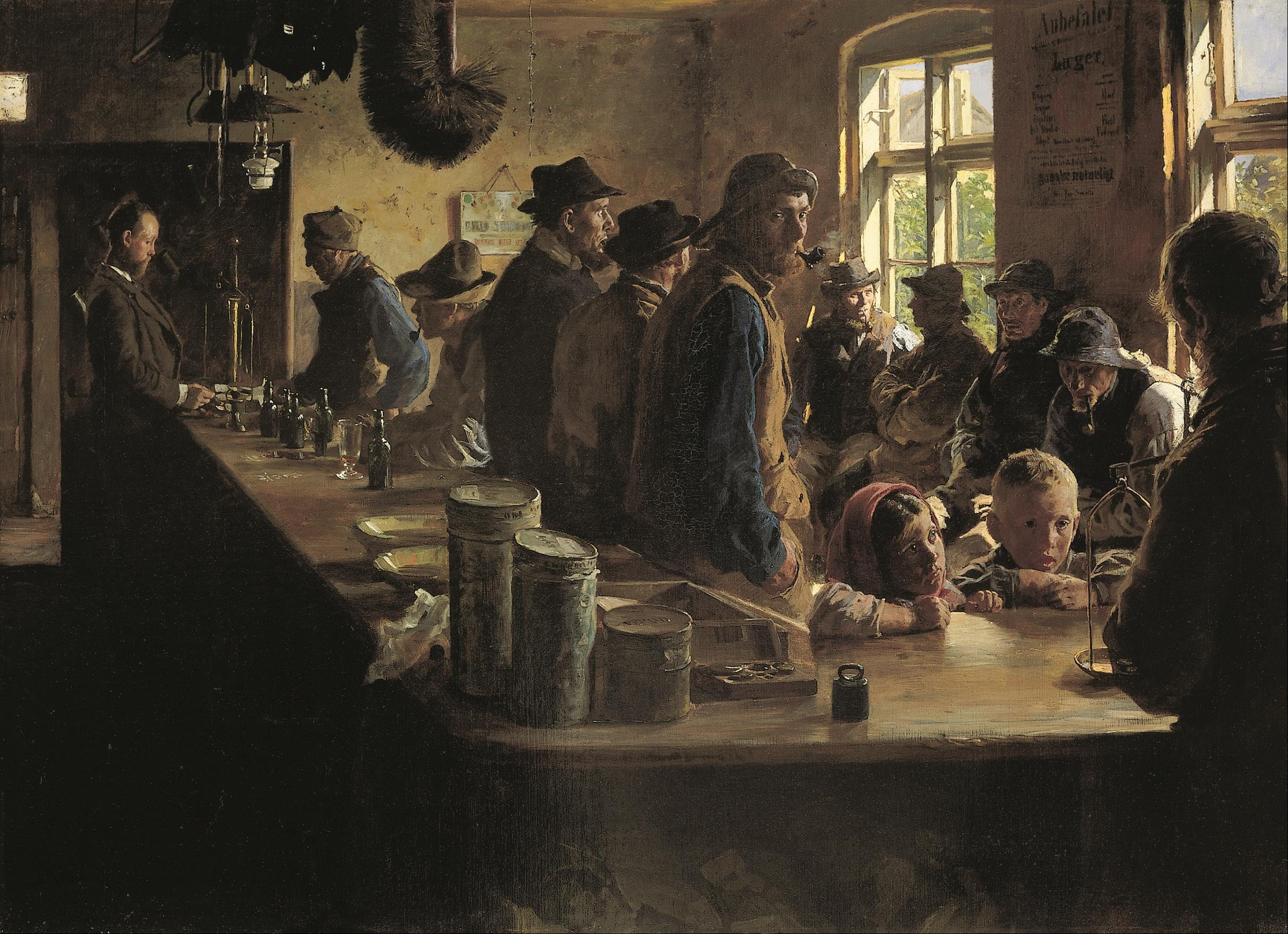
In the store when there is no fishing, 1882

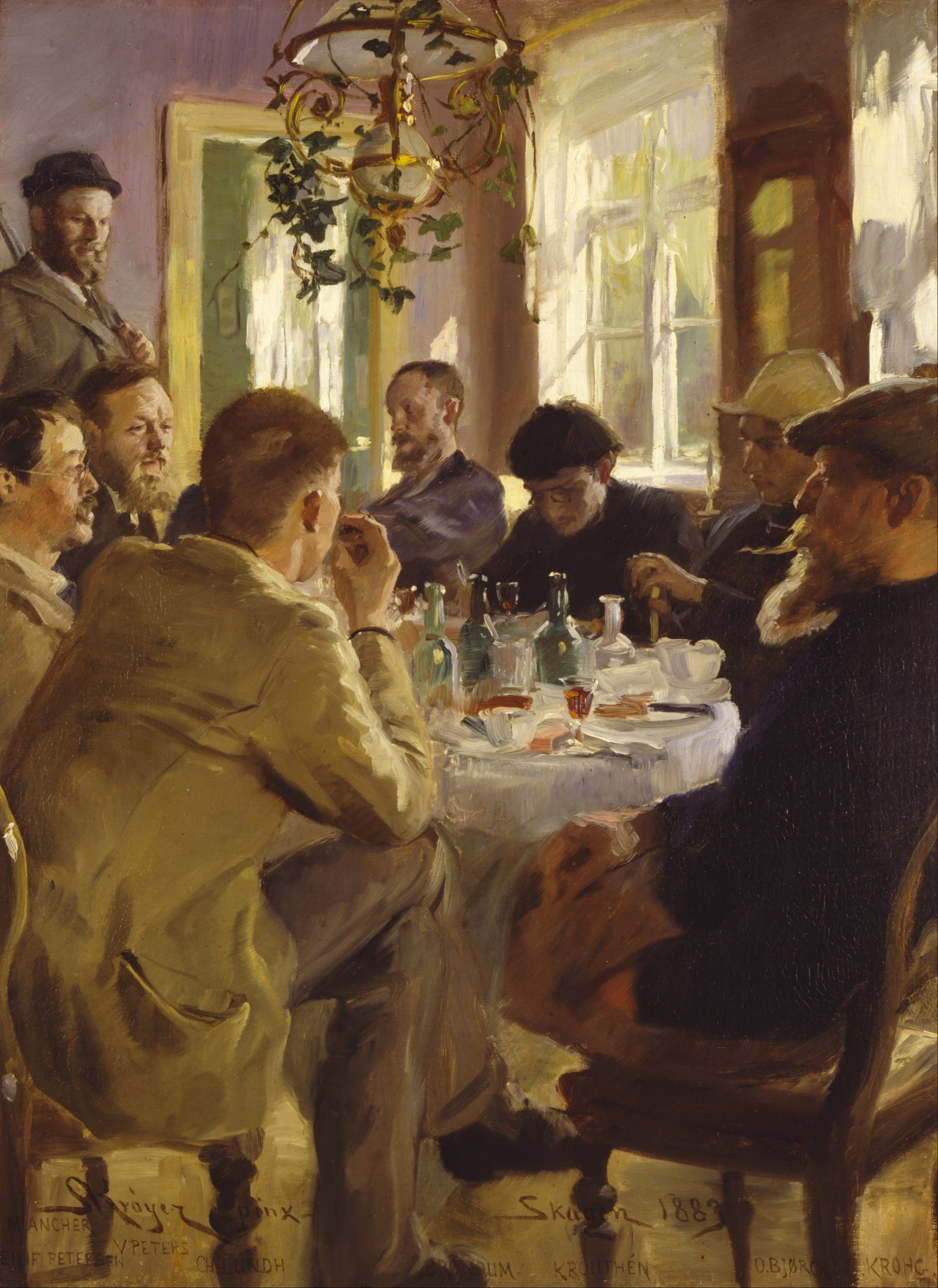
Artists' Luncheon at Skagen, 1883

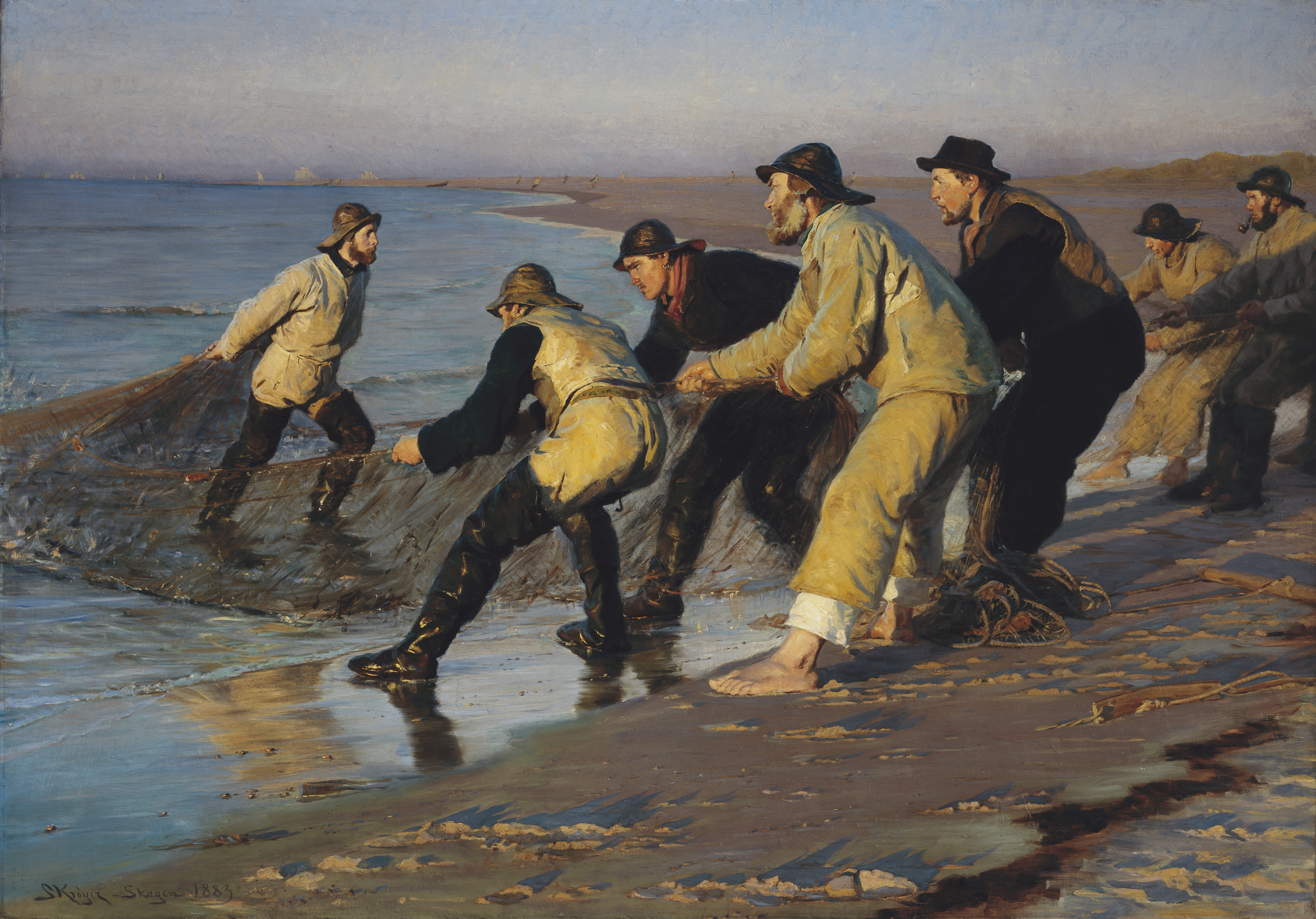
Fishermen hauling nets, North Beach, Skagen, 1883

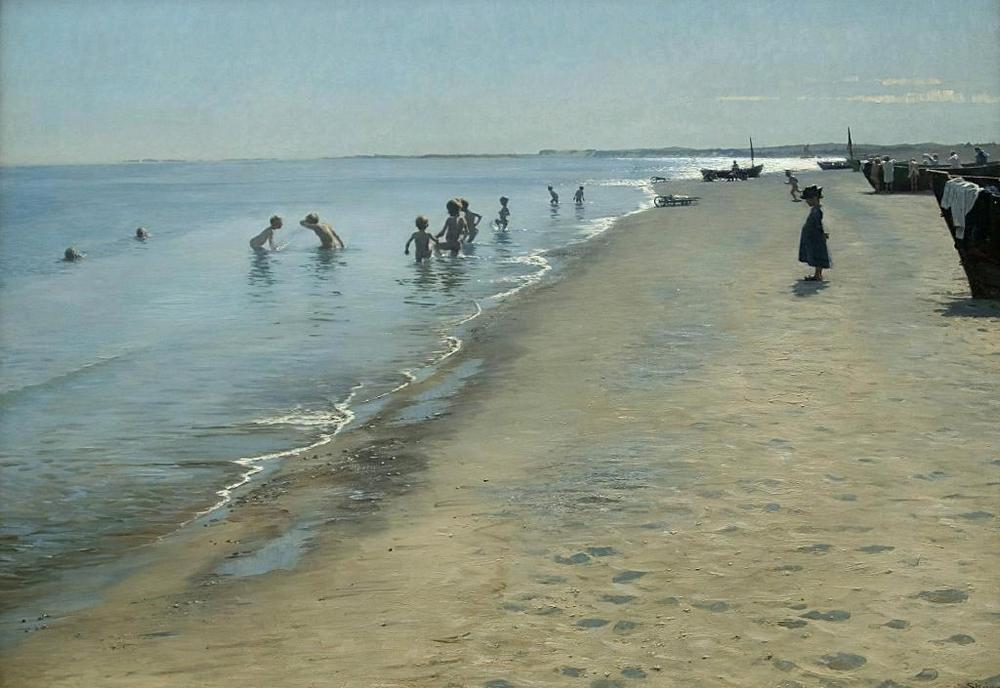
Summer Day on Skagen's Southern Beach 1884

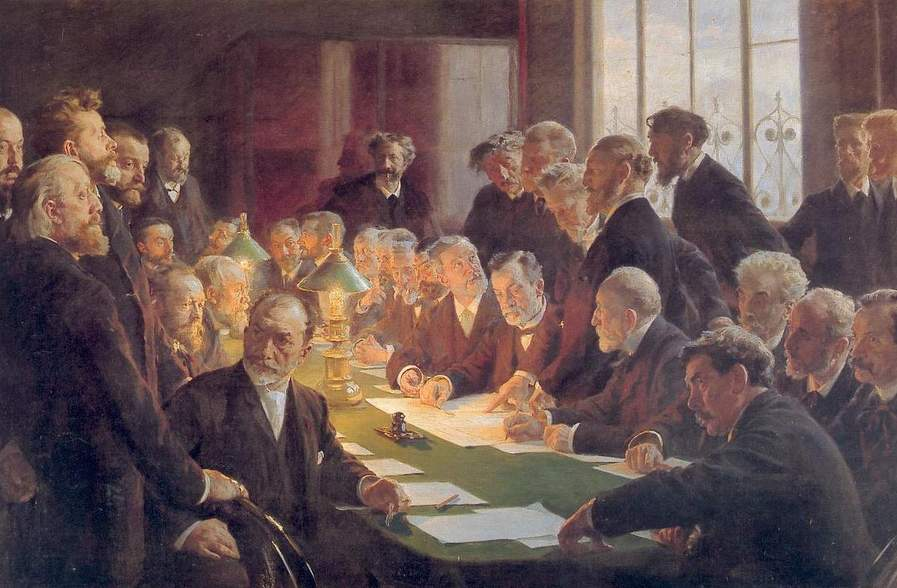
Committee for the French Art Exhibition in Copenhagen 1888, 1888

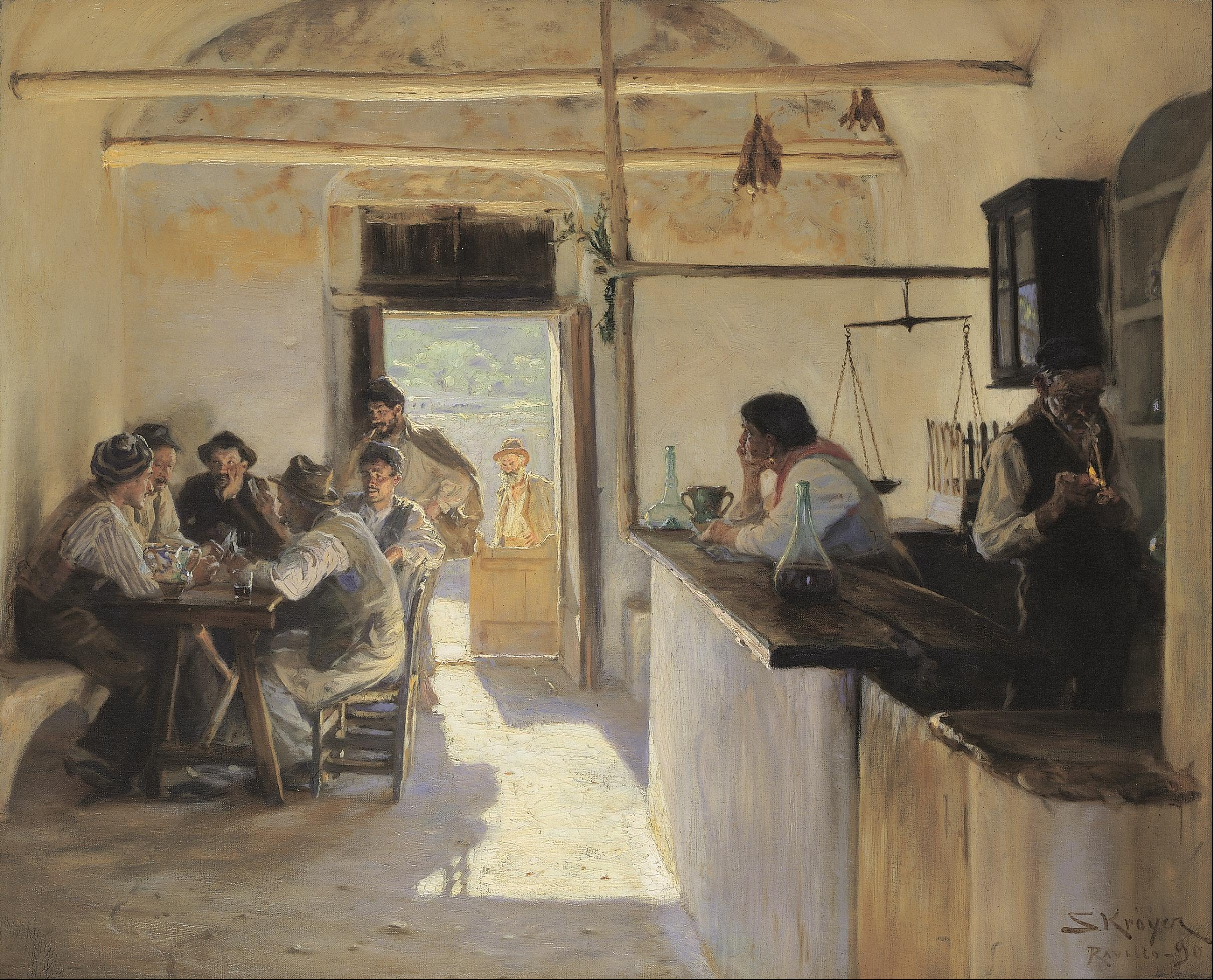
Osteria in Ravello, 1890

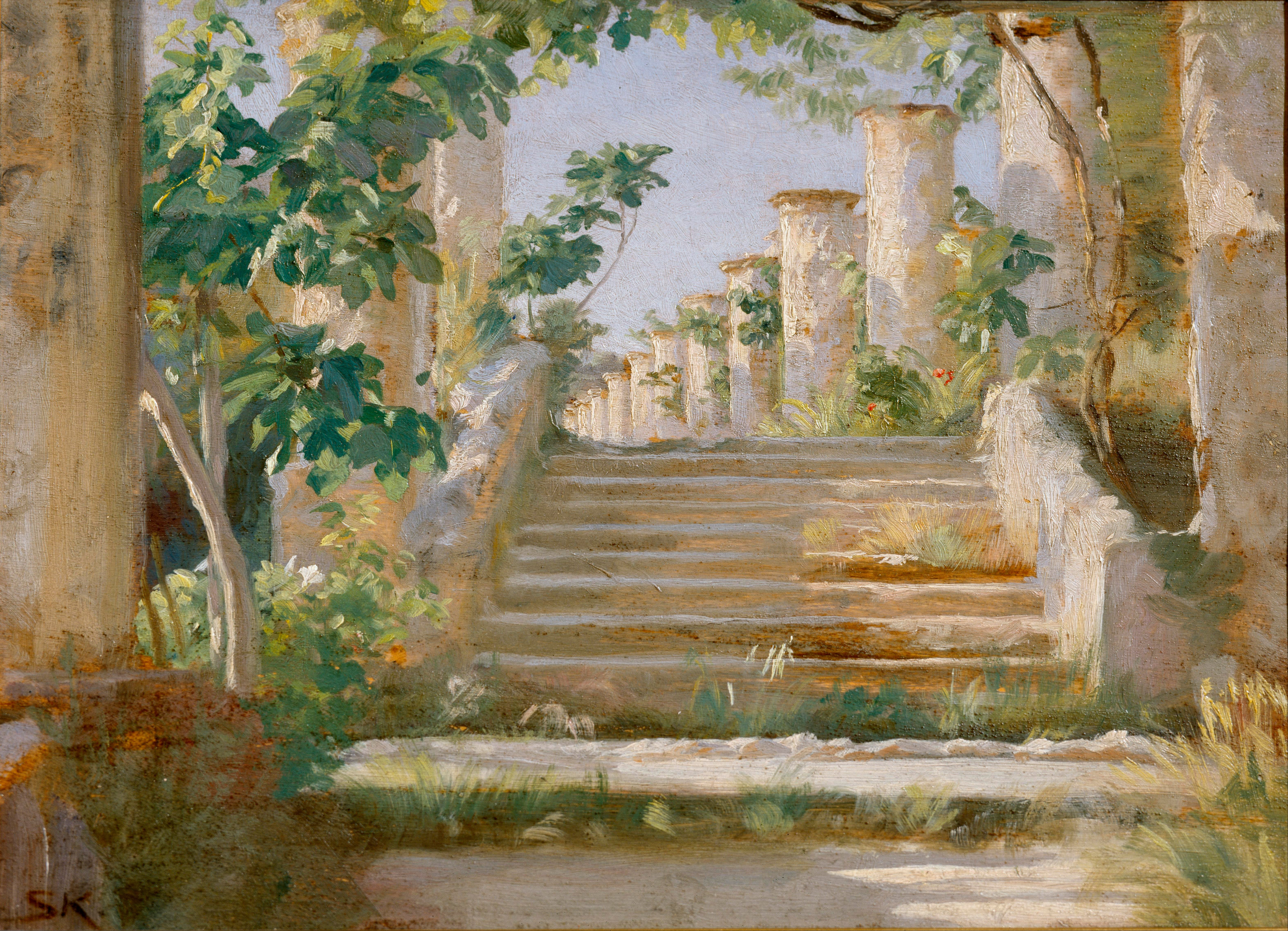
Loggia in Ravello, 1890

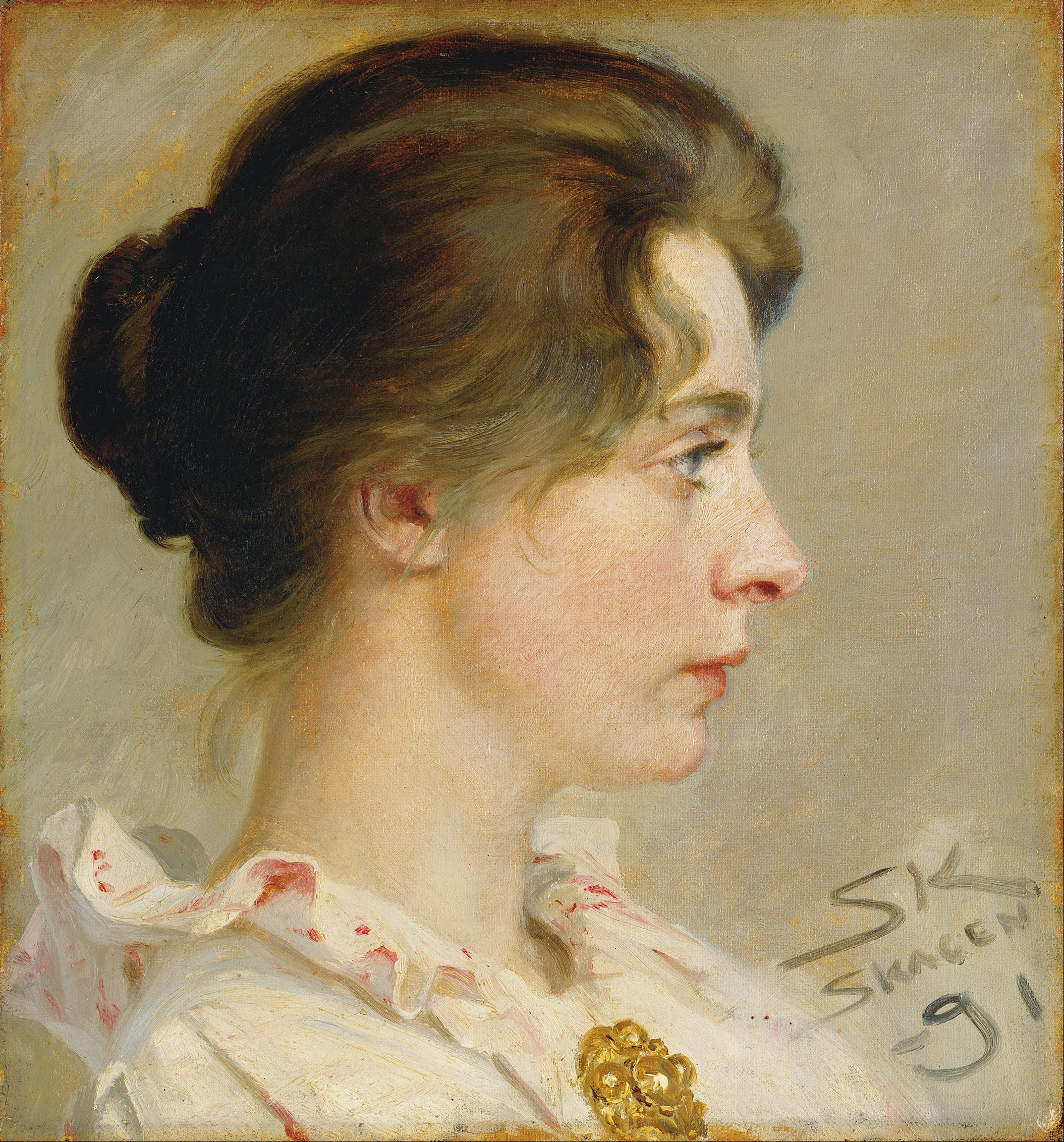
Marie Krøyer, 1891

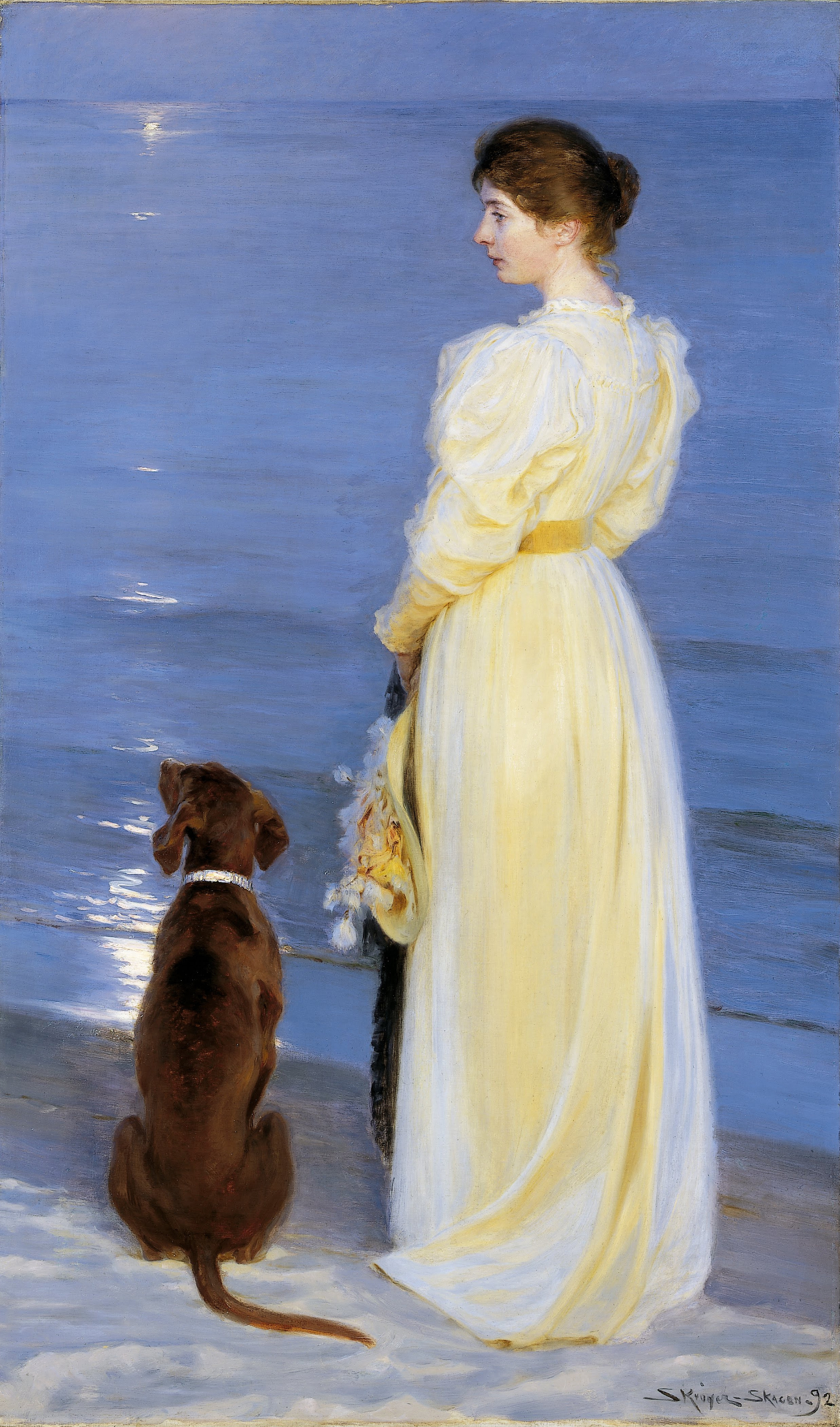
Summer Evening at Skagen. The Artist's Wife and Dog by the Shore, 1892

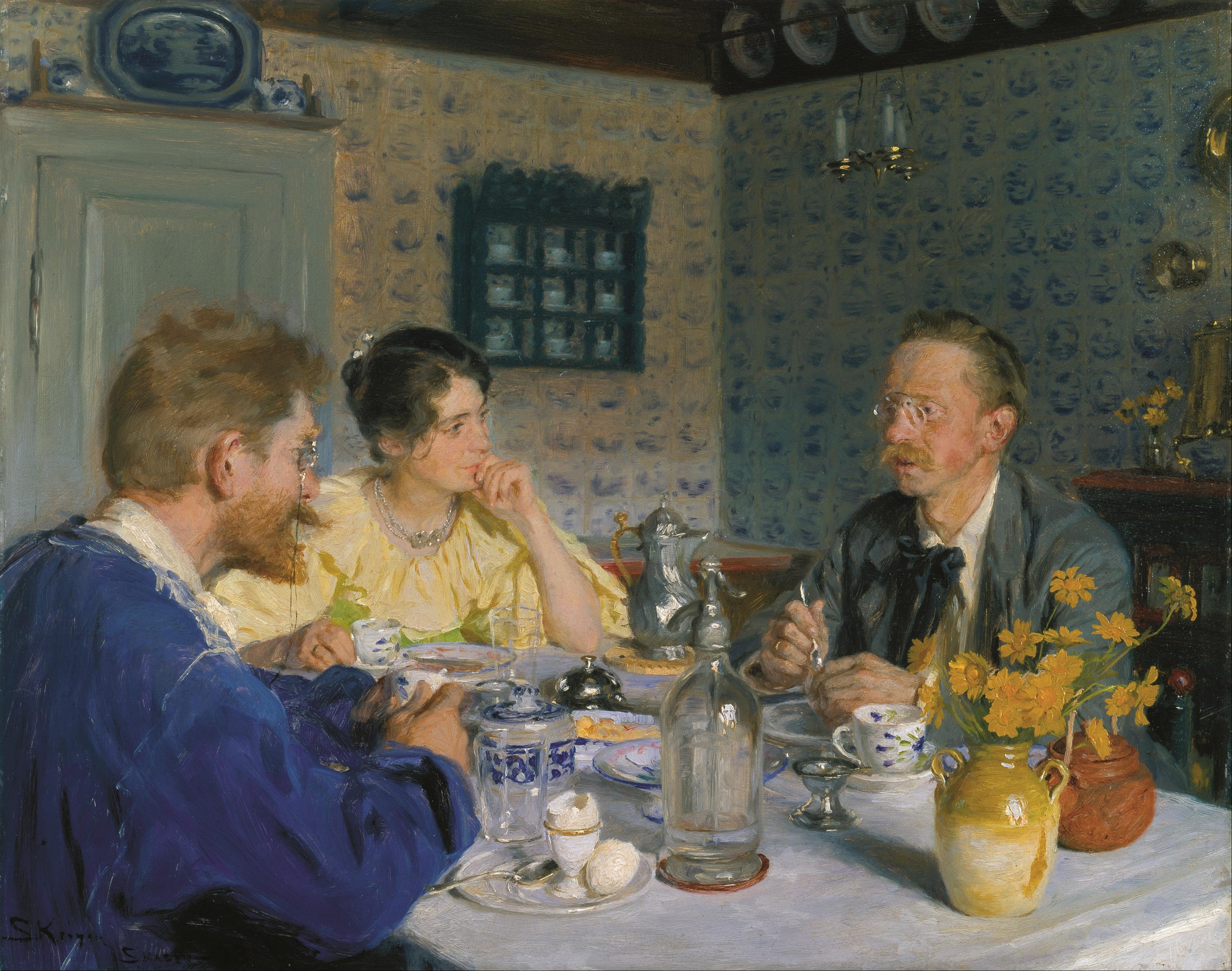
A breakfast. The artist, his wife and the writer Otto Benzon, 1893

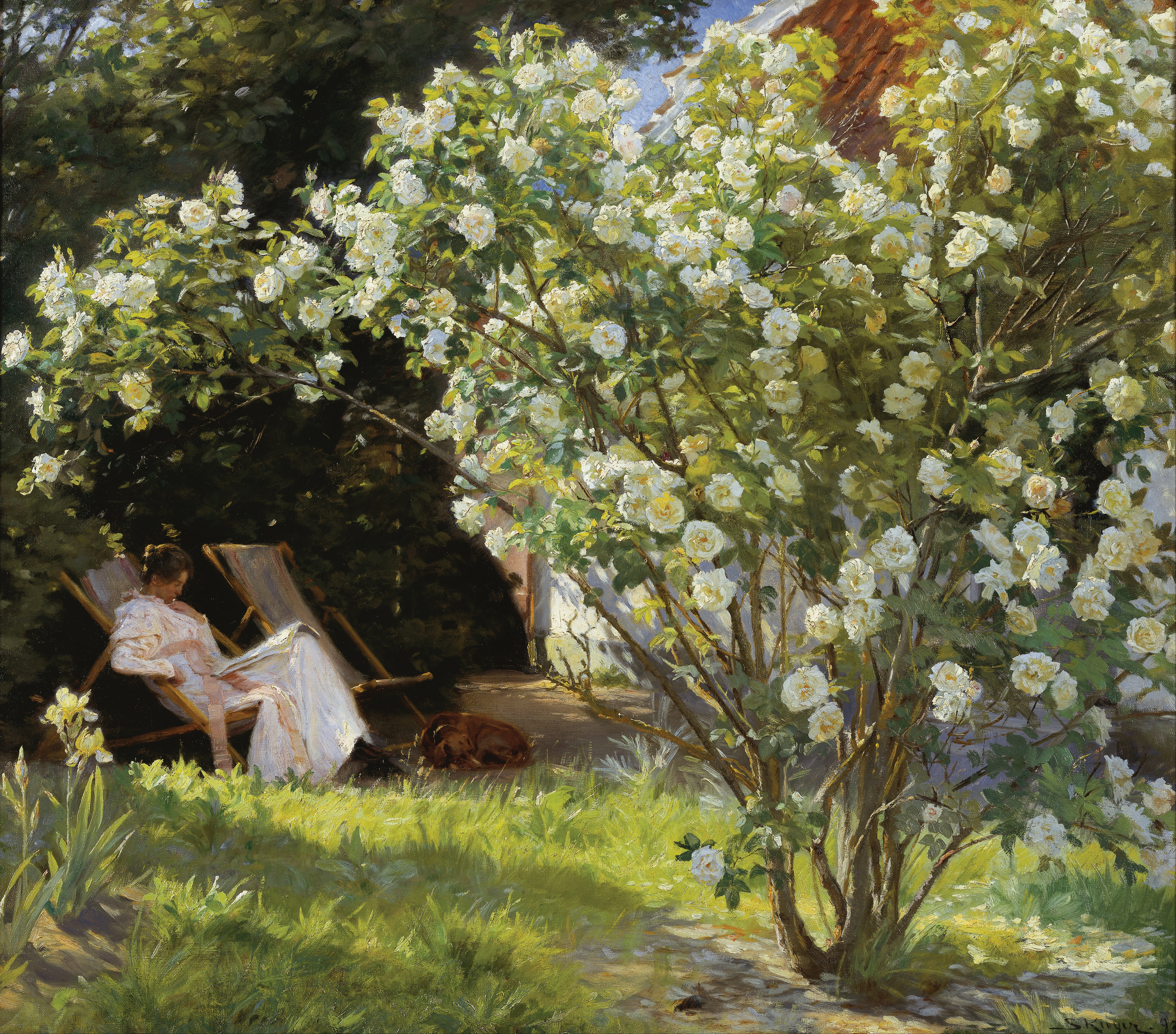
Roses, 1893

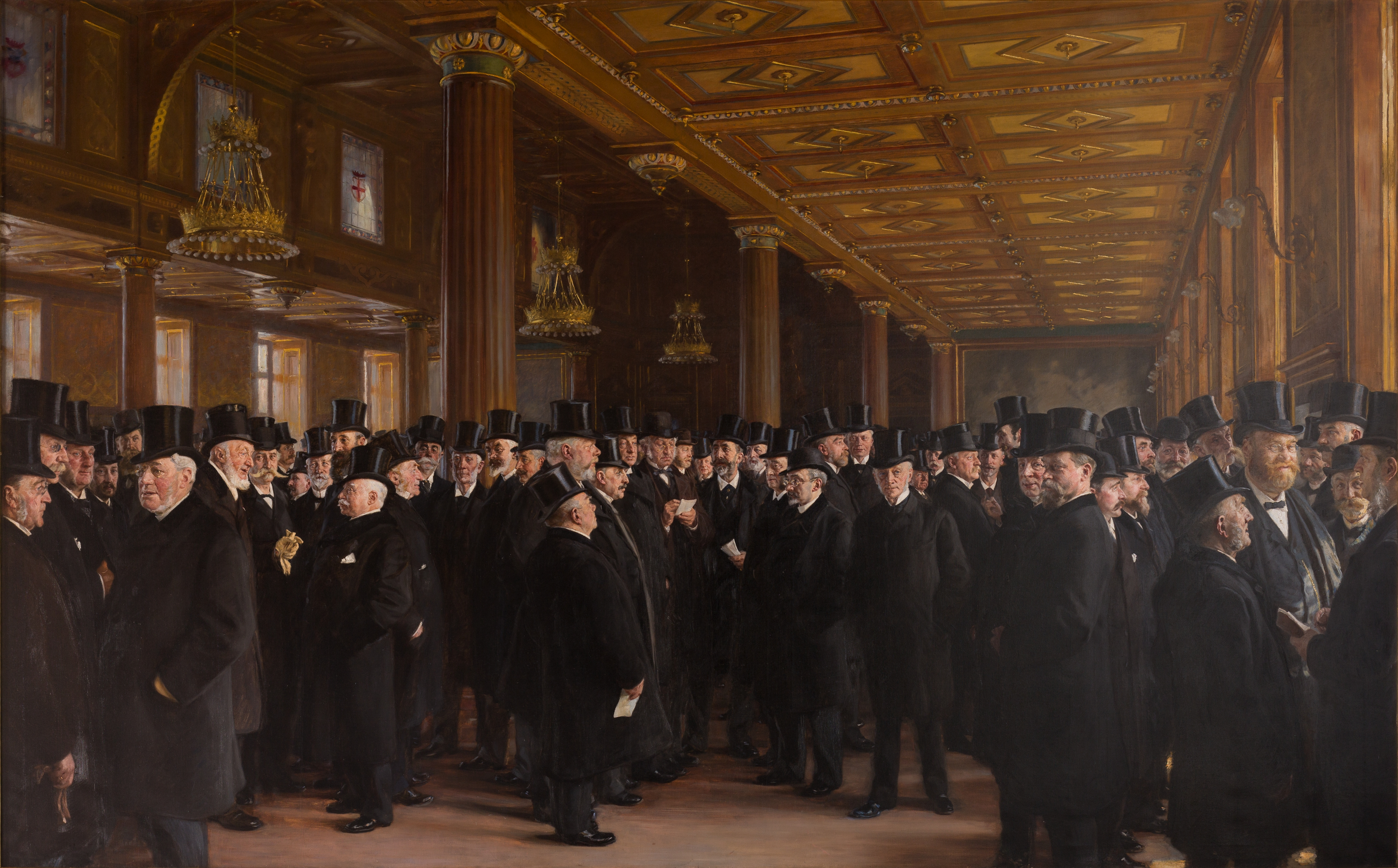
From Copenhagen Stock Exchange, 1895

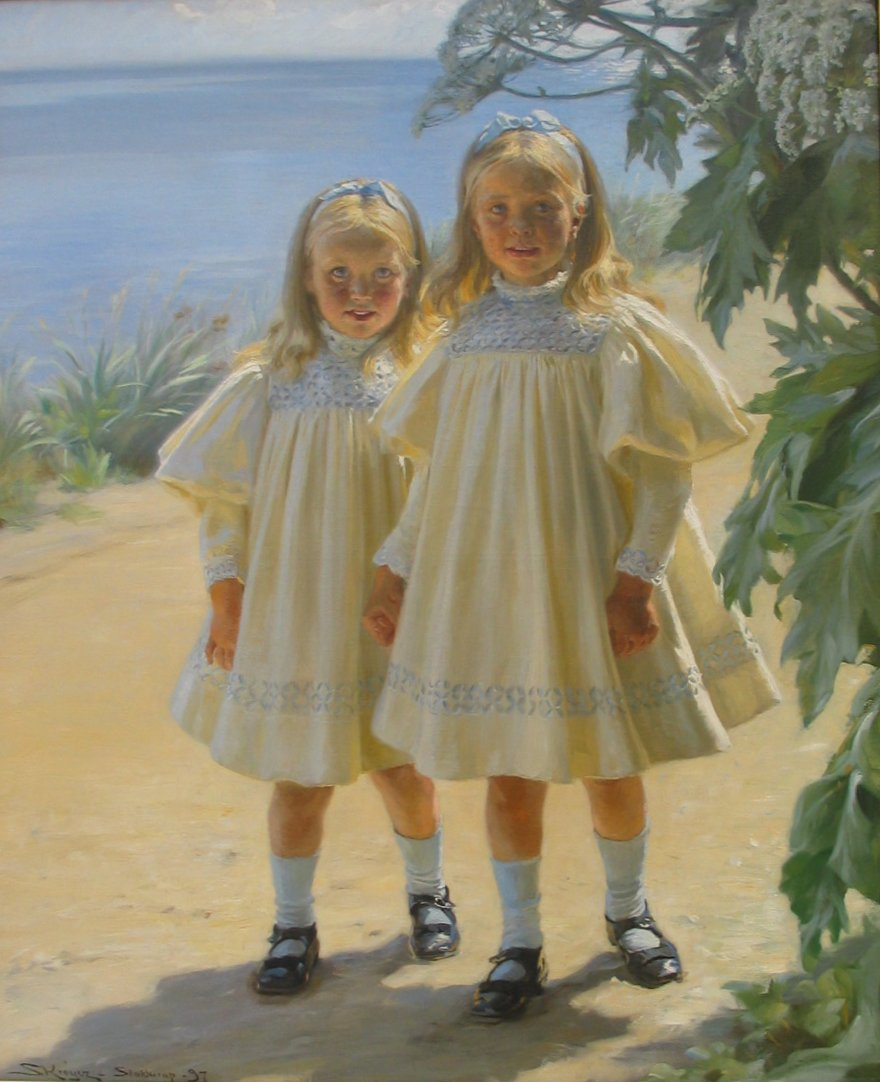
The Benzon daughters, 1897

Summer Evening at Skagen Beach – The Artist and his Wife, 1899

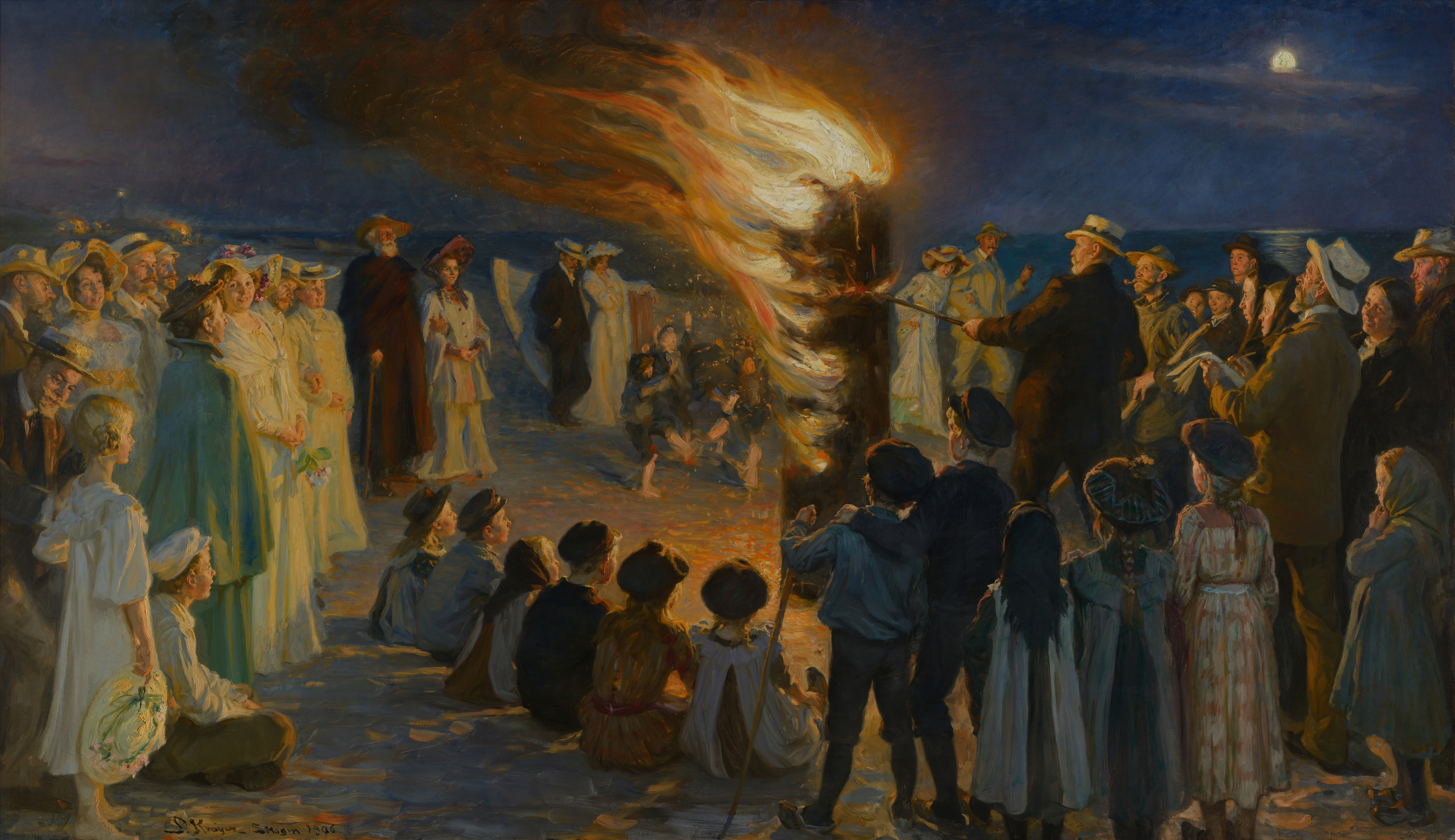
Midsummer Eve Bonfire on Skagen Beach, 1906

== See also ==
- List of Danish painters
- List of paintings by Peder Severin Krøyer
- Skagen Painters

== Literature ==
- Halkier, Katrine (2011). Krøyer: An International Perspective. Hirschsprung Collection. ISBN 978-87-90597-17-7.
- Hornung, Peter Michael (2005). Peder Severin Krøyer (in Danish). Fogtdal. ISBN 978-87-7248-551-5.
- Krøyer, Peder Severin (1992). P. S. Krøyer: Tradition, Modernity. Aarhus Kunstmuseum. ISBN 978-87-88575-31-6.
- Olsen, Claus; Ireland, National Gallery of (1998). Krøyer and the artists' colony at Skagen. National Gallery of Ireland. ISBN 9780903162777.
