= The Hirschsprung family portrait =

1881 painting by Peder Severin Krøyer

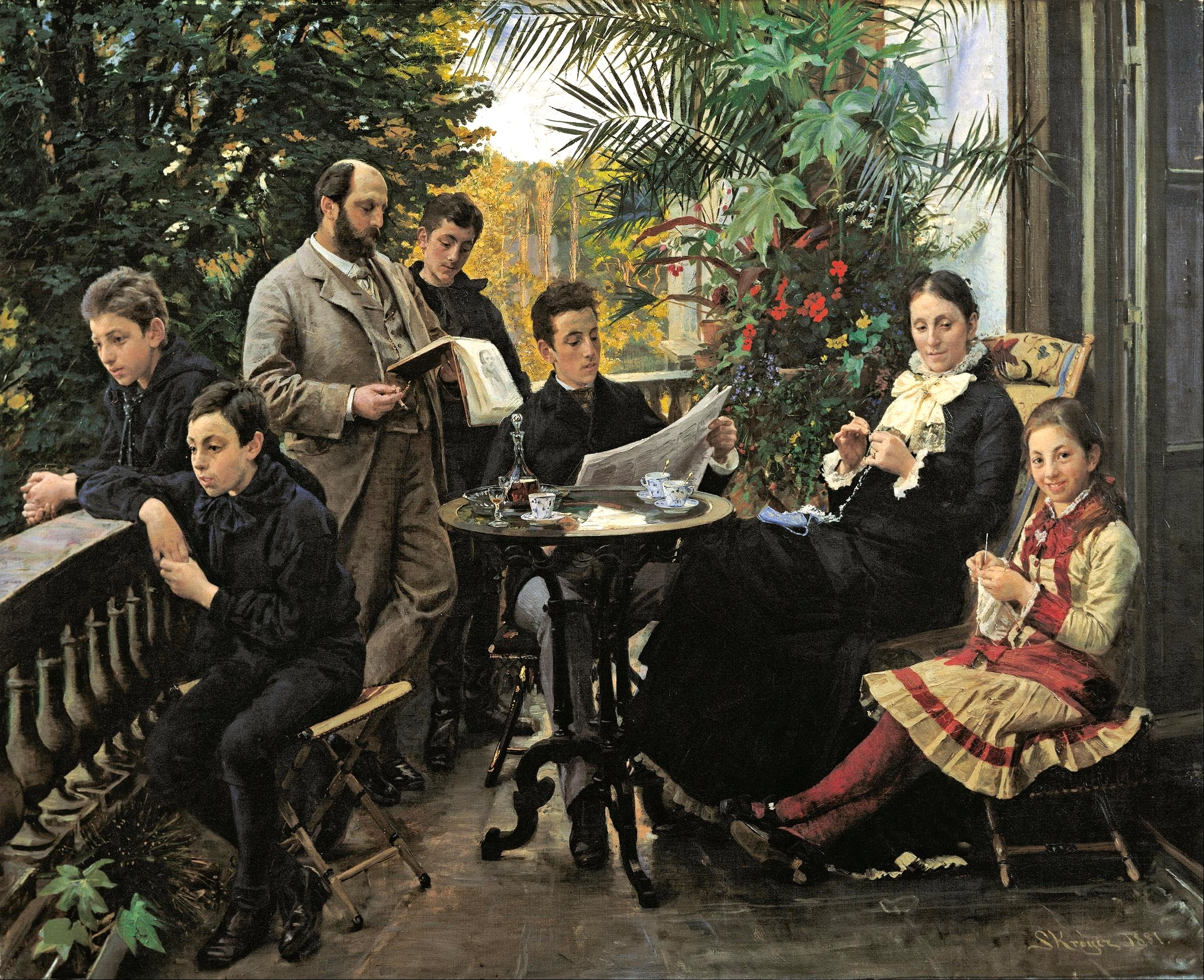
- Artist: Peder Severin Krøyer
- Year: 1881
- Medium: Oil on canvas
- Movement: Realism
- Dimensions: 109.5 cm × 135 cm (43.1 in × 53 in)
- Location: Hirschsprung Collection; Copenhagen

The Hirschsprung family portrait (Danish: Det Hirschsprungske familiebillede) is an 1881 painting by Peder Severin Krøyer. It shows the family of the Danish cigar manufacturer Heinrich Hirschsprung on the balcony of their summer house. It is painted in a realist style (Note: Krøyer switched to an impressionistic style shortly after.) which was dominant in Denmark at the time. The work is part of the Hirschsprung Collection in Copenhagen.

== Background ==
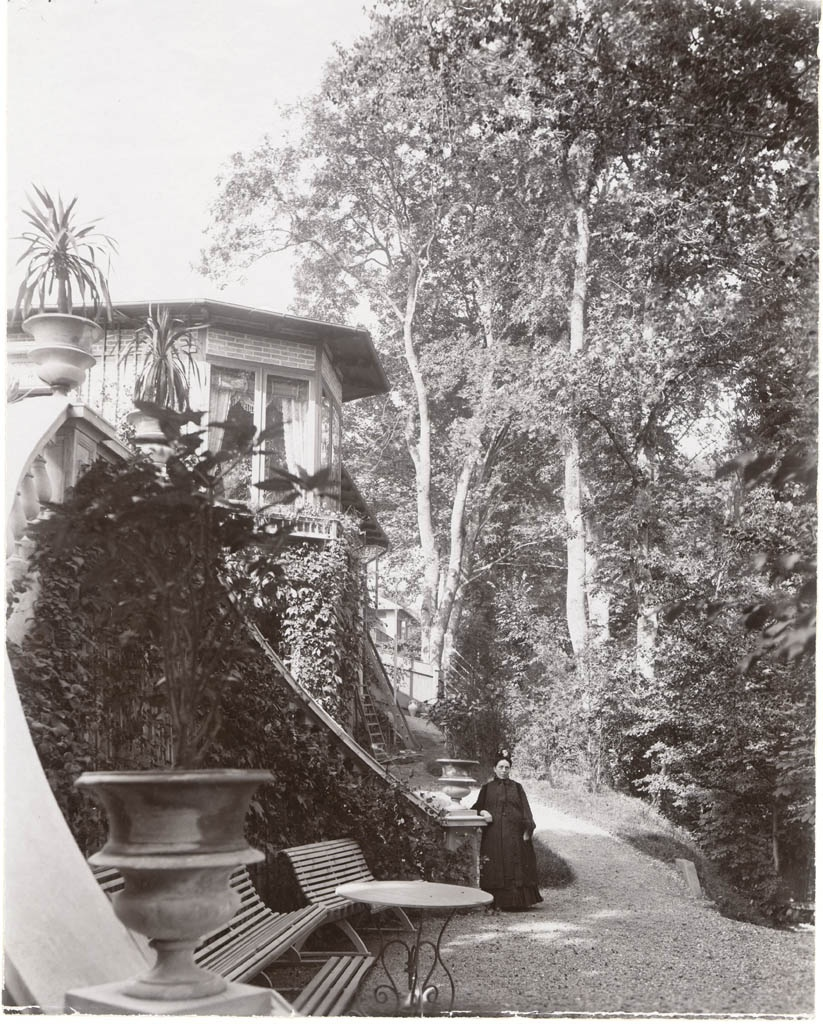
Hirschsprung's summer house 'Skraenten' in Skodsborg, with the Italian steps

Heinrich Hirschsprung (1836–1908) was the son of a tobacconist of German-Jewish descent. Together with his brother Bernhard he took over A.M. Hirschsprung & Sønner in 1858. In 1866, he built a modern cigar factory with which he amassed a fortune.

Hirschsprung was a great art lover and would eventually become an avid art collector as well. (Note: Hirschsprung would eventually build a collection of no fewer than 700 works, mainly from the Danish Golden Age and by the Skagen Painters, which he donated to the Danish state in 1902. After his death, his collection became the basis for a new museum, the Hirschsprung Collection.) He was impressed by Krøyer's talent early on in his career and so Hirschsprung decided to support Krøyer by purchasing his work and financing his travels abroad from 1877 to 1881. Krøyer also quickly became an intimate friend of the family, conducting extensive correspondence with Hirschsprung's wife Pauline and portraying various members of the family in his paintings. The Hirschsprung family portrait is an outstanding example of the close relationship between the Hirschsprung family and Krøyer. It was requested by Pauline, Heinrich's wife who wanted a family portrait before her sons went off to boarding school in Switzerland. Krøyer prepared for the painting with sketches and drawings of each individual family member, as well as several composition studies. The painting would remain in the family's possession until Hirschsprung handed over his collection to the Danish state in 1902.

== Painting ==
The Hirschsprung family portrait is painted in a realist style that was dominant in Denmark at the time and is heavily influenced by Édouard Manet, whose work Krøyer had come to know in Paris. The location is most likely the terrace of Hirschsprung's summer house "Skraenten", located in the coastal town of Skodsborg, just north of Copenhagen. (Note: It has been suggested that it could be instead Hirschsprung's summer house "Vilhelmsdal" which was located near the coast of Svanemølle Bay in Copenhagen. This is unlikely though given the wooded background and that old photos of "Skraenten" show clear similarities with the work, for example in the balustrade.) It shows an apparently casual family scene at a quiet moment and evokes a kind of "Sunday feeling".

Krøyer portrays the mutual relationships between the family members with great psychological insight. The two boys on the left, Ivar and Aage, seem to look dreamily and somewhat bored into the distance: the subject of their attention does not seem particularly captivating. In the middle, Heinrich, the patriarch, and his son Oscar examine a sketchbook. On the right, Pauline looks at her daughter Ellen, who in turn looks at the painter and therefore at the viewer. Both are knitting and sitting close to the door, tied to the house. The only loner is Robert, the eldest, who reads the newspaper in the middle. Despite the division into pairs and despite the limited interaction between the family members, Krøyer still manages to instil a sense of togetherness and seclusion in the work. The depicted individuals belong together, nobody is deliberately ignored, there is clear harmony. On the table are cups of coffee and a bottle of "spirits".

The sense of harmony is emphasized by Krøyer through balanced composition. The pairs, plus Robert reading the newspaper, are represented in the form of ellipses, which are repeated in the round table and part of the balustrade. The balustrade of the imposing Italian staircase and the continuous tiles also give the viewer the feeling of "belonging". This effect is further enhanced by the direct gaze with which Ellen looks the viewer in the eye. With this presentation, Krøyer emphasizes the intimacy of the nuclear family, which is inherent in the concept of 'family' despite traditional male-female roles. The painting is thus a perfect example of the culture and norms of a bourgeois family of the period and harbours an ideal of the happy family. The painting is in a long tradition of depictions of the bourgeois family dating back to the mid-18th century and continued by Jens Juel (The Ryberg Family Portrait, 1797) Martinus Rørbye (The Surgeon Christian Fenger With Wife and Daughter, 1818) and Christoffer Wilhelm Eckersberg (The Nathansen Family Portrait, 1820). The writer Henrik Pontoppidan, a close acquaintance of the family, used Krøyer's family portrait as a model for the Solomon family in his novel Lucky Per, for which he was awarded the Nobel Prize in Literature.

== See also ==
- List of works by Peder Severin Krøyer
