= Hunters of Skagen =

1881 painting by Peder Severin Krøyer

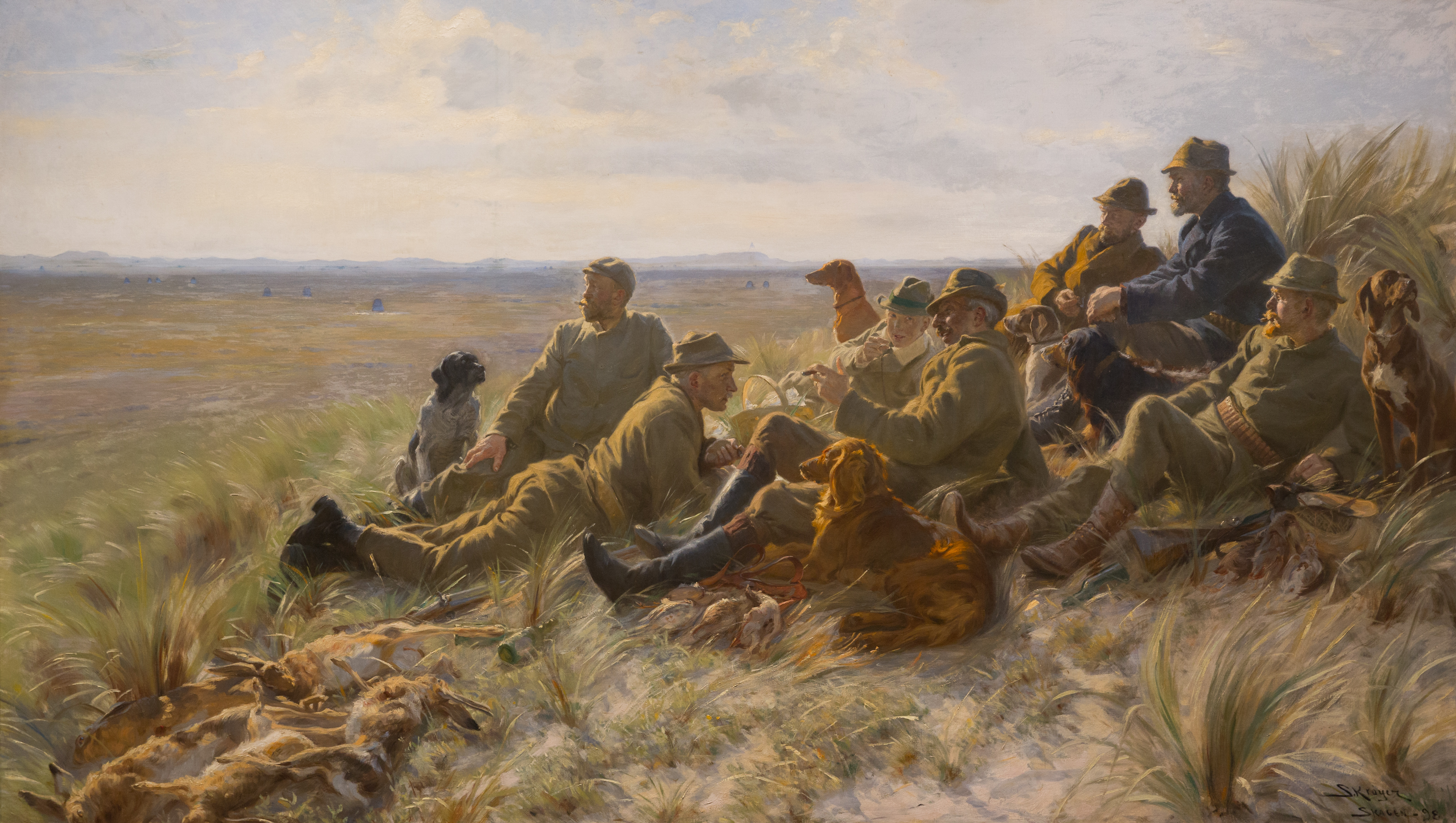
- Artist: Peder Severin Krøyer
- Year: 1898
- Medium: Oil on canvas
- Movement: Realism
- Dimensions: 145.5 cm × 255.5 cm (57.3 in × 100.6 in)
- Location: ARoS Aarhus Kunstmuseum; Aarhus

Hunters of Skagen (Danish: Skagensjægere) is an 1898 painting by artist Peder Severin Krøyer. It depicts a hunt on September 21, 1897. The work was sold to ARoS Aarhus Kunstmuseum in 1899 and has belonged to the museum ever since.

== Painting ==
The painting features a group of hunters resting on a dune slope after a successful hunt. The hunters are lying and sitting down resting while eating their lunch. They have their hunting dogs with them and in front of the group are hare carcasses. Behind them (in the middle) are their food baskets containing their lunch. The hunters naturally catch the eye, to the left there is a view beyond the open flat landscape. Approximately in the middle of the picture's horizon line, a beacon in Gammel Skagen can be seen.

== People ==
The figures in the painting include Krøyer himself in the extreme right (lying) with the reddish beard alongside his dog Rap. Michael Ancher is seated left of, and above, Krøyer. Others left to right: Degn Brøndum, owner of Brøndum hotel, is at the extreme left, architect Ulrik Plesner (lying on his stomach), artist Einar Hein, Skagen's city treasurer Hans Brodersen, and C.F. Dahlerup.

== Composition ==
The main lines of the composition are diagonal, which forms the slope the hunters are leaning on, and the horizon, which is located slightly above the upper horizontal third line. In the top right golden section is Skagen's clerk Johan Brodersen, in the upper horizontal line belonging to the golden section are several faces/heads: from left are Degn Brøndum, Einar Hein, Hans Brodersen, PS Krøyer and the dog Rap.

== Preliminary studies ==
Krøyer did several preliminary studies for Hunters of Skagen. At Skagens Museum there are four oil studies;

- Skagensjægere, 1897, oil on wood, 32 x 43 cm
- Krøyers Dog Rap, 1898, oil on wood, 43 x 31.5 cm
- Overplantor CF Dahlerup with Hunting Dog, 1898, oil on wood, 43.2 x 31.6 cm
- Architect Ulrik Plesner lying in the Dunes, 1898, 51.7 x 92.6 cm

In the Hirschsprung Collection the actual cardboard study is found, 1898, pastel on paper, 136.5 x 246.5 cm. Photographs from 1895 show a charcoal drawing of the motif over Krøyer's fireplace. A template measuring 32x43 cm and painted on wood was sold at auction at Ellekilde Auktioner A/S for DKK 1,550,000 on 2 December 2000.

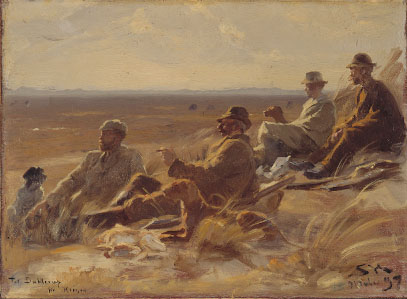
Hunters of Skagen (small version)

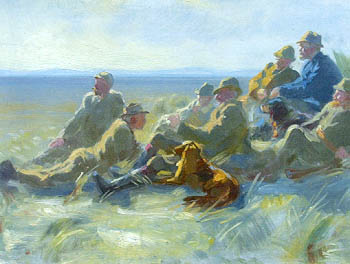
Skagen's hunters (sketch)

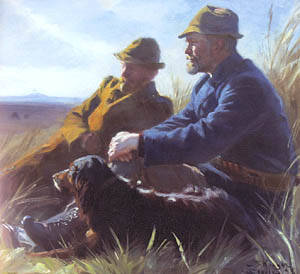
Preliminary study for "Skagen's Hunters"

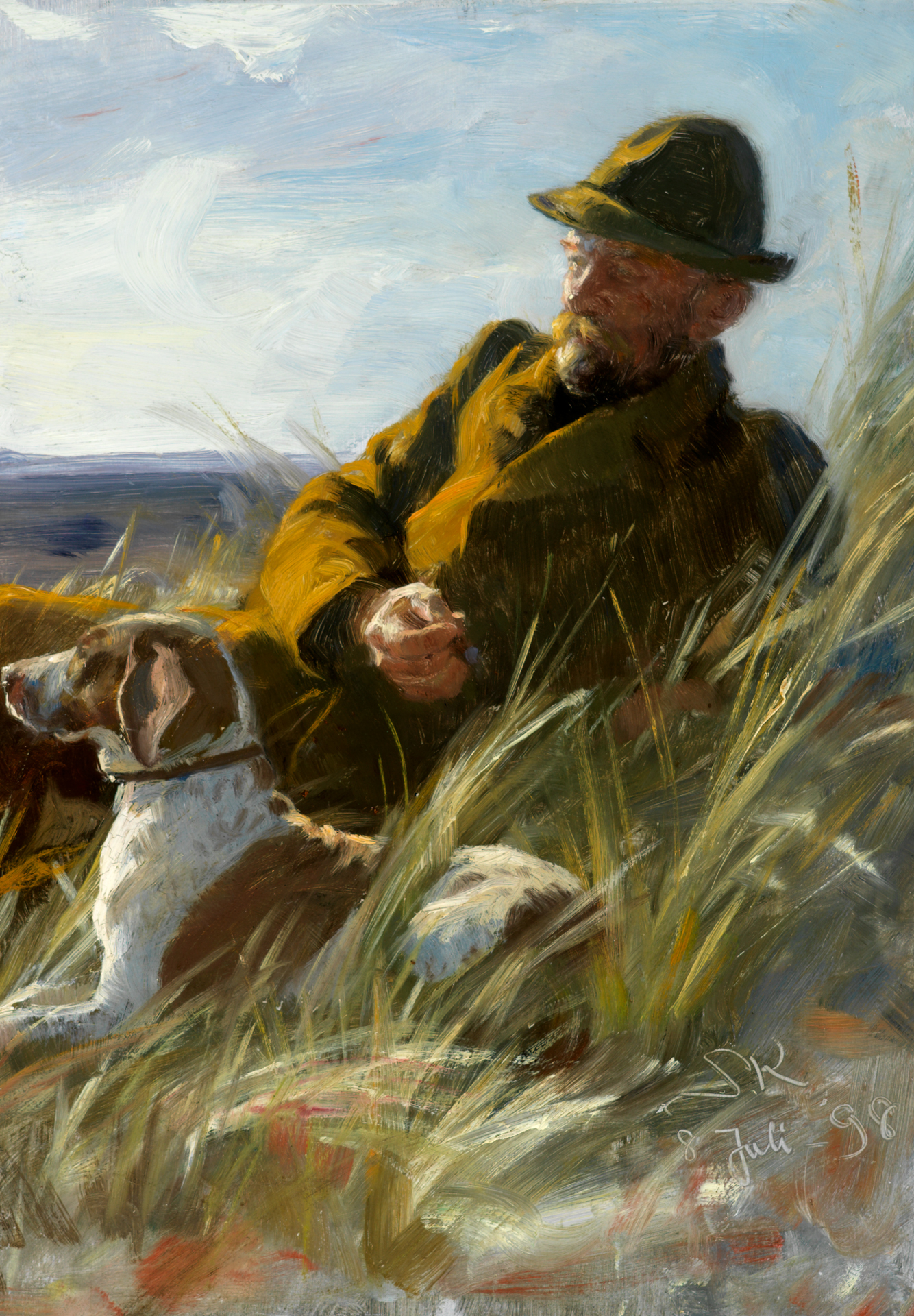
Overplanter CF Dahlerup with hunting dog.

Shot hares

== See also ==
- List of works by Peder Severin Krøyer
