= Marie in the garden =

1881 painting by Peder Severin Krøyer

- Marie i haven (Danish)
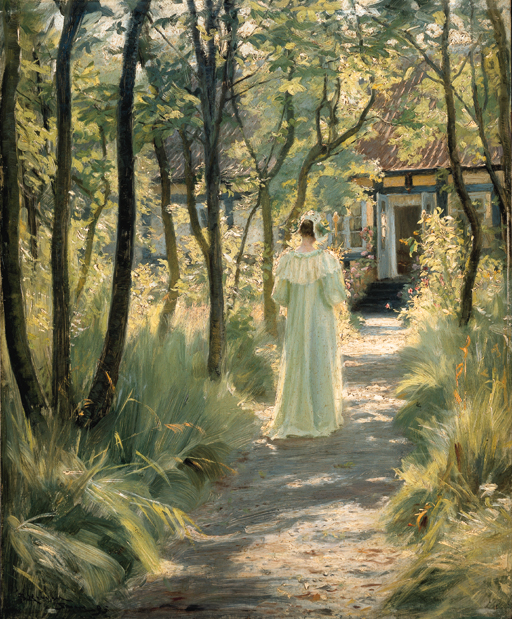
- Artist: Peder Severin Krøyer
- Year: 1895
- Medium: Oil on canvas
- Movement: Impressionism
- Dimensions: 58.2 cm × 47.9 cm (22.9 in × 18.9 in)
- Owner: Private collection

Marie in the garden (Danish: Marie i haven) is an 1895 painting by the Danish artist Peder Severin Krøyer. It depicts Krøyer's wife Marie Krøyer in the couple's garden in Skagen. The work measures 58.2 x 47.9 cm.

The work was sold at auction in 2000 at the Christie's auction house in London where it sold for £729,750. At the time of the sale this made the painting the second most expensive Danish work of art. The work is today in private ownership.

== See also ==
- List of works by Peder Severin Krøyer
