= Carl Johan Bonnesen =

Danish sculptor (1868–1933)

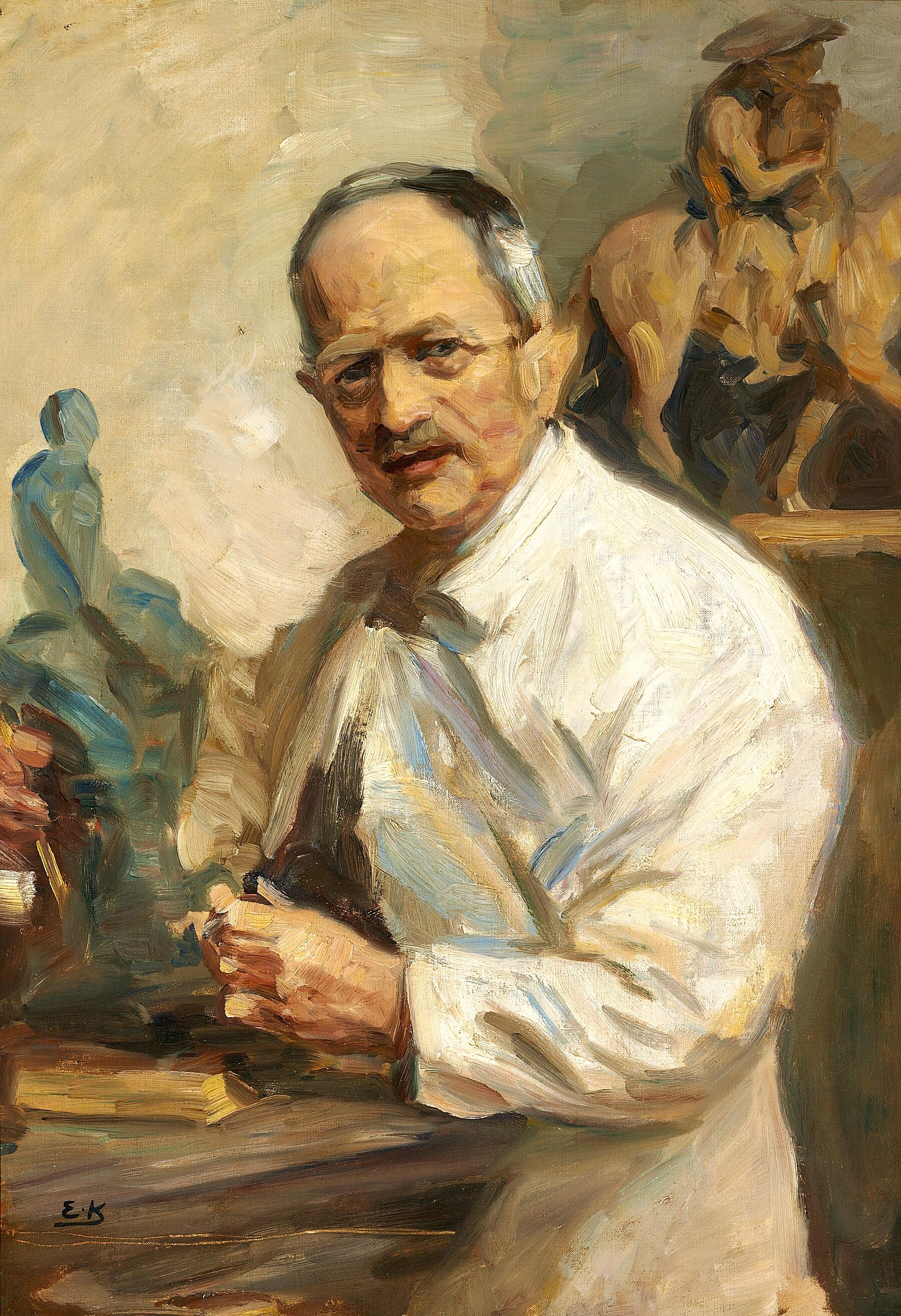
- Carl Bonnesen by Emil Axel Krause
- Born: 26 May 1868; Aalborg, Denmark
- Died: 13 December 1933 (aged 65); Copenhagen, Denmark
- Education: Royal Danish Academy of Fine Arts
- Known for: Sculpture
- Awards: Eckersberg Medal, 1900; Thorvaldsen Medal, 1930

Signature
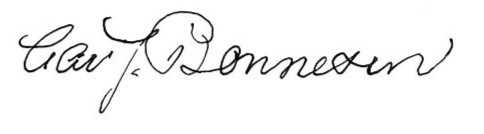

Carl Johan Bonnesen (26 May 1868 – 13 December 1933) was a Danish sculptor. He specialised in depictions of animals and exotic, "primitive" subjects as seen in the first sculpture he ever exhibited, A Victorious Group of Huns from 1889. It was soon followed by A Barbarian (1891), The Period of the Huns (1893), A Bedouin (1897) and A Mounted Chinese Warrior (1900).

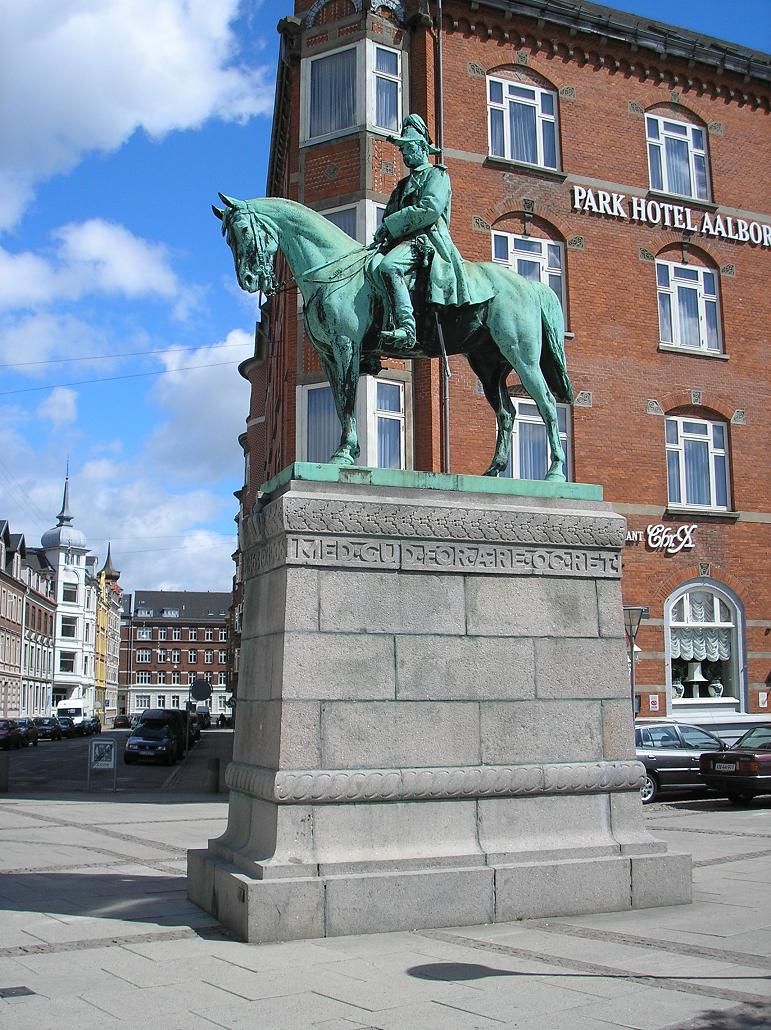
King Christian IX (1899)

== Biography ==
Bonnesen was born in Aalborg. He trained to become a carpenter for two years before moving to Copenhagen where he was admitted to the Royal Danish Academy of Fine Arts in 1887. There he studied under Theobald Stein and Christian Carl Peters, graduating in 1889. Bonnesen soon had many commissions. In 1891, at the age of 22, his first sculpture was acquired by tobacco manufacturer Heinrich Hirschsprung and cast in bronze. It is today exhibited in the garden by the Hirschsprung Collection.

His most important patron was Carl Jacobsen, founder of Carlsberg Brewery, who among other pieces, ordered Thor Driving Across the Arch of the Sky (1897). In copper, it stands on top of the Ny Carlsberg Brewhouse. Bonnesen's last great patron was jurist Harald Plum, who had the huge sculpture group Thor at War with the Jötunns (1891) placed on his private island, Thorø. It now stands by the Haustrup Plast factory on the outskirts of Odense. Other notable works include The Period of the Huns (1893), A Bedouin (1897) and A Mounted Chinese Warrior (1900).

Bonnesen travelled extensively during the 1890s. From 1894 to 1895, he stayed in Paris where he associated with the circle around Stephan Sinding with whom he had more in common than he had with Stein and Peters, his former teachers. In 1898, he went to Egypt and East Asia and his travels also took him to the United States.

Bonnesen had a large and diverse production of statues and statuettes. These include an equestrian statue of King Christian IX which stands on the market place in the centre of Esbjerg, Denmark. Designed in bronze, it was completed in 1899. Other notable works include Adam and Eve at the body of Abel (1900) and Two Lions in the Danish National Gallery as well as several statuettes in The Hirschsprung Collection. Many of Bonnesen's plaster casts have, since 1969, been exhibited in Thingbæk Kalkminer near Rebild Bakker.

== List of public statues ==
- A Barbarian (1891) - garden of the Hirschsprung Collection, Copenhagen
- Thor Driving Across the Arch of the Sky (1897) - roof of the Ny Carlsberg Brewhouse, Copenhagen
- Christian IX (1899) - Esbjerg, Denmark
- Diana (1908) - Trondhjems Plads, Copenhagen
- The Music (1913) - Wagnersvej, Copenhagen
- Thor at War with the Jötunns (1926) - grounds of Glud & Marstrand, Odense
- The Mother (1932) - Amorparken, Copenhagen

== Awards ==
- Eckersberg Medal, 1900
- Thorvaldsen Medal, 1930

== Gallery ==
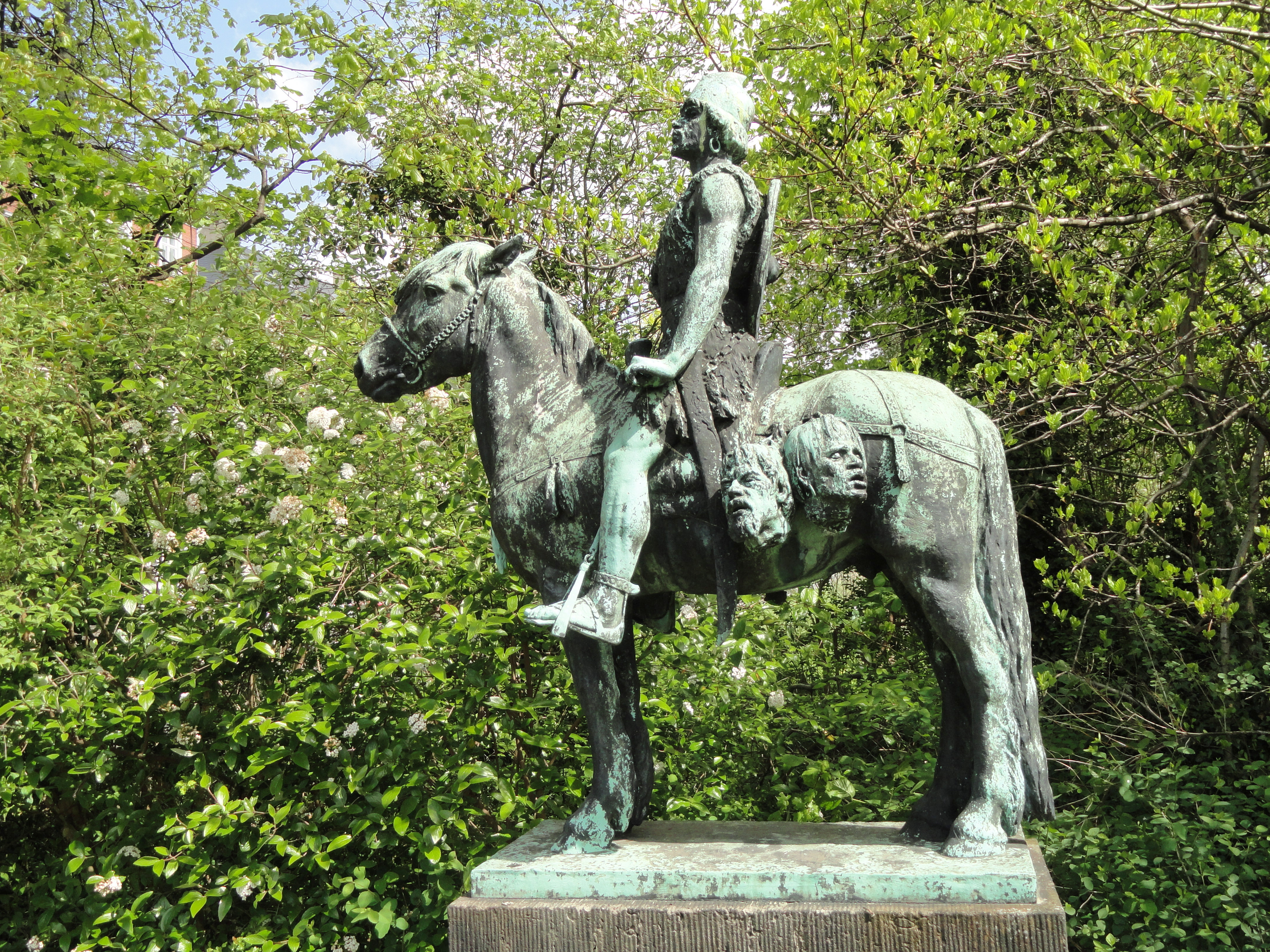
A Barbarian (1891)

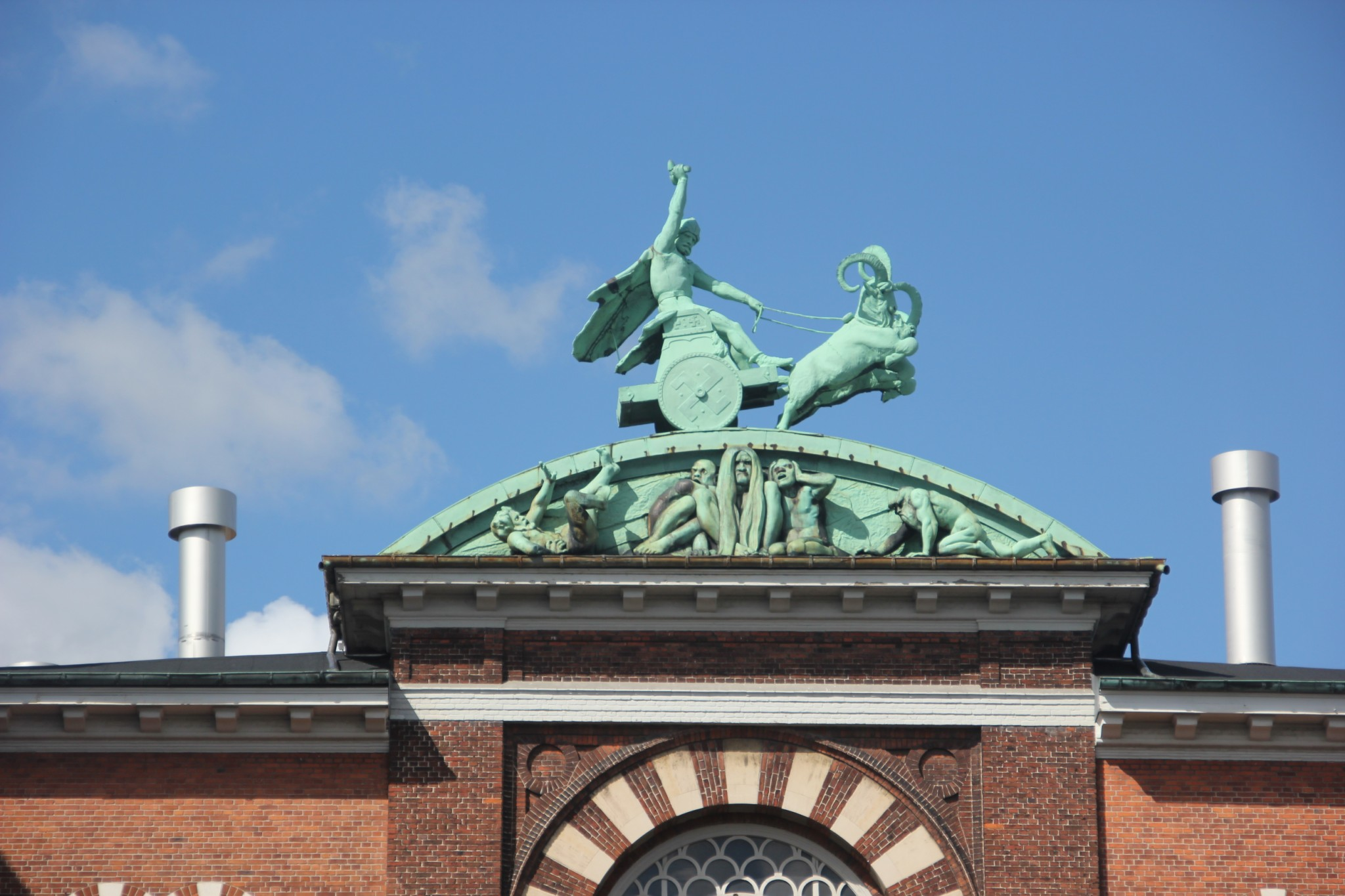
Thor at War with the Jötunns (1901)

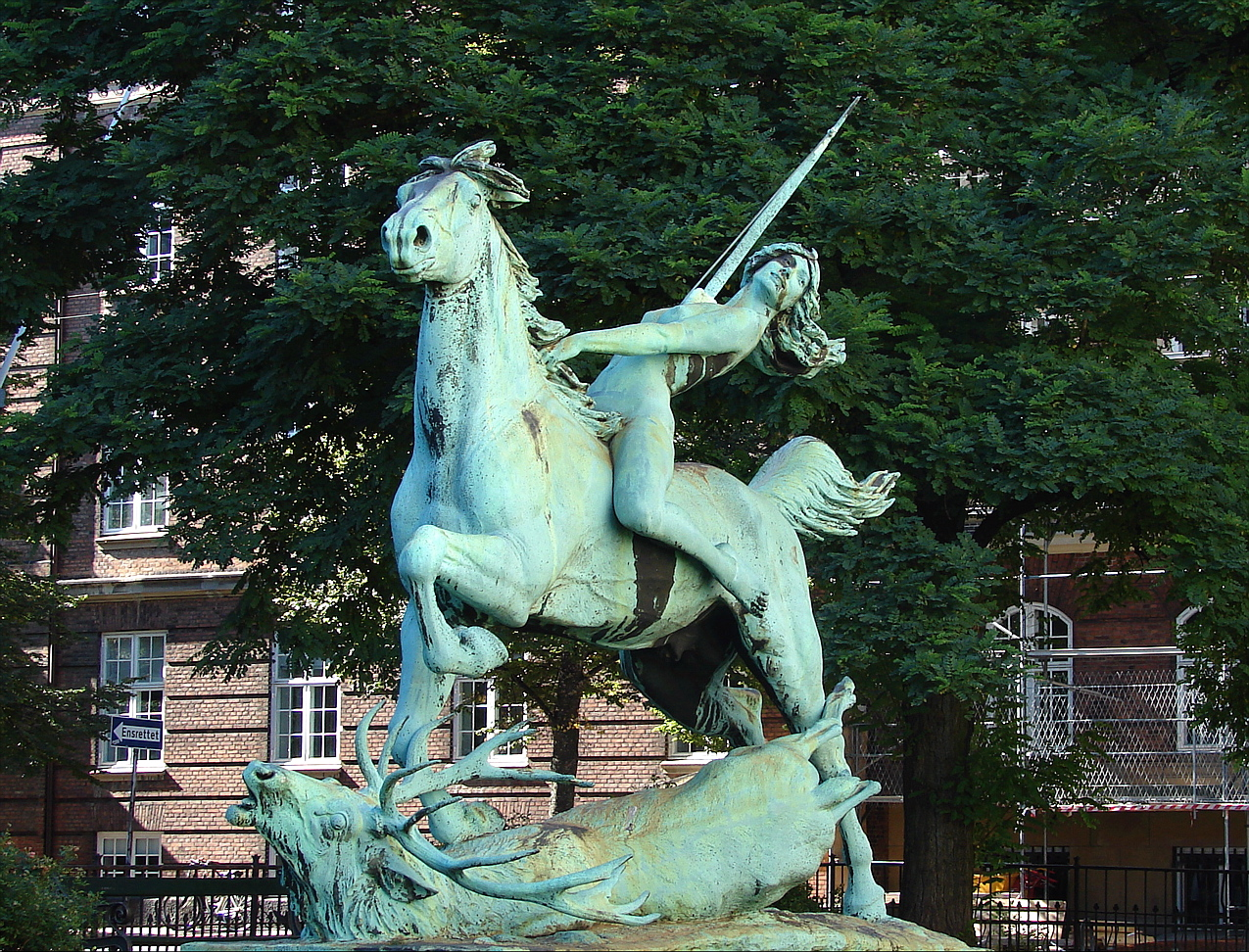
Diana (1908)

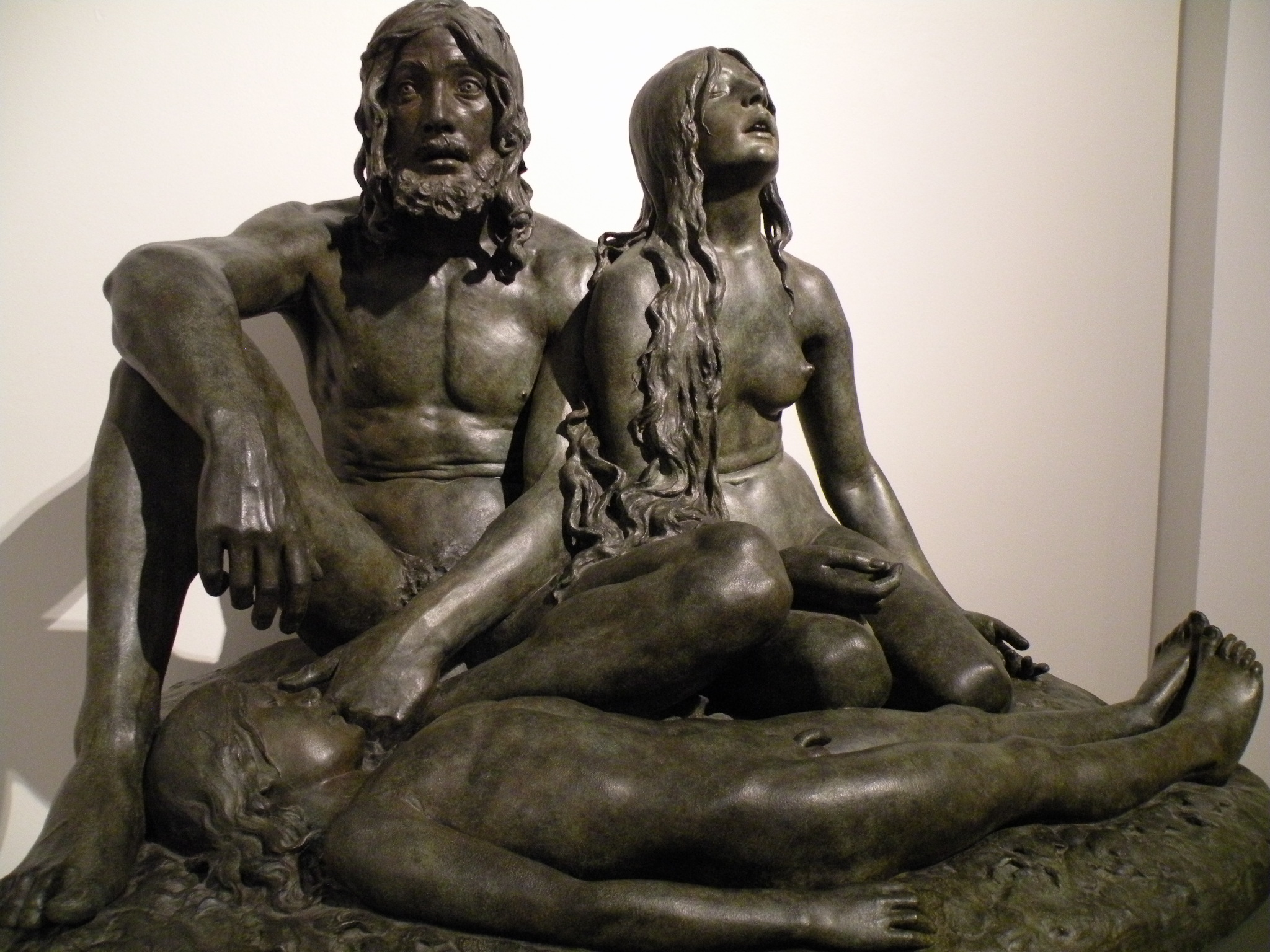
Adam and Eve at the body of Abel
(1900)

== See also ==
- Hans Christian Viggo-Hansen

== Other sources ==
- Gudrun Mangor (1995) Billedhuggeren Carl Johan Bonnesen 1868-1933. En brik i kulturmønsteret (Forlaget Falcon) ISBN 87-88802-10-8
