= Hans Christian Viggo-Hansen =

Hans Christian Viggo-Hansen (31 March 1859 – 6 October 1930) was a Danish painter, sculptor and artisan metalsmith.

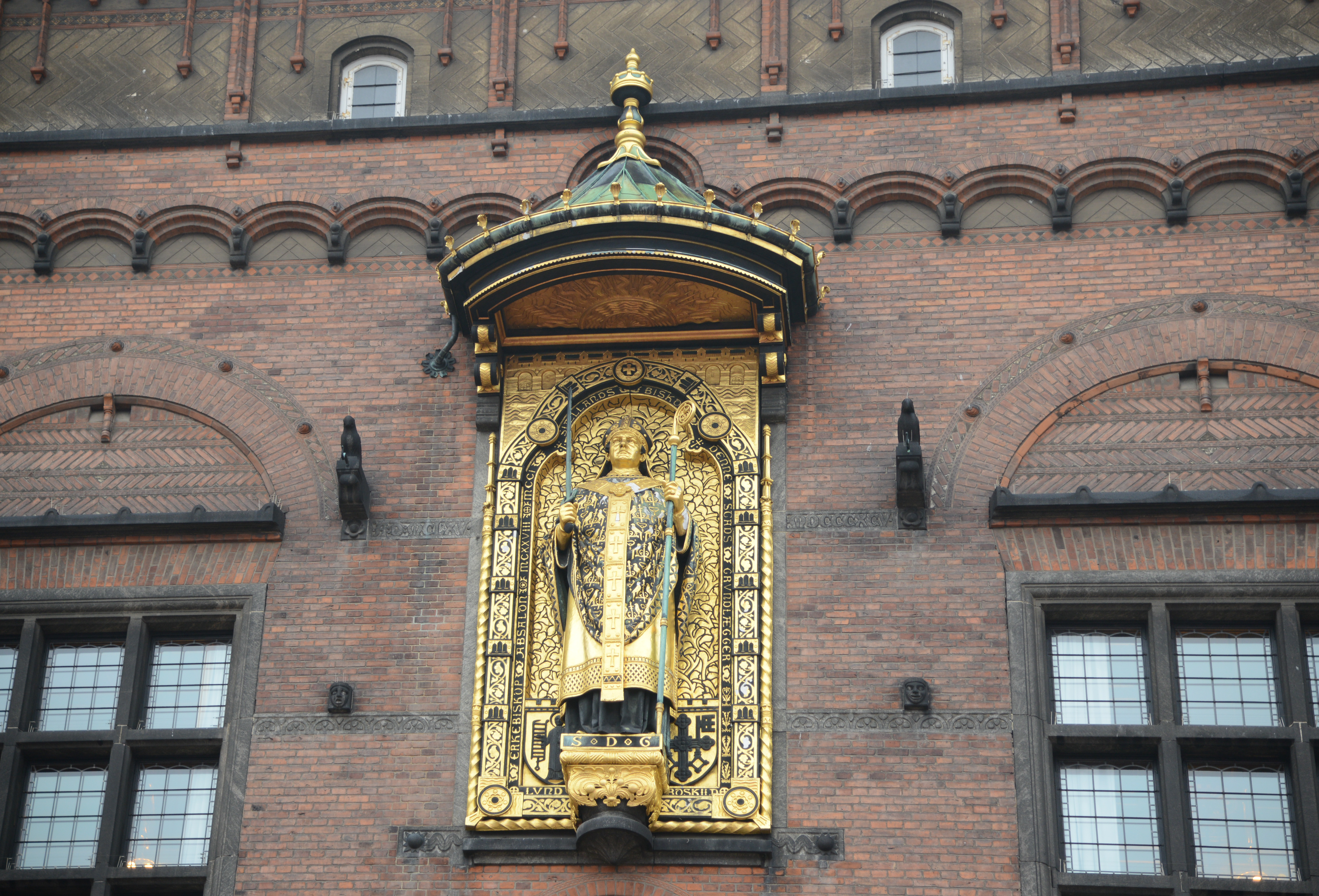
Absalon, Copenhagen City Hall, Copenhagen

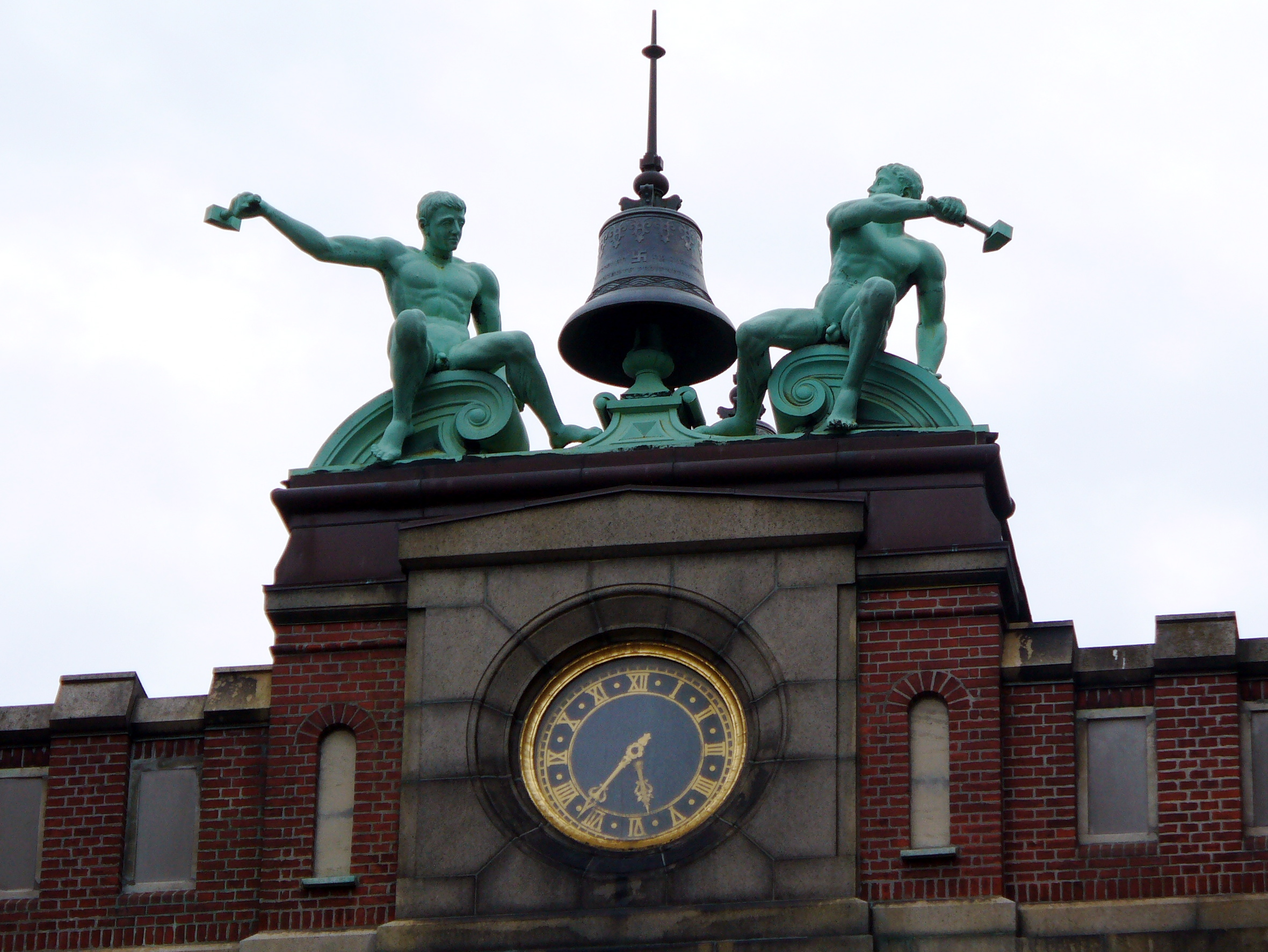
The Bell Strikers at the top of the Dupylon building

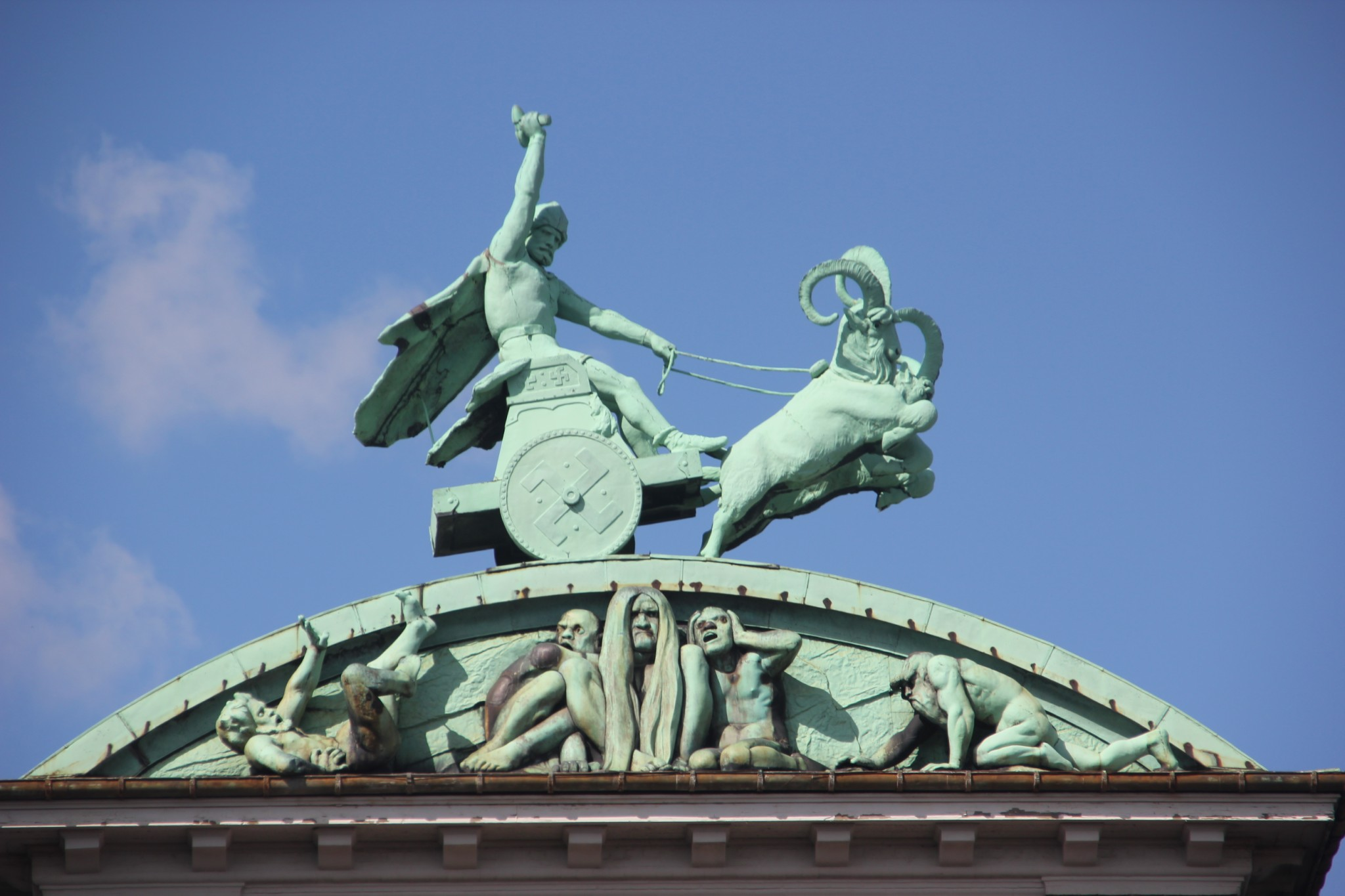
Thor sculpture at Ny Carlsberg Bryghus

== Biography ==
=== Early life and education ===
He was born Hans Christian Viggo Hansen in Copenhagen, the son of master brazier Peter Christian Hansen (1824–97) and Sara Marie Henriette Andersen (1824–84). He completed a brazier's apprenticeship in 1879 but had aspirations to become a painter. He received preparatory training in painting under painter and conservator Carl Christian Andersen (1849-1906) before attending the Royal Danish Academy of Fine Arts for three quarters of a year in 1882-83.

=== Career ===
He had his debut at the Charlottenborg Exhibition in 1885–86 with two paintings, A View of Christianshavns Kanal and A View of Copenhagen Harbour from Nybørs, but a visual impairment then forced him to give up painting. He then returned to his old trade, concentrating on executing sculptural works in hammered metals, both from his own designs and those of other artists.

Viggo-Hansen also created baptismal dishes in silver, tin and iron for a number of churches. A selection of these were featured on the Society of Decorative Art's exhibition in February–March 1903. This brought him in contact with H. A. Gruberts Sønners Metalvarefabrik where he served as artistic director for many years.

He went on study trips to Germany, Austria and Italy on grants from the Larssenske Legat and the Reiersen Foundation. Late in his life, he returned to painting, spending several summers on Bornholm painting seascapes. He died on 6 October 1930 and is buried in Bispebjerg Cemetery.

== Selected works ==
He was charged with executing Vilhelm Bissen's statue of Absalon for the new Copenhagen City Hall. It was awarded a gold medal on the Exposition Universelle in Paris in 1900. Vigo-Gansen was also responsible for creating other metalwork for the new city hall, including the coat of arms on the facade.

Danish brewer, art collector and philanthropist Carl Jacobsen (1842–1914) charged him with a number of prominent commissions for his many building projects, including Thor med sine bukke (by Carl Johan Bonnesen) for the Ny Carlsberg Brewhouse, the Bell-Strikers (based on a small sketch by Stephan Sinding) on the Dipylon Building and the angel for the spire of the Jesus Church and dragon ornaments for his own house (Viggo-Hansen's design).

Other works by Viggo-Hansen include the roof-top figure on Det Ny Teater (designed in collaboration with Jens Jacob Bregnø) and the fish on the Caritas Gountain in Gammeltorv were also created by Viggo-Hansen.
