= List of works by Peder Severin Krøyer =

This is a list of works by Peder Severin Krøyer, depicting the artistic career of Krøyer spread over a period of roughly 35 years, from 1866 until his death in 1909.

== List ==
=== Paintings ===
Image	Title	Year	Dimensions	Museum	Country	Ref
	Henrik Nikolaj Krøyer in his study	1866	13 × 12.8 cm			
	View towards Gammelholm with the tower of the Nikolaj church in the background. Clear summer evening in Copenhagen	1867	17.7 × 21.7 cm	Skagens Museum, Skagen	Denmark	
	Portrait of Henrik Nikolai Krøyer	1868	31 × 24.8 cm	Frederiksborg Museum, Hillerød	Denmark	
	View of roofs at Havnegade and the Nikolai tower	1868	17 × 21.8 cm			
	Portrait of Mrs. Prof. Cecilie Krøyer (b. Gjesdal), the artists adoptive mother.	1868	31.5 × 24.3 cm	Stavanger Museum, Stavanger	Norway	
	Portrait of the zoologist, Professor HN Krøyer, the artist's foster father	1868	32 × 24 cm	National Gallery of Denmark, Copenhagen	Denmark	
	Portrait of Elen Cecilie Gjesdahl	1869	24.4 × 19.4 cm	Skagens Museum, Skagen	Denmark	
	Portrait of the painter Frans Schwartz	1869	50 × 40 cm			
	Wintery scene at Mikkel Vibe's House, the artist's childhood home	1871	33 × 26.2 cm	Skagens Museum, Skagen	Denmark	
	A thatched house. Summer day with warm blue skies. Arranged with a couple of children	1871	20 × 34 cm			
	Study of a Woman from Arildsläge in Sweden in Festive Dress	1872	26 × 20 cm	Loeb Danish Art Collection	Denmark	
	Portrait of the artist's foster father the zoologian and professor Henrik Nicolai Krøyer	1872	76 × 63 cm			
	Portrait of Bertha Cecilie Krøyer	1872	110 × 87.7 cm	Skagens Museum, Skagen	Denmark	
	Study of an old woman with white cape. Arildsleje, Sweden	1872	32 × 25 cm			
	Villa on a moonlit night	1872	27 × 37 cm			
	Interior	1872	27 × 37 cm			
	Portrait of Otto Diderich Ottesen	1873	86.5 × 70 cm	Frederiksborg Museum, Hillerød	Denmark	
	The blacksmith Hans Pedersen of Hornbæk. Study	1873	44 × 24.2 cm			
	A girl on the beach, Hornbæk	1873	35 × 26 cm			
	Evening sky. Overcast	1873	35.7 × 23.6 cm	Skagens Museum, Skagen	Denmark	
	A Smithy in Hornbæk	1873	36 × 28 cm	National Gallery of Denmark, Copenhagen	Denmark	
	Seated Fisherman’s Daughter, Hornbæk	1874	30 × 25 cm	Loeb Danish Art Collection	Denmark	
	A fisherman from Hornbæk	3 August 1874	22.5 × 13 cm	Hirschsprung Collection, Copenhagen	Denmark	
	Morning at Hornbæk. The fishermen returning	1875	102.7 × 161.5 cm	Hirschsprung Collection, Copenhagen	Denmark	
	Little girl from Hornbæk	1875	21.4 x 16.5 cm	Hirschsprung Collection, Copenhagen	Denmark	
	The Blacksmith in Hornbæk	1875	91 x 118.7 cm	Hirschsprung Collection, Copenhagen	Denmark	
	Fishermen at Stokken in Hornbæk	1875	109 x 153 cm			
	Snow covered mountains. Tirol	1875	18 x 25 cm			
	Morning at Hornbæk. Men and women bargaining	1875	22.2 x 39.8 cm	Hirschsprung Collection, Copenhagen	Denmark	
	Portrait of the Norwegian painter Eilif Peterssen	1875	24 x 18 cm	Lillehammer Art Museum, Lillehammer	Norway	
	Portrait of a fisherman from Hornbæk	1875	39.2 x 35 cm	National Gallery of Denmark, Copenhagen	Denmark	
	Four children having lunch	1877	39 x 51 cm			
	Siblings	1877	41 x 33 cm			
	Study of the beach on a grey day at St. Malo	1877	21 × 33 cm	Hirschsprung Collection, Copenhagen	Denmark	
	Female model. Half figure	9 April 1878	54.5 x 46.1 cm			
	Two Gipsy Women Outside their Cottage. Spain	1878	182 x 156 cm	National Gallery of Denmark, Copenhagen	Denmark	
	Ronda	9 April 1878	28 x 36 cm			
	Artists' lunch. Cernay-la-Ville	1879	53 × 95 cm	Skagens Museum, Skagen	Denmark	
	In a cellar in Concarneau	1879	28 x 22 cm			
	Portrait of Alfred Guillou	1879	32.5 x 23.3 cm	National Gallery of Denmark, Copenhagen	Denmark	
	French forest workers returning home from work	1879	80 x 100 cm	Ribe Kunstmuseum, Ribe	Denmark	
	The sardines of Concarneau	1879	115.5 x 155.5 cm	National Gallery of Denmark, Copenhagen	Denmark	
	A farmer from Faouet sitting down	1879	32.3 x 23.5 cm	Stavanger Museum, Stavanger	Norway	
	Hatters in an Italian village	1880	135.3 × 107 cm	Hirschsprung Collection, Copenhagen	Denmark	
	Italian field laborers. Abruzzo	1880	124.3 × 186 cm	Funen's Art Museum, Odense	Denmark	
	The Garden at Albergo del Liri in Sora. the Abruzzi	1880	34 x 43,5 x 6 cm	Skagen's Museum, Skagen	Denmark	
	A little girl in peasant dress, playing with a cat.	1880	73.3 × 52.5 cm	Private collection,		
	Breakfast in Sora	1880	24 × 33 cm	National Gallery, Oslo	Norway	
	The Hirschsprung family portrait	1881	109.5 × 135 cm	Hirschsprung Collection	Denmark	
	Messalina	1881	142 × 105 cm	Gothenburg Museum of Art, Gothenburg	Sweden	
	A trip on the Seine	1881	12.7 × 21.7 cm	Skagen's Museum, Skagen	Denmark	
	Portrait of Frederikke Tuxen	1882	45 × 31 cm			
	In the store when there is no fishing	1882	79,5 x 109,8 cm	Hirschsprung Collection, Copenhagen	Denmark	
	Portrait of the architect Ferdinand Meldahl	1882	cm	Frederiksborg Museum, Hillerød	Denmark	
	Portrait of the architect Ferdinand Meldahl (Pastorale)	1882	cm	Danish National Gallery, Copenhagen	Denmark	
	Storm at sea	1882	22.2 × 33.1 cm	Skagen's Museum, Skagen	Denmark	
	Artists on Skagen South Beach	1882	32.7 × 53.3 cm	Skagen's Museum, Skagen	Denmark	
	Portrait of Niels W. Gade	1882	cm			
	Seascape. Skagen	1882	47.5 × 62 cm	Danish National Gallery, Copenhagen	Denmark	
	The Southern Beech of Skagen. June.	June 1882	31 × 47 cm		Denmark	
	Artists' Luncheon at Skagen	1883	cm			
	Fishermen hauling nets, North Beach, Skagen	1883	cm			
	Fishermen on Skagen Beach	1883	148 x 202.5 cm	Danish National Gallery, Copenhagen	Denmark	
	Michael Ancher painting Anna Ancher, who is standing in the doorway	1883	cm	Anchers Hus, Skagen	Denmark	
	Skiveskydning. 9. juni 1883	1883	12.5 x 21.8 cm	Anchers Hus, Skagen	Denmark	
	Eilif Peterssen	1883	35 x 29 cm	Skagens Museum, Skagen	Denmark	
	Fiskere, Skagen	1883	47.8 x 37.3 cm	Stavanger Museum, Stavanger	Norway	
	Footprints in the sand	1883	24 x 32.5 cm	Skagens Museum, Skagen	Denmark	
	A fisherman dragging in the net at Skagen North Beach. Study.	1883	55 x 40 cm			
	A fair-haired boy. Portrait of Jens Drachmann.	1883	44 x 32 cm			
	A fisherman resting in the sand with his chest against his arms	1883	43 x 57 cm			
	From Skagen Sønderstrand.	1883	137 x 122 cm	Kunsthalle Kiel, Kiel	Germany	
	Summer Evening on the Beach at Skagen	1884	137 x 191 cm	Nationalmuseum, Stockholm	Sweden	
	Summer Day on Skagen's Southern Beach	1884	154.5 x 212.5 cm	Hirschsprung Collection	Denmark	
	Little girl standing on Skagen's southern Beach	1884	31.5 x 20.4 cm	Skagens Museum, Skagen	Denmark	
	Fra Skagen Sønderstrand	1884	40 x 60 cm	Landesmuseum Hannover, Hannover	Germany	
	Oscar Björck	1884	34 x 31.8 cm	Skagens Museum, Skagen	Denmark	
	Skagen Sønderstrand. Aften	1884	12.6 x 21.8 cm	Skagens Museum, Skagen	Denmark	
	Dead rays	1884	31.8 x 52.4 cm	Skagens Museum, Skagen	Denmark	
	Christoffer's house at dusk.	1884	12.5 x 21 cm			
	Anna Ancher	1884	34.5 x 31 cm	Skagens Museum, Skagen	Denmark	
	Anna Palm	1884	34 x 30 cm	Skagens Museum, Skagen	Denmark	
	Fritz Stoltenberg	1884	34 x 30 cm	Skagens Museum, Skagen	Denmark	
	A Summer's day at Skagen South beach. Study.	1884	20.6 x 28.5 cm			
	Skagboere går ud på nattefiskeri. Sildig Sommeraften.	1884	160 × 245 cm	Musée d'Orsay, Paris	France	
	The Iron Foundry, Burmeister & Wain	1885	144 x 194 cm	Danish National Gallery, Copenhagen	Denmark	
	Interior of a Tavern	1886	85.7 × 114.3 cm	Philadelphia Museum of Art, Philadelphia	United States	
	A duet	1887	106 x 93 cm	Skagens Museum, Skagen	Denmark	
	Portrait of Thorvald Niss	1887	35.5 × 25 cm	Hirschsprung Collection, Copenhagen	Denmark	
	Hip, Hip, Hurrah!	1888	134.5 × 165.5 cm	Gothenburg Museum of Art, Gothenburg	Sweden	
	Committee for the French Art Exhibition in Copenhagen	1888	73 × 100 cm	Hirschsprung Collection, Copenhagen	Denmark	
	Boys bathing on a summer evening at Skagen Beach	1889	153 × 100 cm	Danish National Gallery, Copenhagen	Denmark	
	Treshing in the Abruzzi	1890	58 × 98.5 cm	Danish National Gallery, Copenhagen	Denmark	
	Portrait of Baron Otto Ditlev Rosenørn-Lehn	1891	95 x 79.5 cm	Danish National Gallery, Copenhagen	Denmark	
	Summer Evening at Skagen. The Artist's Wife and Dog by the Shore	1892	206 x 123 cm	Ny Carlsberg Glyptotek	Denmark	
	Boys bathing on a summer evening at Skagen Beach	1892	60.5 x 38.5 cm			
	Marie in the garden on Skagen	1892	22 x 32 cm			
	Study of a beach	1892	61 x 43 cm			
	Bathing boy	1892	32.5 x 22.5 cm			
	Summer Evening on Skagen's Southern Beach	1893	126.5 x 178.7 cm	Skagens Museum, Skagen	Denmark	
	Roses	1893	67.5 by 76.5 cm	Skagens Museum, Skagen	Denmark	
	A luncheon. The artist, his wife and the writer Otto Benzon	1893	39.2 x 50 cm	Hirschsprung Collection, Copenhagen	Denmark	
	Hens under the trees at Madam Bendsen's farm	1893	44.2 x 56.2 cm	Skagens Museum, Skagen	Denmark	
	Summer evening at the South beach, Skagen. Anna Ancher and Marie Krøyer	1893	27.8 x 45.8 cm	Hirschsprung Collection, Copenhagen	Denmark	
	Summer evening at the South beach, Skagen. Anna Ancher and Marie Krøyer (study)	1893	38.5 x 50 cm	Hirschsprung Collection, Copenhagen	Denmark	
	The Benzon daughters	1897	cm	Trapholt Art Museum, Vejle	Denmark	
	Self-portrait, 1897	1897	40.9 x 31.6 cm	Hirschsprung Collection, Copenhagen	Denmark	
	A Meeting in the Royal Danish Academy of Sciences and Letters	1897	266.7 x 519.4 cm	Royal Danish Academy of Sciences and Letters, Copenhagen	Denmark	
	Portrait of Heinrich Hirschsprung	1898	92 x 85 cm	Hirschsprung Collection, Copenhagen	Denmark	
	Hunters of Skagen (Une moderne Olympia)	1898	cm	ARoS Aarhus Museum of Art, Aarhus	Denmark	
	Overplanter CF Dahlerup with hunting dog.	July 1898	43.2 x 31.6 cm	Skagens Museum, Skagen	Denmark	
	Self-portrait with a light felt hat	August 1898	33 × 26 cm			
	Summer evening on Skagen's beach	1899	135 x 187 cm	Hirschsprung Collection, Copenhagen	Denmark	
	A moonlit Skagen beach	1899	48 × 65 cm			
	Evening scene with houses and poplars	1899	27 × 41 cm			
	Head of a boy	1899	12 × 12 cm			
	Skagen Beach in Moonlight	1889	32.3 × 43.2 cm	National Gallery of Denmark, Copenhagen	Denmark	
	Boys Bathing at Skagen. Summer Evening	1889	100.5 × 153 cm	National Gallery of Denmark, Copenhagen	Denmark	
	Portrait of Countess Lillie Suzanne Raben-Levetzau	1889	55 × 32 cm	National Gallery of Denmark, Copenhagen	Denmark	
	Study of the sky. Sunset over Skagen	19 June 1899	33 × 43 cm			
	Beach scene from Skagen. Fishermen standing at a boat. The lighthouse is lit	18 August 1899	33 × 42 cm			
	Portrait of Georg Brandes	1899	cm	Hirschsprung Collection, Copenhagen	Denmark	
	Blue marine	1900	31 × 42 cm			
	Portrait of the artist´s wife: Marie Kröyer	1901	179 × 100 cm	Malmö Art Museum, Malmö	Sweden	
	Flowering cacti near Toarmina. In the background Mount Etna covered in snow	1901	32 × 43 cm			
	Evening landscape by the ancient theatre in Taormina with a view of Etna and the Gulf	1901	32 × 43 cm			
	The ancient theatre in Taormina	1901	33 × 65 cm			
	Portrait of Georg Brandes lecturing	1901	42.9 x 32.1 cm	Hirschsprung Collection, Copenhagen	Denmark	
	Norwegian landscape. Study for the background to the portrait of Bjørnson	1901	46 × 36 cm			
	Portrait of Bjørnstjerne Bjørnson	1901	170 × 130 cm	National Theatre, Oslo	Norway	
	Portrait of Dagny Bjørnson Langen	10 August 1901	75 × 58.5 cm			
	Autumn landscape. View from Castle St. Valentin in Tyrol	November 1901	30 × 70 cm			
	Self-Portrait, Sitting by His Easel at Skagen Beach	1902	54 × 45 cm	Loeb Danish Art Collection	Denmark	
	Portrait of the poet Holger Drachmann in Skagen garden	1902	32.5 x 40.8 cm	Hirschsprung Collection, Copenhagen	Denmark	
	View from Copenhagen City Hall	1902	40.7 x 65.7 cm	Hirschsprung Collection, Copenhagen	Denmark	
	Portrait of the author Jonas Lie	1902	100 x 100 cm	Gyldendal Norsk Forlag, Oslo	Norway	
	Portrait of Georg Brandes giving a lecture	1902	148.5 x 117.5 cm	Frederiksborg Museum, Hillerød	Denmark	
	Portrait of Vilhelm Herold as Lohengrin	1902				
	At the Fireplace	1903	106.2 x 146 cm	Skagens Museum, Skagen	Denmark	
	Portrait of Octavius Hansen	1903	41 x 33 cm			
	Soffi and Holger Drachmann	14 July 1903		Drachmanns Hus, Skagen	Denmark	
	Men of Industry	1904	116 x 185 cm	Frederiksborg Museum, Hillerød	Denmark	
	Dinner party in Wiesbaden, Germany	31 October 1904	11 x 16 cm			
	Anna and Michael Ancher at their silver wedding	1905	54.3 x 71.1 cm	Anchers Hus, Skagen	Denmark	
	Midsummer Eve Bonfire on Skagen Beach	1906	149.5 x 257 cm	Skagens Museum, Skagen	Denmark	
	Portrait of Julius Paulsen	1907	35 x 31 cm	Skagens Museum, Skagen	Denmark	
	Portrait of Hans Gyde Petersen	1907	35 x 31 cm	Skagens Museum, Skagen	Denmark	
	Skagen Sønderstrand on a June evening with cloudy weather. Fishing nets in front	June 1907	33 x 41 cm			
	Bathing boys	1908	48 x 61 cm	Johannes Larsen Museet, Kerteminde	Denmark	
	Portrait of Jens Ferdinand Willumsen	1908	35 x 31.5 cm	Skagens Museum, Skagen	Denmark	
	Portrait of Henrik Pontoppidan	1908	34.4 x 31.7 cm	Skagens Museum, Skagen	Denmark	
	Study for portrait of Holger Drachmann	June 1908	81 x 66 cm			
	Final self-portrait	1909	40.8 x 32.4 cm	Anchers Hus, Skagen	Denmark	
	Vibeke Krøyer in the garden	1909	54 x 31.5 cm	Skagens Museum, Skagen	Denmark	
	Self-portrait at the easel	Unknown	51 x 41.3 cm			
	Copenhagen: Roofs Under the Snow	Late 19th century	17.78 × 22.86 cm	Los Angeles County Museum of Art, Los Angeles	United States	

=== Drawings ===
Image	Title	Year	Dimensions	Museum	Country	Ref
	Study of a girl from Hornbæk holding a small child	10 June 1873	19.5 × 12.5 cm			
	Scenery with a young woman looking out on a sailboat on the sea.	1873	16 × 14 cm			
	A fisherman's daughter in the dunes	July 1874	19 × 12 cm			
	Study of a standing bearded man	1877	61 × 46 cm			
	Portrait of Hugo Birger	1879	25 × 22 cm	Nationalmuseum, Stockholm	Sweden	
	Portrait of Pauline Drucker. Study.	1883	136 × 80 cm			
	Vilhelmine Bramsen, Beatrice Diderichsen and Marianne Stokes	14 August 1886		Anchers Hus, Skagen	Denmark	
	The cellist Franz Neruda. Sketch.	1886	20 × 26 cm			
	Back of Jan Steen, Florence	1889	5.4 × 9.7 cm	Nationalmuseum, Stockholm	Sweden	
	Portrait of Otto Benzon	23 August 1895				
	Portrait of Holger Drachmann	1895				
	Portrait of Karl Gjellerup	26 May 1897				
	Dinner at Aulestad	1901				
	Sitting girl	Unknown	17.6 × 11.7 cm	Nationalmuseum, Stockholm	Sweden	
	Portrait of the sculptor Ingel Fallstedt	Unknown	34 × 21 cm	Nationalmuseum, Stockholm	Sweden	
	Interior of a restaurant on Skagen	Unknown	22 × 29.6.7 cm	Nationalmuseum, Stockholm	Sweden	
	The pharmacist Otto Benzon riding a bike	Unknown	102 × 79 cm			
