= Messalina (painting) =

Painting by Peder Severin Krøyer

- Artist: Peder Severin Krøyer
- Year: 1881
- Type: Oil on canvas, history painting
- Dimensions: 142 cm × 102 cm (56 in × 40 in)
- Location: Gothenburg Museum of Art; Gothenburg

Messalina is an 1881 history painting by the Danish artist Peder Severin Krøyer. It depicts Messalina, the wife of the Roman Emperor Claudius who became notorious for her promiscuity and involvement in conspiracies, for which she was eventually executed. Krøyer shows her in the royal box at the amphitheatre, standing in a translucent robe.

It was produced while Krøyer was in Rome. He painted the Italian model Vittoria who had recently also posed for Aimé Morot's Medea, which he had seen at the Salon of 1877 in Paris. Rather than display this painting at the Paris Salon, Krøyer sent the painting to the 1881 Nordic Art Exhibition held in Gothenburg in Sweden. Today the painting is in the Gothenburg Museum of Art.

== See also ==
- List of works by Peder Severin Krøyer

== Bibliography ==
- Lehmann, Mette H. & Lobstein, Dominique. Krøyer and Paris: French Connections and Nordic Colours. Aarhus University Press, 2022.
- Svenningsen, Jesper. Champagneårene: Kunsthandel og udstillingsliv i København 1870-1920. Aarhus University Press, 2024.
