= A.M. Hirschsprung & Sønner =

Former Danish tobacco company

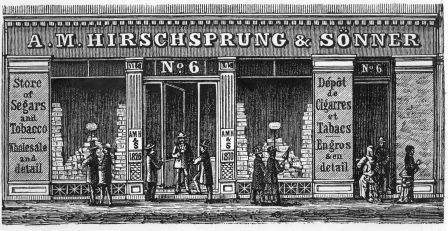
A.M. Hirschsprung & Sønner

A.M. Hirschsprung & Sønner was a Danish tobacco company based in Copenhagen, Denmark.

== History ==
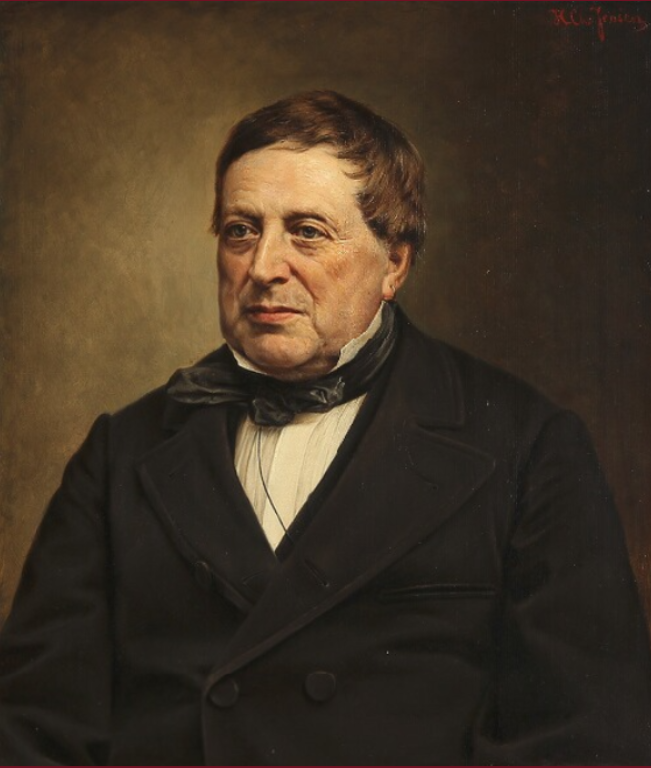
Abraham Marcus Hirschsprung

The company was founded in 1826 when Abraham Marcus Hirschsprung (1793 - 1871), who had come to Denmark from Hamburg, established a tobacco store in the basement of Hotel d'Angleterre. The hotel was then located at the corner of Østergade (No.2) and Kongens Nytorv.

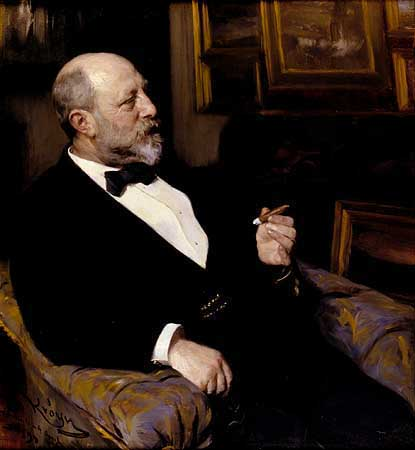
Heinrich Hirschsprung painted by P. S. Krøyer in 1898

A.M. Hirschsprung was still just a small company when it was taken over by two of Hirschsprung's sons Bernhard Hirschsprung (1834 - 1909) and Heinrich Hirschsprung (1836-1908). Heinrich Hirschsprung was put in charge of the commercial activities while Bernhard Hirschsprung was responsible for the production. Heinrich Hirschsprung, a passionate art collector, founded the Hirschsprung Collection in Copenhagen.

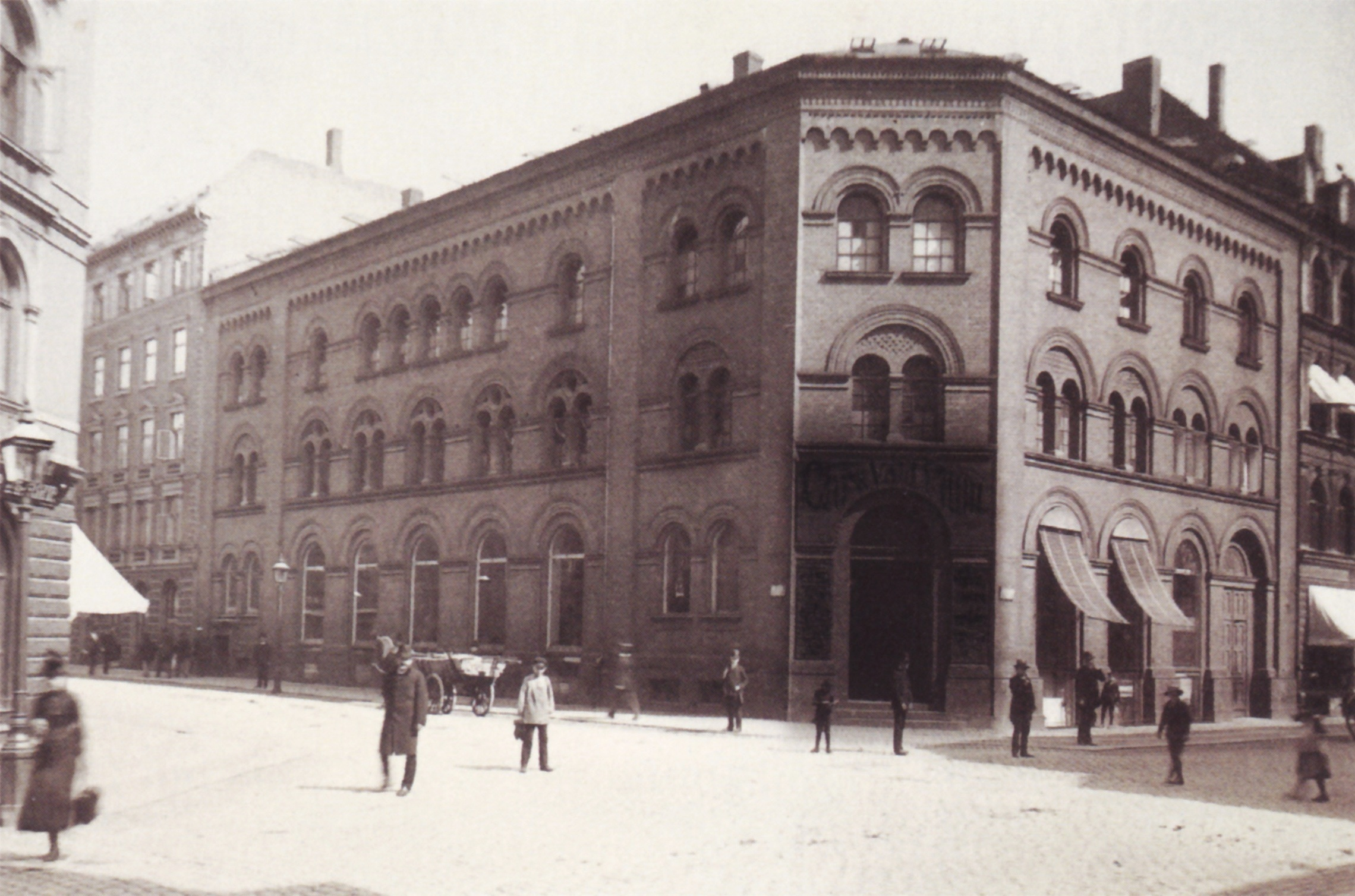
The Tobacco factory in Tordenskjoldsgade

Under Heinrich and Barnhard Hirschsprung's leadership, A. M. Hirschsprung & Sønner grew to become one of the leading tobacco companies in the country. They purchased a property at Østergade 6 in 1864 and replaced it with a new building in 1870. They also constructed a new tobacco factory at Tordenskjoldsgade 7–9 in the new Gammelholm neighbourhood. The factory was completed in 1866 to design by Ove Pedersen (1830-1892) and later altered by Axel Maar (1888-1978).

The company was converted into a limited company (aktieselskab) in 1899. Holger Hirschsprung was appointed as CEO and the board members were H. N. Andersen, Is. Glückstadt, Bernhard og Heinrich Hirschsprung and A. B. Munter.

In 1855, A.M. Hirschsprung & Sønner moved to a new headquarters in Virum. The company was taken over by Scandinavian Tobacco Group in 1972.

== Legacy ==
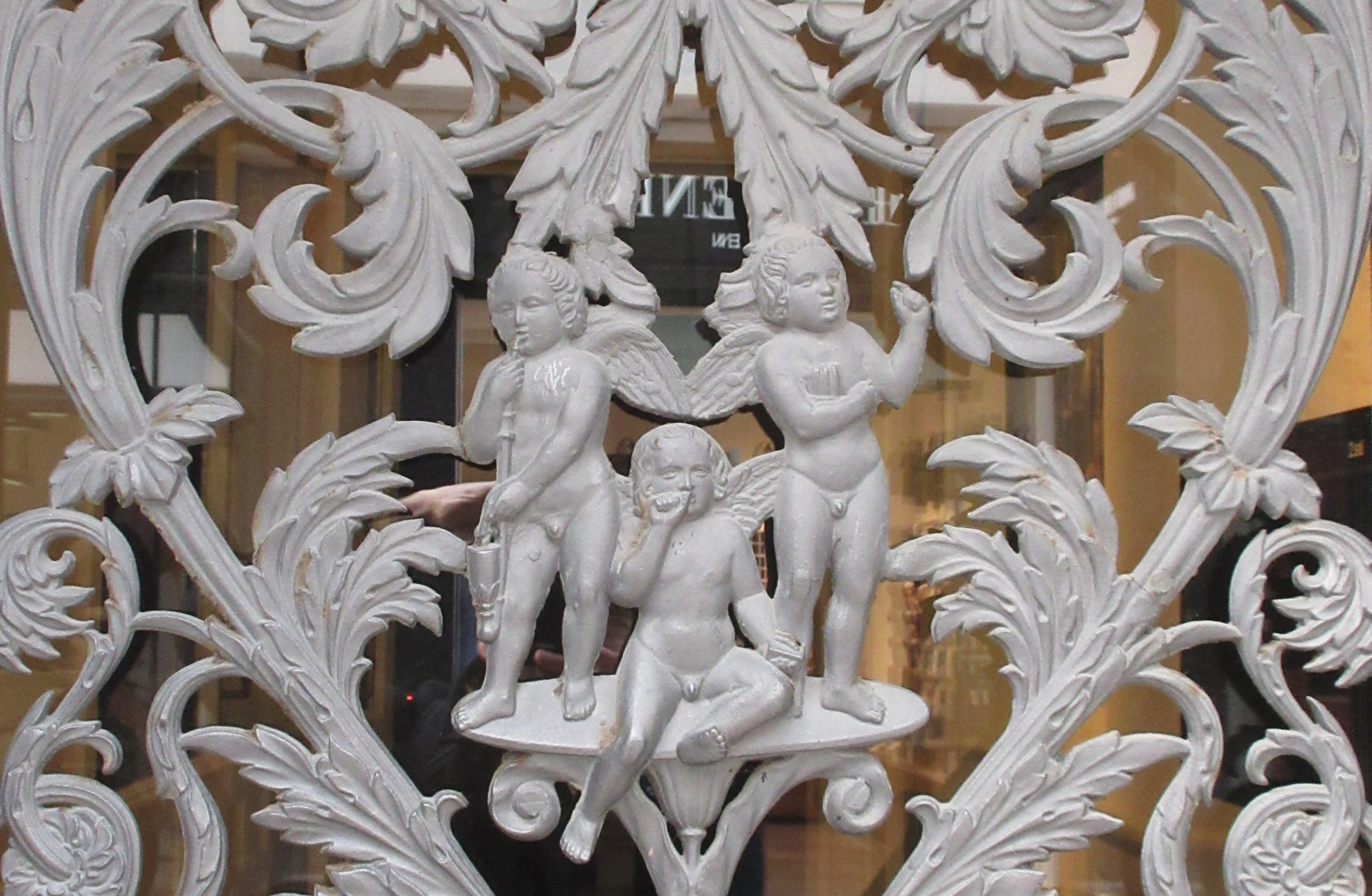
Smoking angels on the door of Østergade 6

A.M. Hirschsprung & Sønner's former properties on Østergade, Tordenskjoldsgade and Virum have survived. The door of the building at Østergade 6 features rough iron decorations with smoking angels.

The building in Virum, now known as Hirschsprung House (Hirschsprungs Hus), was sold by Scandinavian Tobacco Group in 1985 and has served as headquarters for Rambøll. The building is now owned by the pension fund PKA. It was refurbished in 2017 and NNE, a Novo Nordisk subsidiary, is now based in the building.

== See also ==
- P. Wulff
