= Ny Carlsberg Brewhouse =

Building in Copenhagen, Denmark

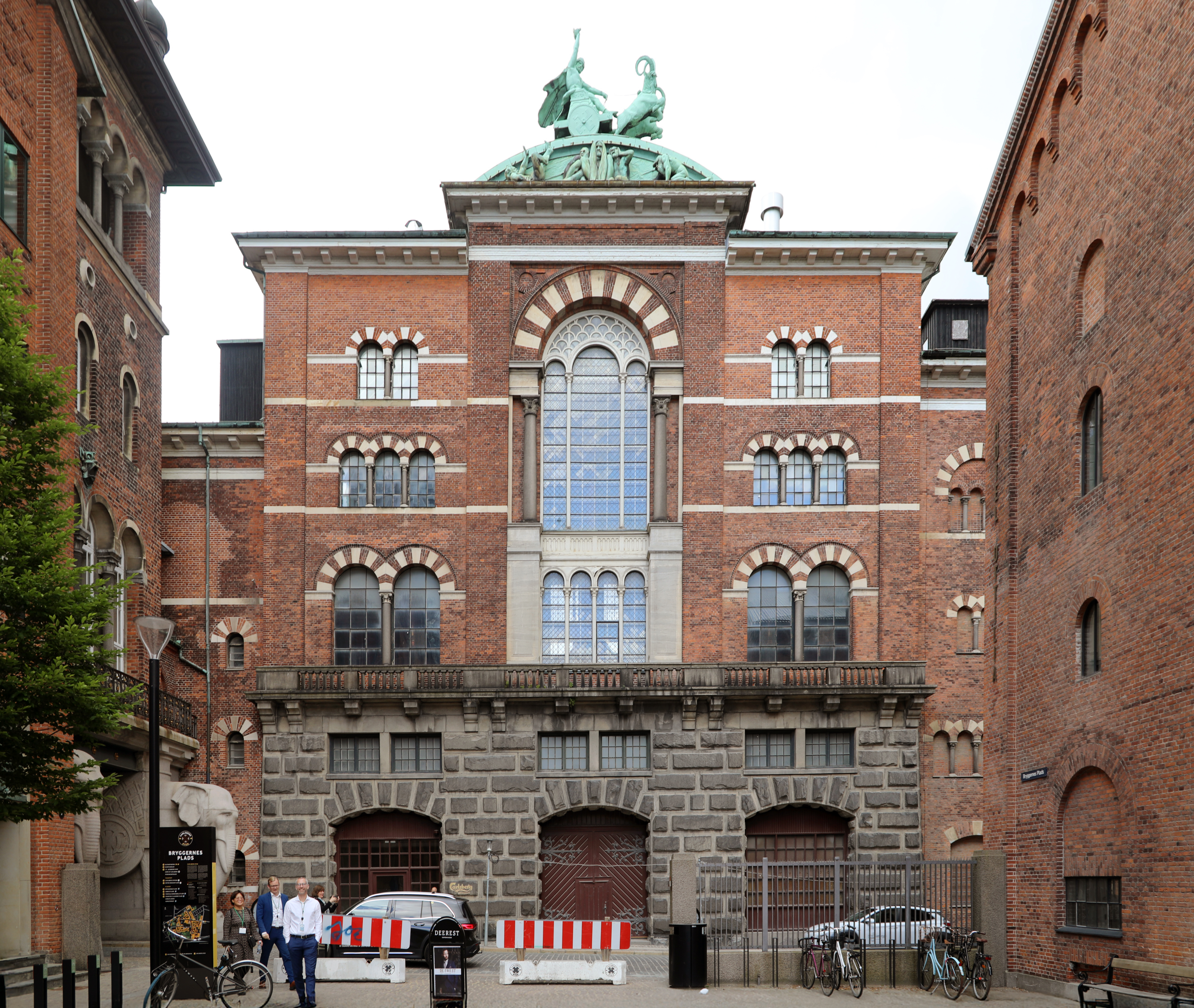
- Main facade
- Interactive map of the Ny Carlsberg Brewhouse area

General information
- Architectural style: Historicism
- Location: Copenhagen, Denmark
- Coordinates: 55.6674°N 12.5326°E
- Completed: 1901
- Client: Carl Jacobsen

Design and construction
- Architects: Vilhelm Klein; Carl Harild

The Ny Carlsberg Brewhouse (Danish: Ny Carlsberg Bryghus) is a historic, listed building in the Carlsberg district of Copenhagen, Denmark, on the border between Vesterbro and Valby.

== History ==
The Ny Carlsberg Brewhouse was built by Carl Jacobsen as the new brewhouse of his Ny Carlsberg Brewery which he had founded after a conflict with his father, Carlsberg-founder J. C. Jacobsen. It was designed by Vilhelm Klein and completed in 1901, replacing a smaller brewhouse still to be seen on the opposite side of the road. The new brewhouse complex also included a straw storage house to the east and a hops store with a yeast cellar to the west.

In 1920 the brewhouse complex was extended northward by Carl Harild and then altered in 1949 and 1965. Later, when the facilities became outdated, the buildings were put to other use. In 2006, Carlsberg decided to close the Valby brewery and instead redevelop the area. In 2008, the year beer production on the site was discontinued, the brewhouse became a listed building. In early 2011 it was stripped of its inventory and most of its furnishings to prepare it for other use.

== Architecture ==
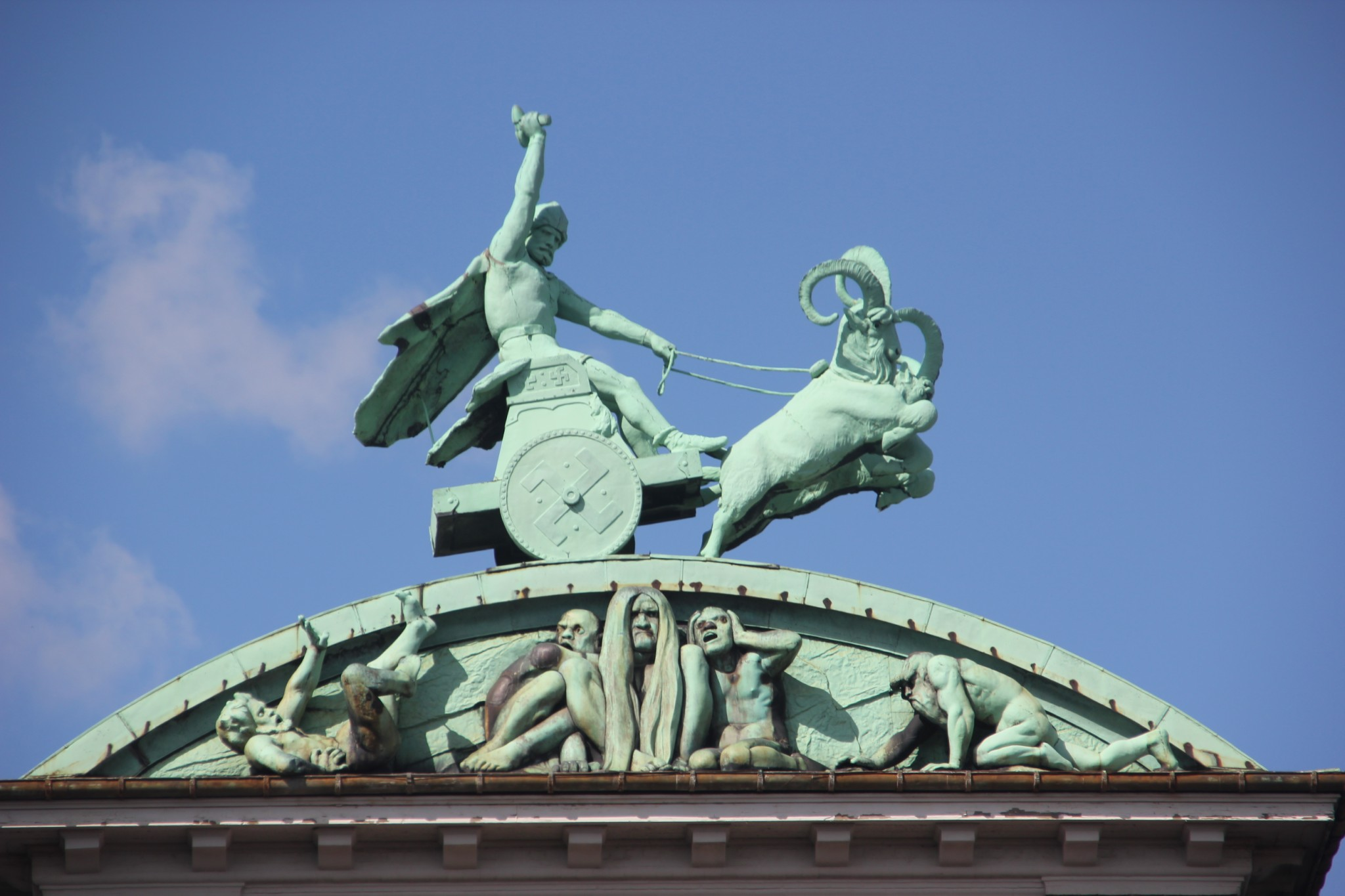
The Thor sculpture on the roof

The Ny Carlsberg Brewhouse is built in the Historicist style which also characterizes the rest of the Carlsberg area.

The main source of inspiration comes from Italian Renaissance architecture. The building's facade with its balcony is inspired by Palazzo Bevilacqua in Verona.

== Roof-top sculpture ==
On the roof stands Carl Johan Bonnesen's large group sculpture "Thor's battle against the Jötunns". The group of figures was originally a competition proposal for a monument at Langelinie which was won by Anders Bundgaard's Gefion Fountain. Carl Jacobsen subsequently asked Bonnesen to produce a copy for his new brewhouse.
