= Heinrich Hirschsprung =

Danish businessman (1836–1908)

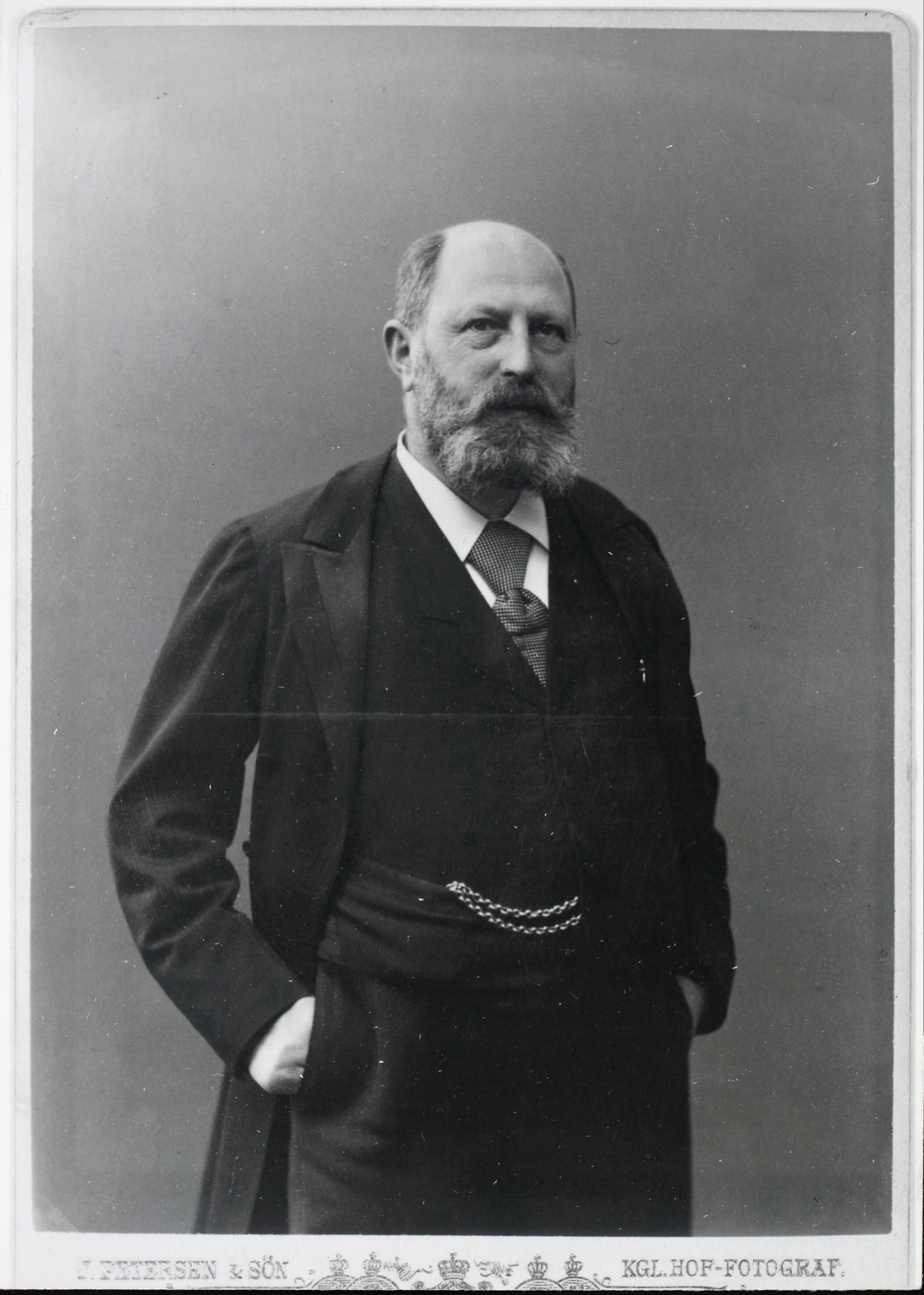
Heinrich Hirschsprung

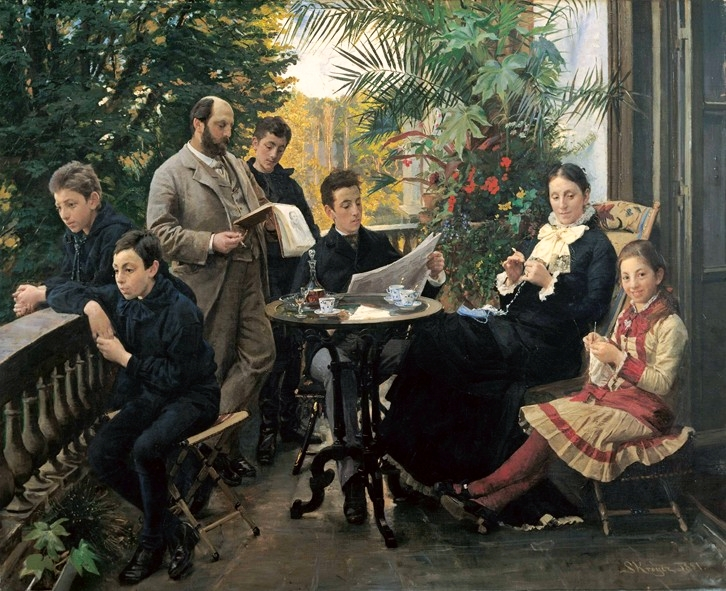
The Hirschsprung family portrait by P.S. Krøyer (1881)

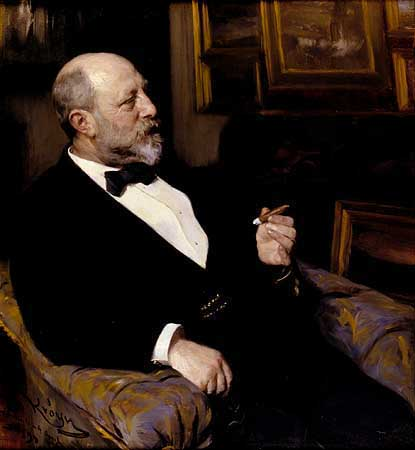
Heinrich Hirschsprung by P.S. Krøyer (1899)

Heinrich Hirschsprung (7 February 1836 – 8 November 1908) was a Danish tobacco manufacturer, arts patron and art collector most known for founding the Hirschsprung Collection in Copenhagen, a museum dedicated to Danish art from the 19th and early 20th century.

== Family and business life ==
Heinrich Hirschsprung was born into a family of German-Jewish descent in Copenhagen. His father, Abraham Marcus Hirschsprun (1793–1871), had been born in Friedberg near Frankfurt am Main in 1783 but moved to Denmark where he opened a small tobacco business in Copenhagen's Hotel D'Angleterre in 1826. Two years later, in 1827, he married Petrea Hirschsprung née Hertz (1804–1891), and they had six children. Hirschsprung's disease is named after their pediatrician son Harald Hirschsprung (1830–1916) who first described it.

Heinrich Hirschsprung and his brother Bernhard Hirschsprung (1834–1909) took over A.M. Hirschsprung & Sønner from their father in 1858. Under their leadership the business, now specializing in cigar making, grew rapidly. In 1866, they bought a piece of unused land at Gammelholm, an area which had been a naval site until 1859. There they built a modern factory for manufacturing cigars. It was designed by a young architect Ove Petersen (1830–1892) in a Historicist style which was inspired by Italian Renaissance architecture.

Heinrich Hirschsprung married Pauline Elisabeth Jacobson (1845–1912) on 26 June 1864; she was the daughter of wholesaler Daniel Simon (1791–1858) and Friederiche Jacobson née Gerhardt (1811–1855). Heinrich and Pauline had five children: Ellen, Ivar, Åge, Robert, and Oskar. They had their first apartment on Højbro Plads in Copenhagen and subsequently a house on Bredgade. They also had country homes in the north of Sjælland as well as in Italy.

== Art collection and artist friends ==
Hirschsprung began his art collection in 1866, with the purchase of a painting by Julius Exner (1825–1910). His collection expanded over the years with additional purchases of paintings by contemporary Danish artists. It was a modern collection of examples from the Skagen Painters, the Funen Artists, (Fynboerne) and Symbolists.

Hirschsprung was a great supporter, both personally and financially, of P.S. Krøyer who met him through Frants Henningsen, (1850–1908), a mutual friend at the Royal Danish Academy of Fine Arts (Det Kongelige Danske Kunstakademi). Hirschsprung admired Krøyer's artistic talent and skills, and he purchased his first paintings from him in 1874 — four watercolors from Hornbæk. They continued a lifelong friendship. Hirschsprung helped finance Krøyer's travels and foreign residence during the years 1877–1881, giving him the financial support needed to develop his artistic skills. Krøyer was a friend of the entire family. He continued a personal correspondence with Pauline and made a number of family portraits of Heinrich, Pauline and their children.

In addition to P.S. Krøyer, their homes were gathering places for other contemporary artists as authors such as Holger Drachmann (1846–1908), Herman Bang (1857–1912) and Henrik Pontoppidan (1857–1943) and painters Wilhelm Marstrand (1810–1873), Frederik Vermehren (1823–1910), Otto Bache (1839–1927), Kristian Zahrtmann (1843–1917) as well as Frants Henningsen.

== The Hirschsprung Collection ==
In 1902, Hirschsprung announced plans to donate his collection of art to the state. Heinrich Hirschsprung died during 1908 and was buried at Mosaisk Vestre Begravelsesplads in Copenhagen. The museum was established in 1911 by his widow Pauline Hirschsprung.

The Hirschsprung Collection (Den Hirschsprungske Samling) opened with 45 paintings, 13 pastels, 205 drawings, 14 watercolors, 12 busts, 55 sketchbooks as well as P.S. Krøyer's letters and documents. The collection has grown since then, and the museum continues to this day in a beautiful park setting near central Copenhagen, around the corner from the National Gallery (Statens Museum for Kunst).
