= Hirschsprung Collection =

Art museum in Copenhagen, Denmark

The Hirschsprung Collection
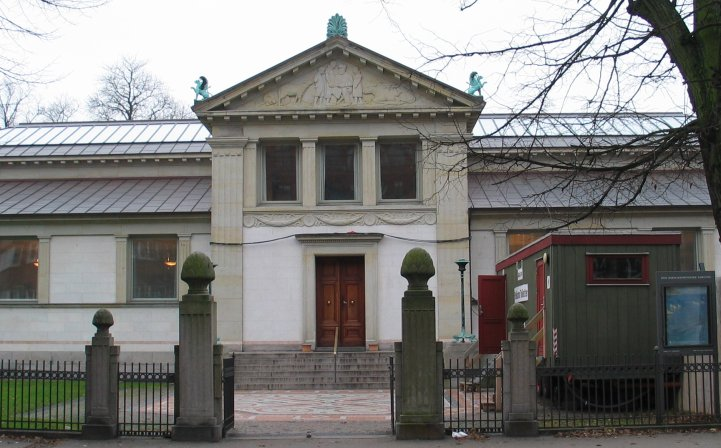
- Den Hirschsprungske Samling
- Interactive fullscreen map
- Established: 1911
- Location: Copenhagen, Denmark
- Coordinates: 55°41′24″N 12°34′39″E
- Type: Art museum
- Website: www.hirschsprung.dk

The Hirschsprung Collection (Danish: Den Hirschsprungske Samling) is an art museum located on Stockholmsgade in Copenhagen, Denmark. It is located in a parkland setting in Østre Anlæg, near the Danish National Gallery, and houses a large collection of Danish art from the 19th and early 20th century. The emphasis is on the Danish Golden Age, from 1800 to 1850, but also the Skagen Painters and other representatives of the Modern Breakthrough are well represented.

The museum is built around the personal art collection of Heinrich Hirschsprung, a tobacco manufacturer and patron of the arts who founded his art collection in 1865. Almost four decades later, in 1902, he donated it to the Danish state. It is displayed in a purpose-built Neoclassical museum building designed by Hermann Baagøe Storck and completed in 1911.

== History ==
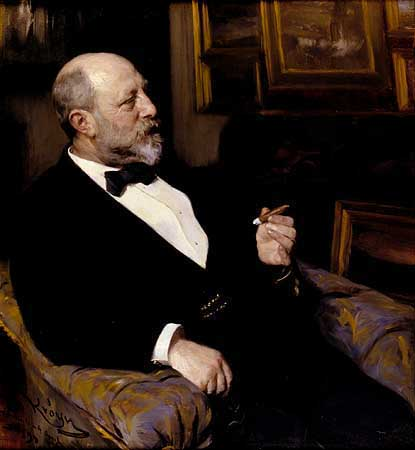
Heinrich Hirschsprung, the founder of the museum, painted by his friend Peder Severin Krøyer in 1899

=== The collection ===
Heinrich Hirschsprung was a tobacco manufacturer at A.M. Hirschsprung & Sønner. He was married to Pauline Hirschsprung, and the couple took a profound interest in the arts and counted many prominent artists of their day among their close friends, including the writer Holger Drachmann and the painter Peder Severin Krøyer, both associated with the Skagen colony. Over a period of four decades, beginning in 1866, Hirschsprung built an extensive collection of Danish art from the beginning of the 18th century and up to their own day.

The collection was shown to the public for the first time in 1888 at Charlottenborg. This happened in connection with the Nordic exhibition of Industry, Agriculture, and Art which was expected to draw many foreign visitors to Copenhagen. The exhibition catalogue included 313 items, representing some 60 Danish artists. About half were paintings while the rest were drawings, watercolours, pastels and some sculptures.

=== Planning of the museum ===
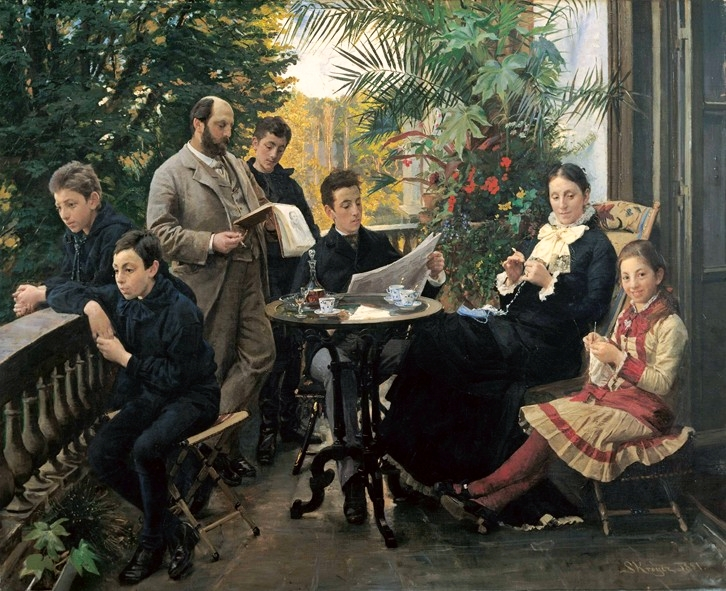
The Hirschsprung Family, by Peder Severin Krøyer

In 1900, Pauline and Heinrich Hirschsprung decided to donate their art collection to the Danish state. They had a deed of gift drawn up, which was deposited with the Danish Ministry of Cultural Affairs. The donation was not made public until two years later, in 1902, when the collection was once again exhibited at Charlottenborg. At the same event, the art historian Emil Hannover was put in charge of cataloging the collection. The exhibition at Charlottenborg also included renderings of the planned museum building, which had been designed by the architect Hermann Baagøe Storck. Disliking the Historicist style which dominated museum architecture in Copenhagen at the time, it was of critical importance to Hirschsprung that the collection be placed in an independent building built to a more "sober" design. He wanted the museum to stand on the ground left open by the now demolished ramparts around Copenhagen, where a number of new museum buildings, including the recently inaugurated National Gallery from 1899, had been constructed towards the turn of the century.

Under the terms of the deed of gift, the Danish state and the City of Copenhagen, on their side, were required to make a site and a building available for its exhibition. This scheme was similar to the one which had been agreed upon in connection with Carl Jacobsen's foundation of the Ny Carlsberg Glyptotek. Still Hirschsprung's demand for an independent building gave rise to a political debate on arts politics which went on for several years and put the plans on hold.

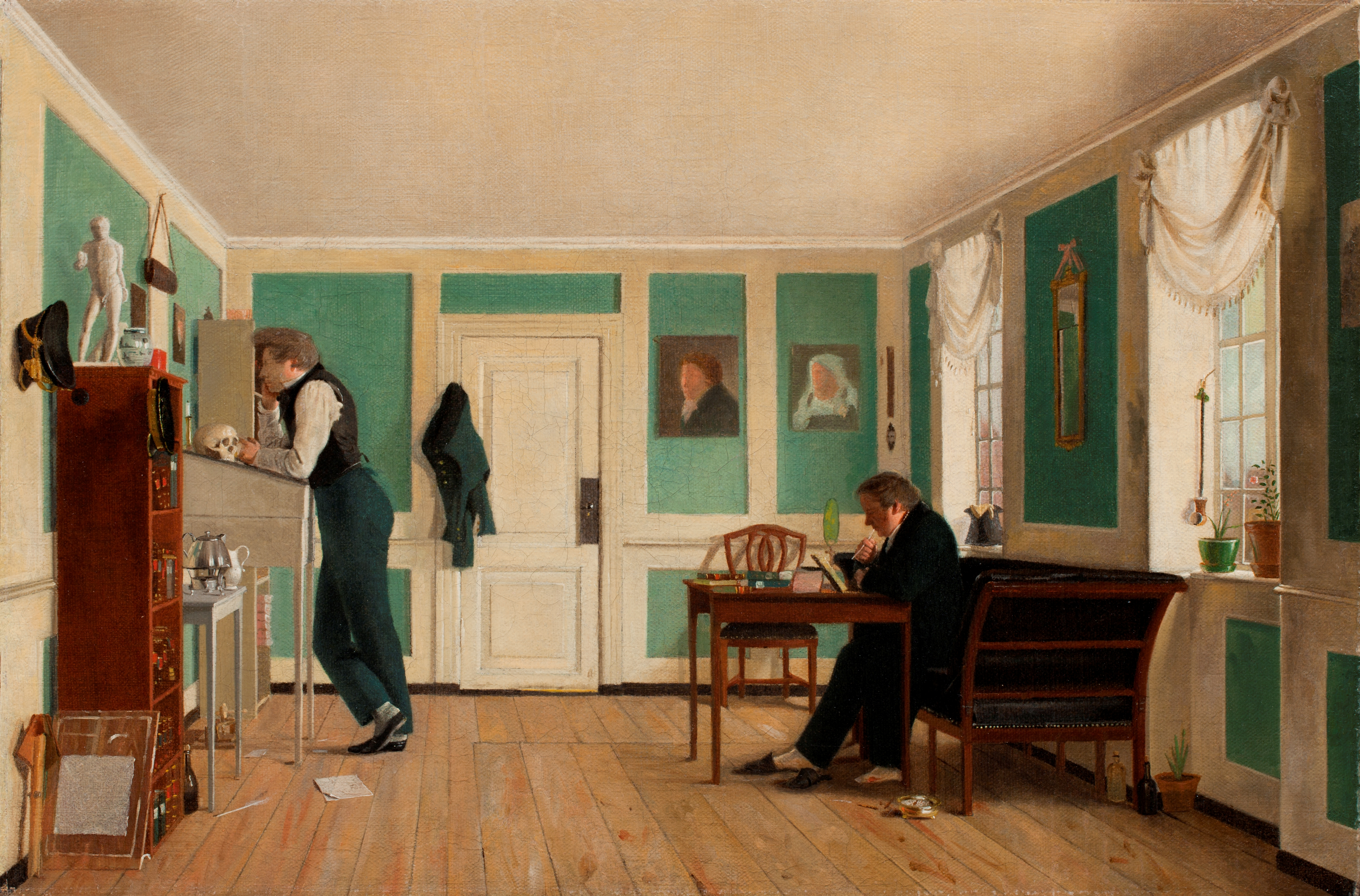
Wilhelm Bendz's Interior from Amaliegade with the Artist's Brothers from c. 1829 was acquired by Hirschsprung in 1901 but came into the collection only in 1915 after the vendor's death.

While discussions were going on, Hirschsprung continued to build the collection with acquisitions such as Joakim Skovgaard's cartoons for the decoration of Viborg Cathedral and a number of works by contemporary artists such as Michael and Anna Ancher and Vilhelm Hammershøi from the art collector Alfred Bramsen's Collection. A number of private individuals also promised to donate works to the collection once it passed into public ownership while others were purchased by Hirschsprung conditional on the same event.

To make the collection into a representative display of 19th-century Danish art, Hirschsprung also started to add sculptures to his holdings, using the sculptor and family friend Ludvig Brandstrup as an adviser. In less than a year, Hirschsprung managed to collect the great majority of the 180 sculptures included in the 1902 catalogue. The collection represents 20 Danish sculptors.

=== Construction and opening ===
1907 finally saw a successful conclusion to negotiations and a start could be made on building Storck's project from 1902. The site which was ultimately chosen was in Østre Anlæg, a park which had been laid out on the grounds of the city's former fortifications and where also the National Gallery had been built. Heinrich Hirschsprung died the following year, in 1908, and thus never saw his museum materialize. Emil Hannover, the art historian who had catalogued the collection, was charged with the interior design of the museum as well as curating the exhibition. He hung the paintings in chronological order, in the spirit of Hirschsprung.

The Hirschsprung Collection opened to the public in 1911. Pauline Hirschsprung was present at the official opening on 8 July, but died the following year.

== Building ==
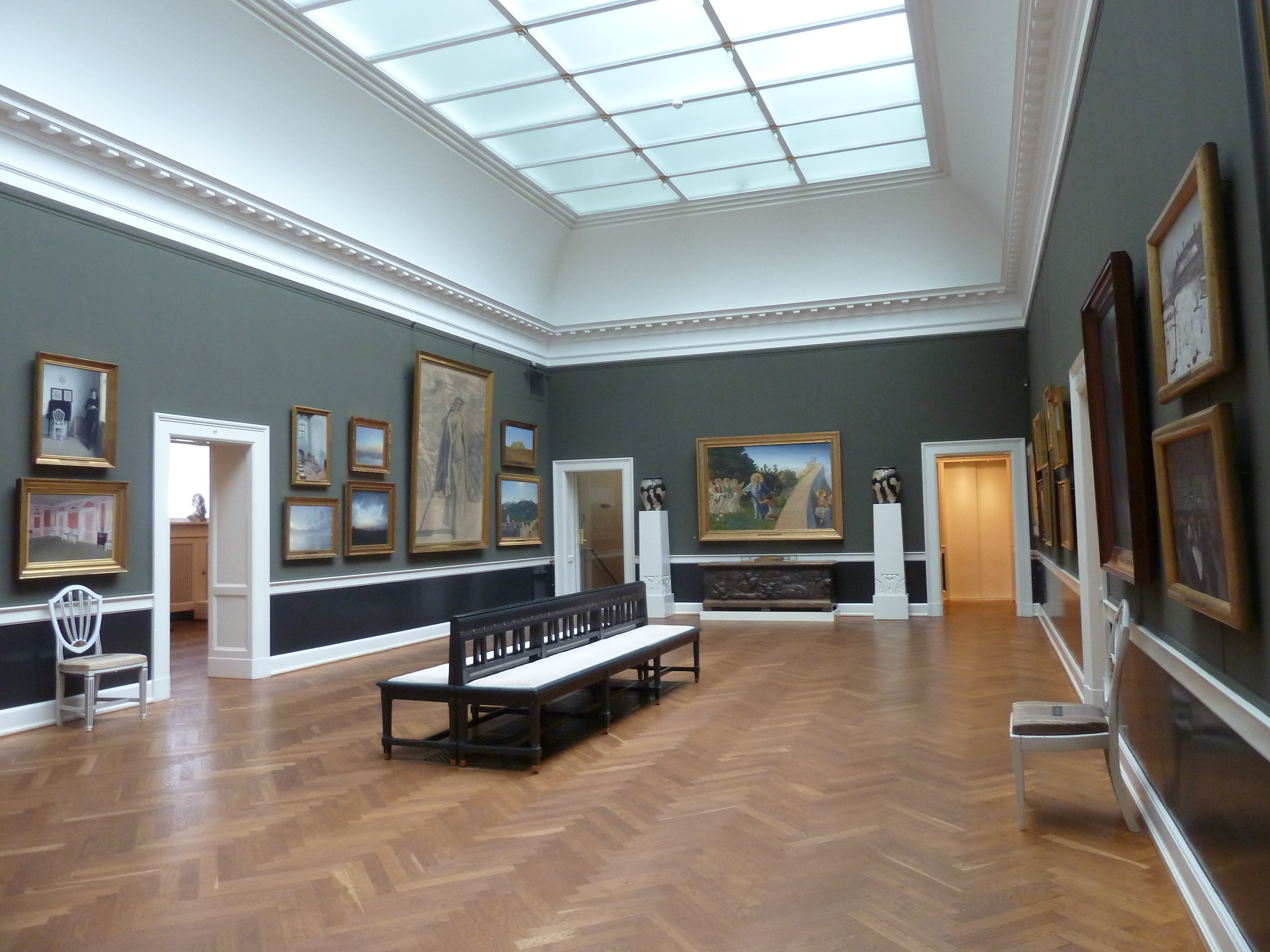
The large gallery

The museum building is a simple neoclassical building with a light marble cladding and a facade with pediments and Doric pilasters. The floor plan consists of four large toplit galleries surrounded by smaller galleries, "alcoves", with light entering from windows set high in the walls.

While the building from the outside has the appearance of a temple of art, the interior, with its small rooms, has the intimacy of a private home.

The entrance hall to the museum has a floor mosaic from 1910 by Joakim Skovgaard in which stylised tobacco plants commemorate the founder of the museum.

== Collections ==
=== Danish Golden Age ===
The museum exhibits more than 700 works of art. The emphasis is on the Golden Age of Danish Painting. All the major painters of the period are represented, including C. W. Eckersberg, Christen Købke, Constantin Hansen, Wilhelm Marstrand and Martinus Rørbye, as well as many lesser known names.

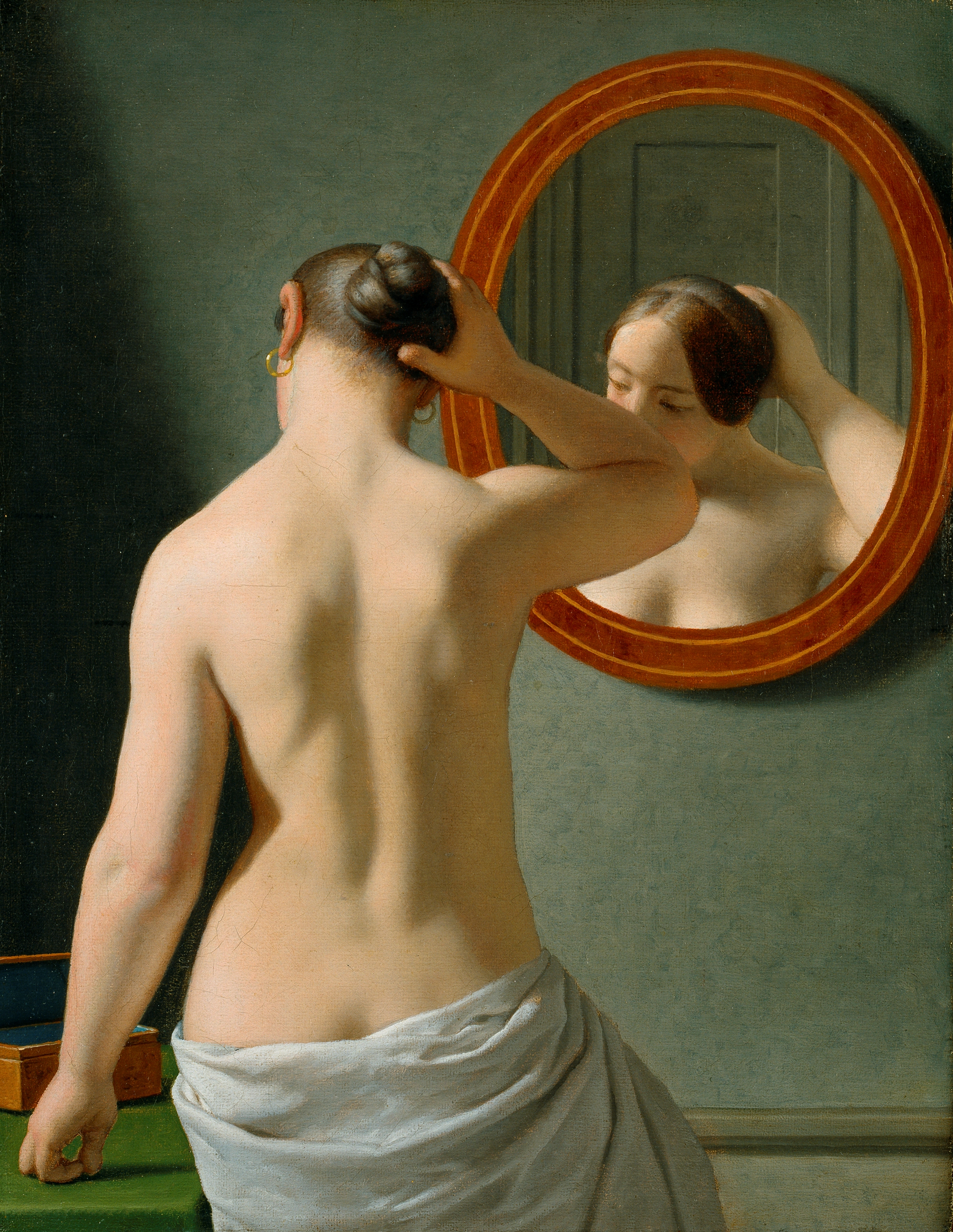
Christoffer Wilhelm Eckersberg, Woman Standing in Front of a Mirror, 1841

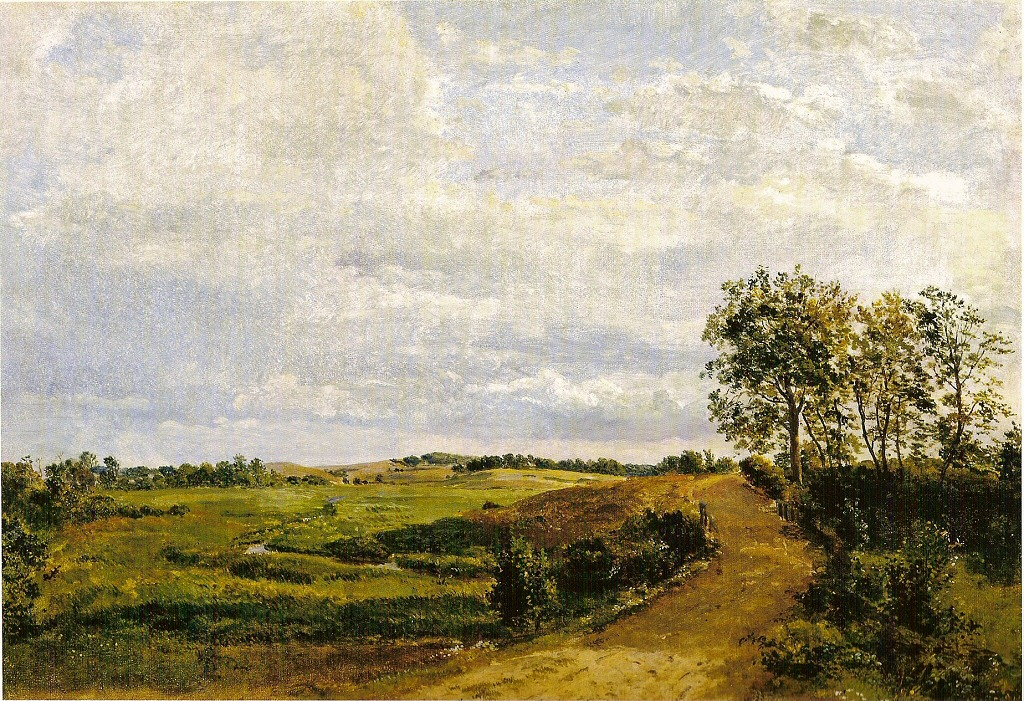
Dankvart Dreyer, Road across Hills, c. 1842

=== Modern Breakthrough ===
The artistic generation in the late 19th century, also known as the Modern Breakthrough in Danish painting, who broke away from both the strictures of traditional Academicism and the heritage of the Golden Age of Danish Painting, is also well represented. This includes:

- Skagen Painters such as P. S. Krøyer and Michael and Anna Ancher
- Theodor Philipsen, Denmark's foremost representative of Impressionism
- Symbolisterne, The Danish Symbolist movement
- Fynboerne, natives of Funen, a group of artists from Funen who met at Kristian Zahrtmann's independent art school in the 1880s.
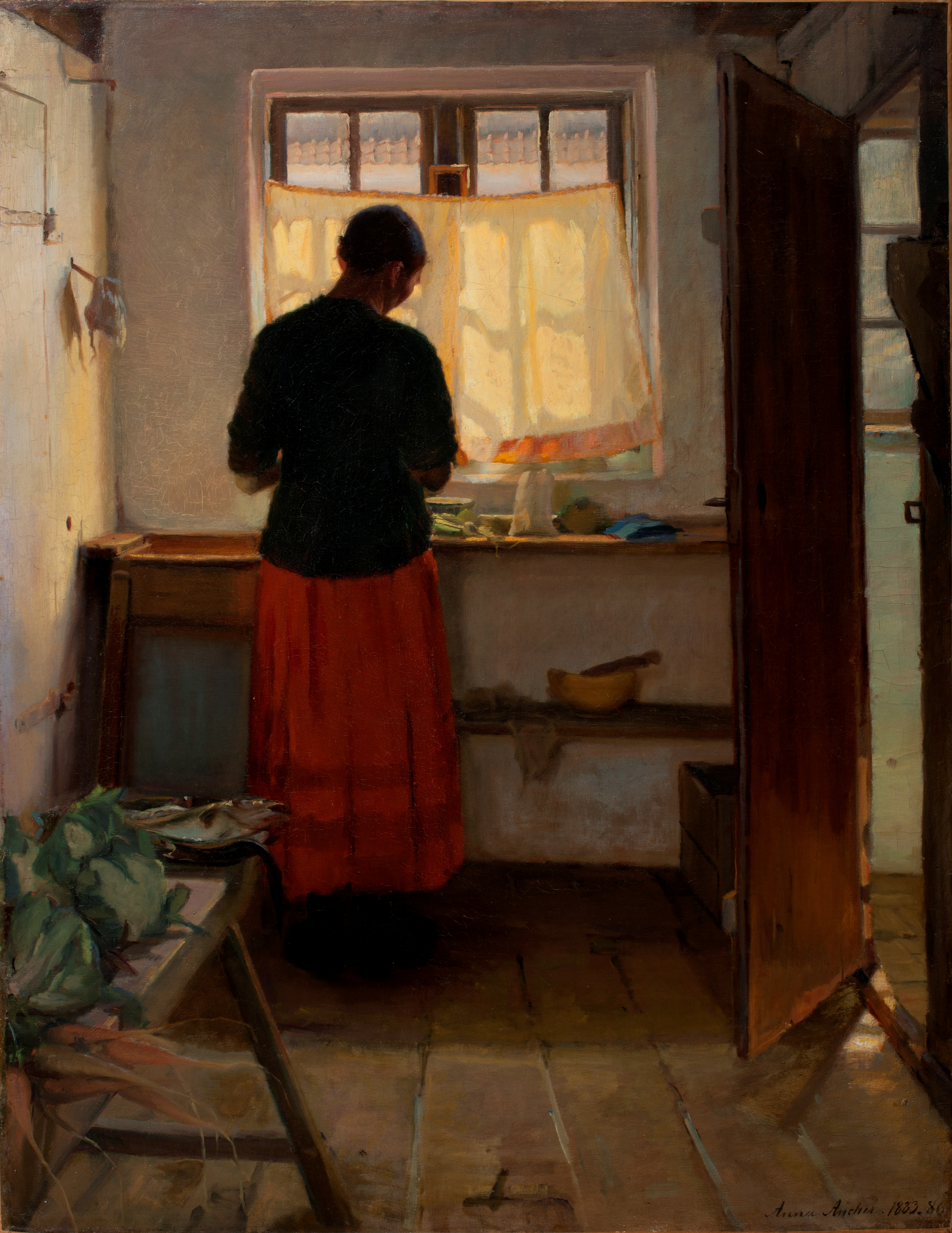
Anna Ancher, Girl in the Kitchen 1886

Summer Evening at Skagen Beach. The Artist and his Wife, P. S. Krøyer, 1899

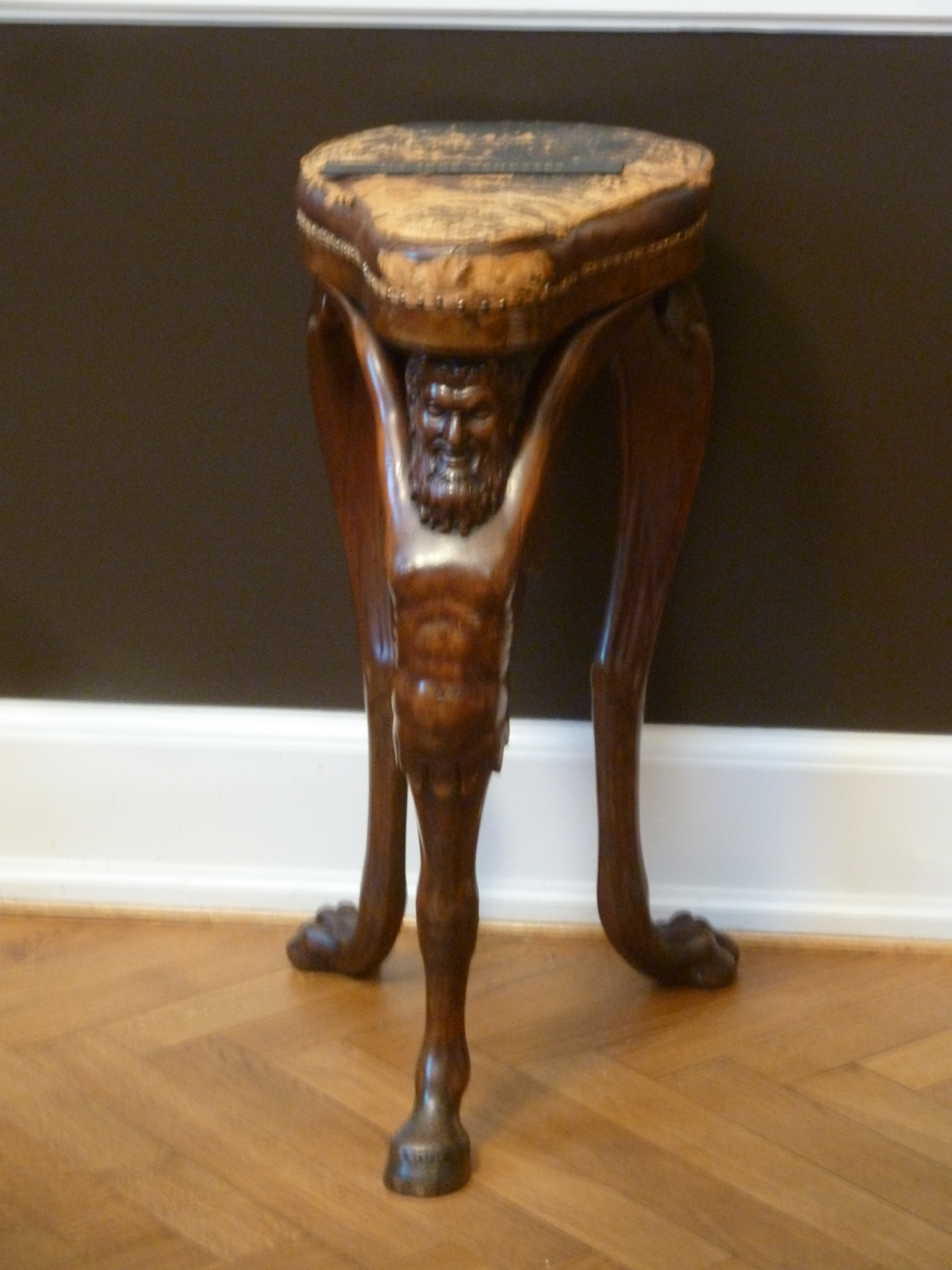
A stool in the collection

=== Provenance furniture ===
The smaller galleries of the museum are furnished with furniture designed by the Golden Age artists and other provenance furniture associated with them. This was done at the initiative of Emil Hannover, the museum's first director, when he was put in charge of interior design prior to its opening.

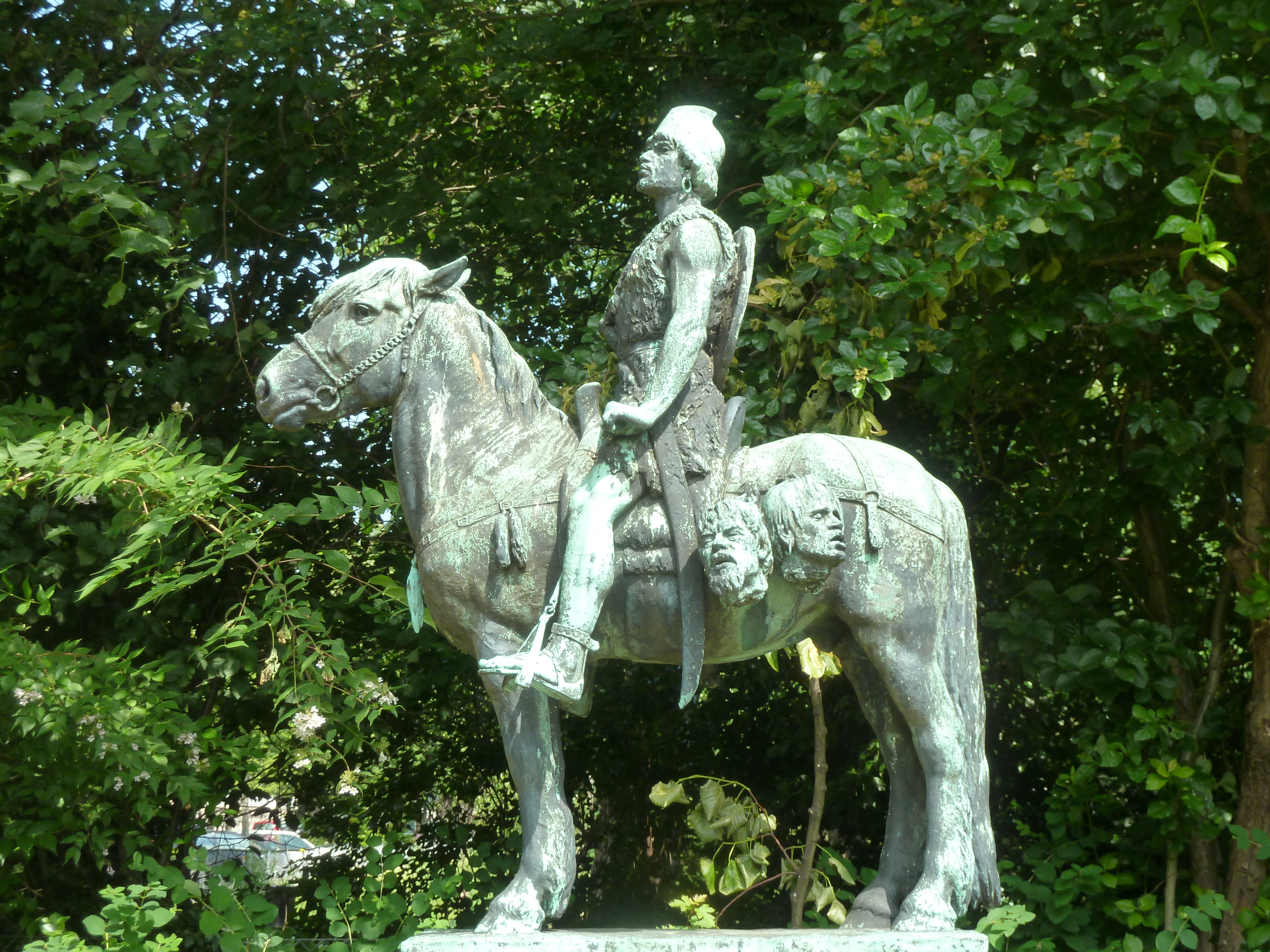
A barbarian

== Surroundings ==
There is a rectangular, cobbled space in front of the museum. On its left hand side, stands Carl Johan Bonnesen's equestrian statue A barbarian. A path to the right of the museum provides access to Ørsted Park close to the rear side of the National Gallery.

== Panorama ==
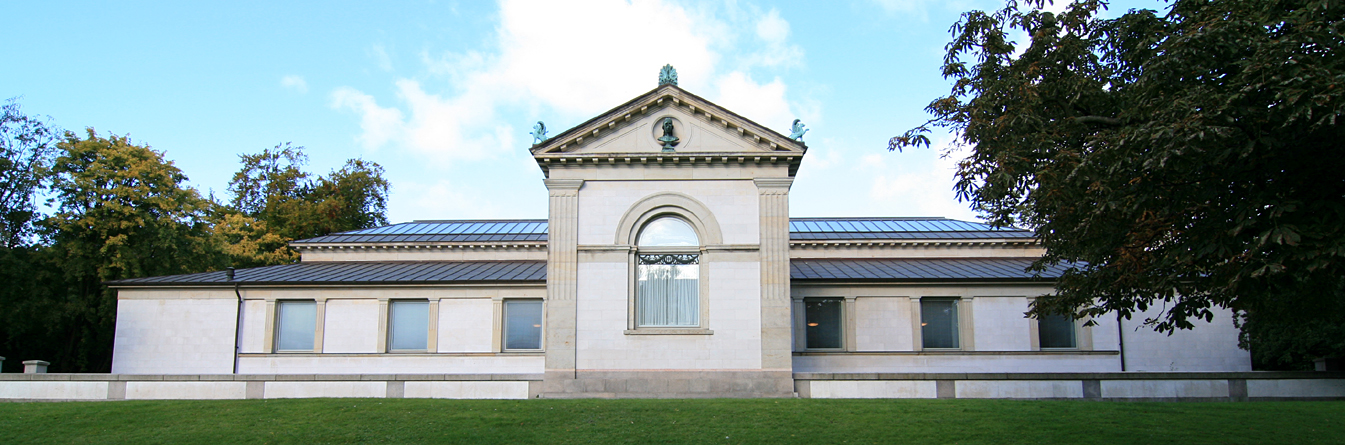
The rear of the museum building facing Østre Anlæg
