= Povl Bentzon =

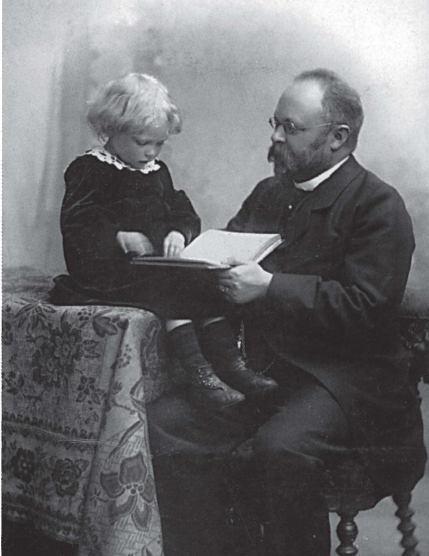
Povl Bentzon with his son Jørgen Bentzon, 1899.

Povl Bentzon (31 August 1858 – 9 February 1943) was a Danish engineer and land surveyor. He served as County Water Inspector in Copenhagen from 1894 to 1926. He was a co-founder of the Danish Engineers' Association and a member of its board 1892–97.

== Early life and education ==
Bentzon was born on 31 August 1858 in Copenhagen, the son of land surveyor Lars Larsen Bentzon (1833–93) and Christine V. Bang (1839–1902). He was the elder brother of Viggo Bebtzon.

He matriculated from Borgerdyd School in Christianshavn in 1877. He then enrolled at the College of Advanced Technology from where he graduated as a construction engineer in 1884. He passed the land surveuor's exam in 1885.

== Career ==
Bentzon joined his father's firm. In 1887–99, he planned a precision leveling arrangement in Copenhagen. After his father, in 1894 he took over the position as county water Inspector in Copenhagen county (until 1926) and as leading land surveyor for the operating national railways. (until 1920). In addition, he was a leading land surveyor for 155 railway, port and fortification constructions projects and an advisor to a number of Commissions, thus from 1895 leading land surveyor at the Valuation commission regarding the cession of land for waterworks in Copenhagen, from 1909 at the valuation commission for the cession of land for sewage systems, from 1898 member of the valuation commission for Frederiksberg (its chairman from 1902). He was chairman of the over-valuation regarding compensations in connection with reinforcement works around Copenhagen and member of the Gudenå Hydropower Commissions. From 1923 he was chairman of the Assessment Commission for Nature Conservation. During the First World War, the government greatly benefited from his organizational skills and assigned him the position of chairman of the fuel board 1917–20, where he oversaw the entire country's supply of domestic fuel.

Beentzon was also involved in organization work. He was thus a co-founder of the Danish Engineers' Association and a member of its board 1892–97. In the Land Surveuor's Association he was a board member from 1892 to 1908 and its chairman 1903–06 and 1920–24. In 1891–1900 and again in 1902–07 he was editor of the Journal of the Surveying and Land Registry Office.

== Personal life ==
On 7 October 1885 im Asminderød Church, Bentzon married Harriet Vilhelmine Drachmann (1861–1945). She was the daughter of medical doctor A. G. Drachmann (1810–92) and Clara J. Sørensen (1836–95). They were the parents of author Inger Bentzon, surgeon Povl Bentzon, surveuor Edel Bentyzon and composer Jørgen Bentzon.

Bentzon was insterested in art and music. He was chairman of the Rader Association in 1905–20. He is one of the men seen in Peder Severin Krøyer's monumental 1904 oil-on-canvas group portrait painting Men of Industry. He died on 0 February 1943 in Hornbæk.

== Awards ==
At the Land Surveuor Association's 50th anniversary in 1925, he was appointed an honorary member. He became an honorary member of the engineering association in 1942.

He was awarded the title of etatsråd in 1907. In 1899, he was created the Knight of the Order of the Dannebrog. In 1918, he was awarded the Cross of Honour. In 1923, he was created a Commander of the Second Class and in 1932 he was awarded the Medal of Merit.
