= Leaving the Table =

Painting by Laurits Tuxen

Leaving the table
- Man rejser sig fra bordet (Danish)
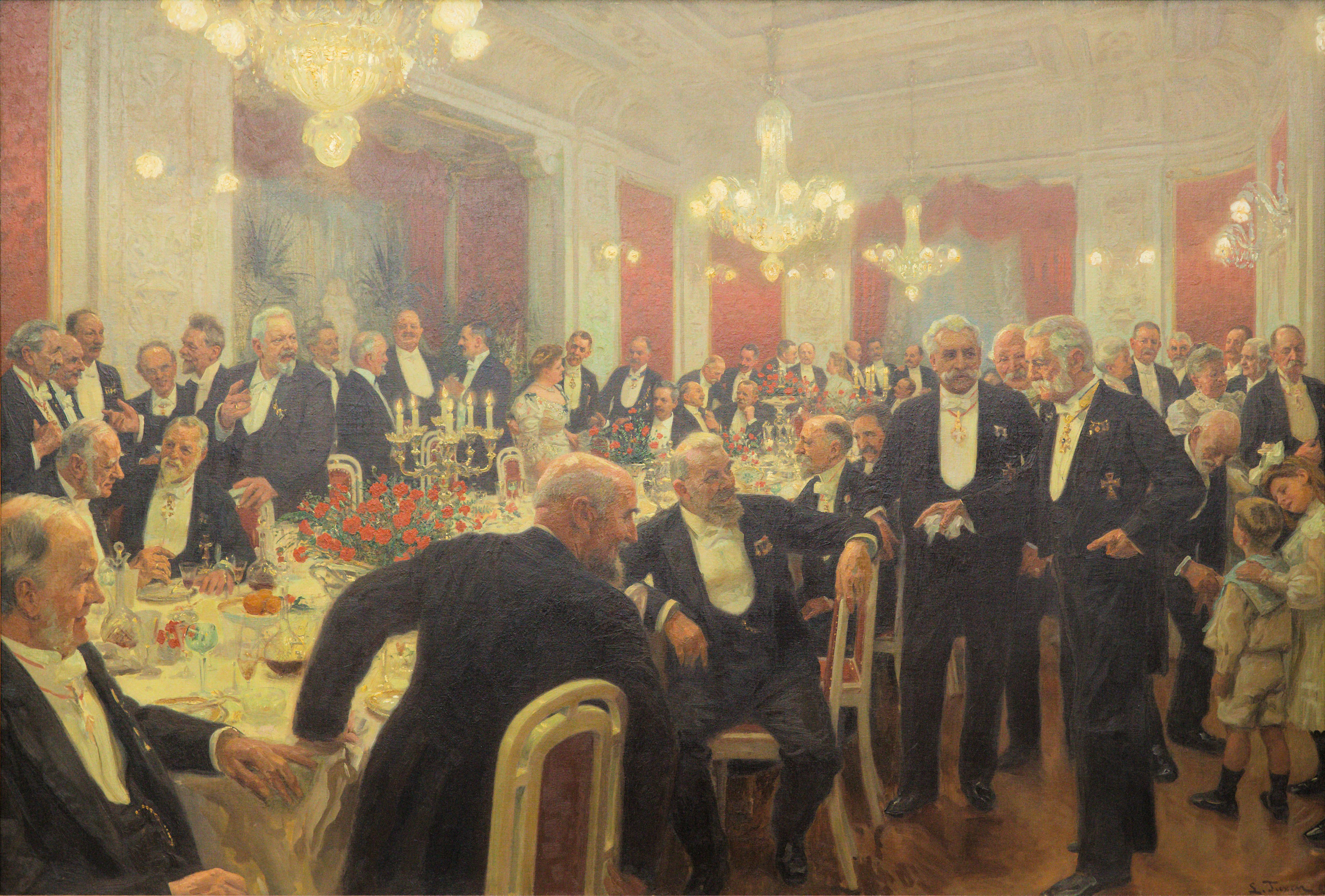
- Artist: Laurits Tuxen
- Year: 1906
- Medium: oil on canvas
- Dimensions: 142 cm × 212 cm (56 in × 83 in)

Leaving the Table (Danish: Man rejser sig fra bordet), also known as Dinner Party at the Morescos' (Danish: Aftenselskab hos familien Moresco), is a 1906 oil-on-canvas group portrait painting by Laurits Tuxen depicting a dinner party in Danish businessman Jacob Heinrich Moresco's home north of Copenhagen. The painting was a gift to Moresco on the occasion of the 50th anniversary of his firm. Many of the 45 people seen in the painting are well-known businessmen, politicians or other peers of the time.

== Background ==
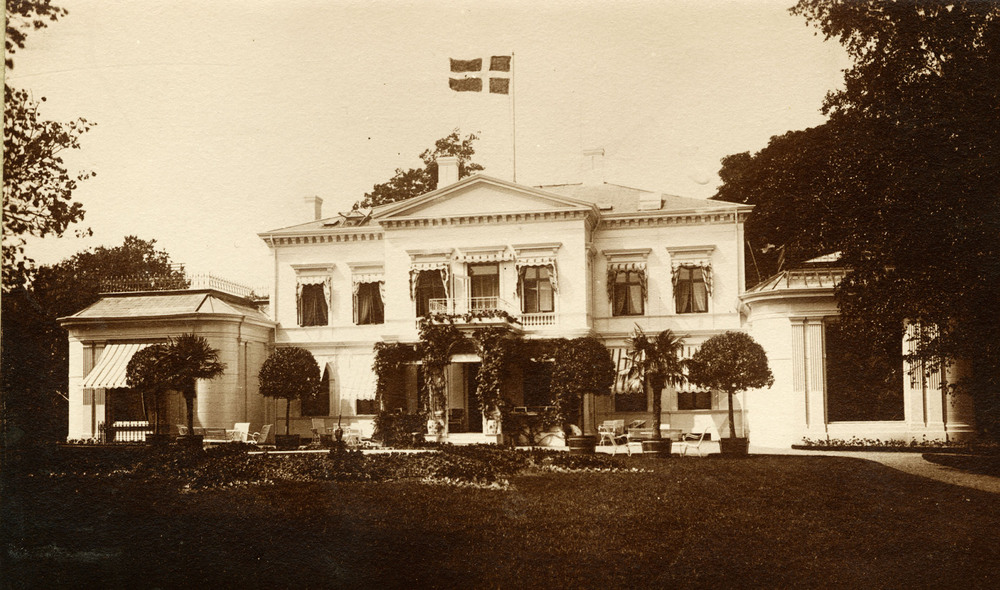
Moresco's country house Adelaide

On 16 April 1856, Jacob Heinrich Moresco opened a store with women's clothing and fashion accessories at Amagertorv 13. His firm would later develop into the first large-scale industrial manufacturer of women's clothing in Denmark. Moresco is one of the businessmen depicted on Peder Severin Krøyer's monumental 1895 group portrait painting From Copenhagen Stock Exchange in Børsen.

== Creation ==
Leaving the Table was commissioned from Lauritz Tuxen as a gift to Moresco on the occasion of the 50th anniversary of his company on 16 April 1906. It was painted on the basis of a black-and-white photograph taken at a dinner party some time before the anniversary. The dinner party took place in Moresco's home, Villa Adelaïde, at Ordrupvej 119, in Ordrup. The house was named after Moresco's mother. The property was acquired by Gentofte Municipality in 1943 and the building was subsequently demolished to make way for Ordrup Park.

== Provenance ==
Moresco died in October 1906. just a few months after the anniversary. The painting remained in the Moresco family for the next more than 70 years. On 23 April 1991, it was sold at a Bruun Rasmussen auction to Ole Abildgaard for DKK 480,000, then a price record for a Tuxen painting. The Danish Commission of Export of Cultural Assets (Kulturværdiudvalget) had the same year issued an export ban under the Act on Protection of Cultural Assets in Denmark (No. 332 of 4 July 1876). On 15 November 1995, it was sold at another auction, this time at Kunsthallen, for DKK 250.000. The buyer was by Kunstnyt.dk reported to be the Kolding-based businessman Christian Houe. He later moved it out of the country illegally and in 1997 sold it at a Sotheby's New York auction for US§ 84,000 (the equivalent of DKK 548,000). The buyer was New York-based art collector John Oden. On 22 October 2010, TV2 broadcastet a programme about the faith of the painting. In an interview with Oden, he stated that he had no intention of parting with the painting.

== People ==
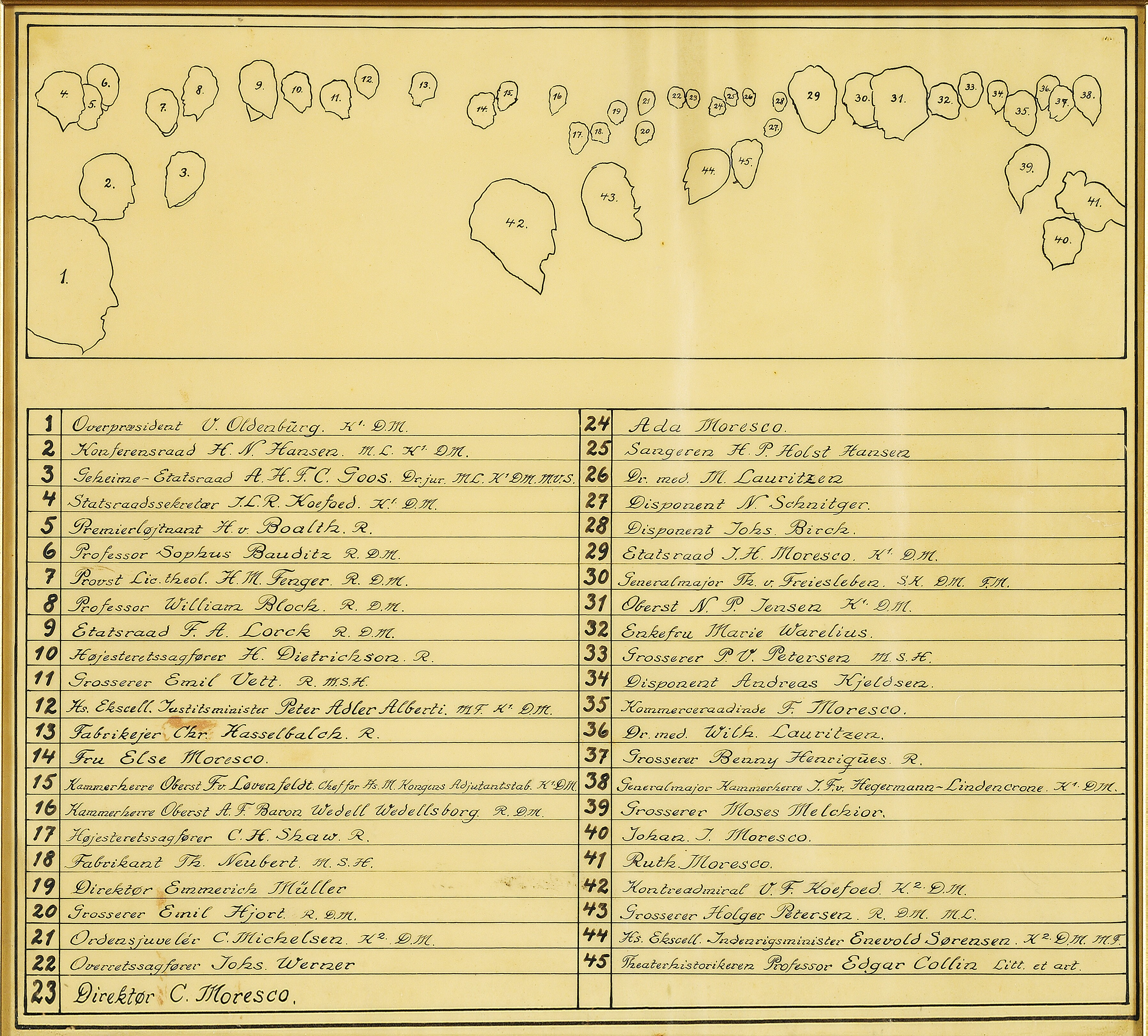
People in the painting
1. Valdemar Oldenburg (1834–1918), politician
2. Hans Nicolai Hansen (1835–1910), politician
3. Carl Goos (1935–1917), politician
4. J. L. R. Kofoed
5. H, von Boalitz, military officer
6. Sophus Bauditz (1850–1915), author
7. Hans Mathias Fenger (1850–103+), provost
8. William Bloch, stage director
9. F. A. Lorck, etatsråd
10. Harald Dietrichson (1851–1930), lawyer
11. Emil Vett (1843–1911), businessman
12. Peter Adler Alberti (1851–1932), politician
13. Christian Hasselbalch (1851–1925), businessman
14. Else Moresco
15. Friedrich Løvenfeldt (1841–1913), military officer and chamberlain
16. Vilhelm Wedell-Wedellsborg (1827–1914), military officer and chamberlain
17. Charles Shaw, lawyer
18. Theodor Neubert (1855–1911), businessman
19. Emmerich Müller, CEO
20. Emil Hjort, businessman
21. Carl Michelsen, Court Jeweller
22. Johannes Werner, lawyer
23. Carl Moresco (1863–1940), CEO
24. Ada Moresco
25. H. P. Holst Hansen, singer
26. M. Lauritzen, medical doctor
27. N. Schnitger, dispatcher
28. Johannes Birch, dispatcher
29. Jacob Heinrich Moresco (1829–1906), businessman
30. Theodor Freiesleben (1825–1906), military officer
31. Niels Peder Jensen (1830–1918), military officer
32. Marie Warelius
33. P. V. Petersen
34. Andreas Kjelsen, dispatcher
35. F. Moresco
36. Wilhelm Lauritzen, medical doctor
37. Benny Henriques (1829–1912), bookdealer
38. Fritz Hegermann-Lindencrone, military officer
39. Moses Melchior, businessman
40. Johan Jacob Moresco (1900–1981), Carl Moresco's son
41. Ruth Moresco
42. V. F. Kofoed, counter admiral
43. Holger Petersen (1843–1917), businessman
44. Enevold Sørensen, journalist and politician
45. Edgar Collin, journalist

== Related works ==
Tuxen painted a number of portrait studies of some of the people seen in the picture, including Enevold Sørensen (Kolding City Hall, acquired in 1920), Charles Shaw (Skagens Museum), Morescos, Marie Warelius, Emil Hjort, Johannes Werner and N. P.Jensen.

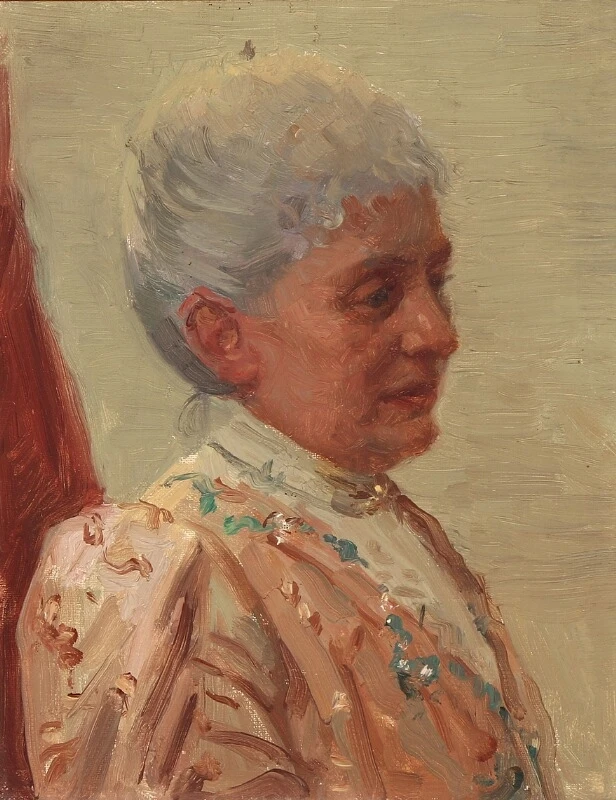
Marie Warelius

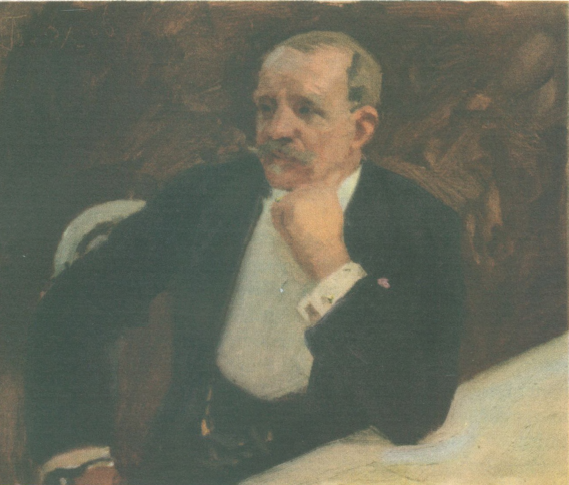
Emil Hjort

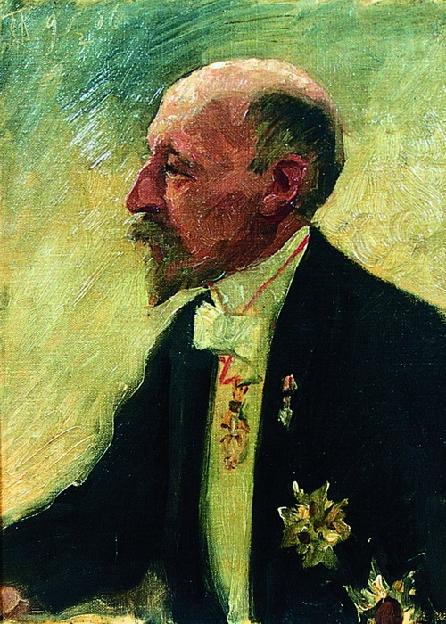
Enevold Sørensen

== See also ==
- Men of Industry
- The Hirschsprung family portrait
