= Gerhard Faye =

Gerhard Cassius Faye (8 March 1846 – 30 January 1917) was a Danish pharmacist and factory manager. He was one of the key figures in the emerging sugar beet industry on Lolland-Falster in the late 19th century.

== Early life and education ==
Faye was born on 8 March 1846 in Hobro, the son of customs inspector Ludvig Othar Christian Faye (1800–69) and Lovise Christine Jansen (1818–70). In 1861–65, he was an apprentice at the Swan Pharmacy in Aalborg. In 1865, he acquired the exam.pharm. degree. and spent one year at Brædstrup Pharmacy. He then continued to Copenhagen to continue his education, earning the Master of Pharmacy degree in 1867.

== Career ==
Feye spent the next five years back at the Swan Pharmacy in Aalborg. In 1872, he returned to Copenhagen to work at Carlsberg Laboratory. He was later the same year engaged as acting assistant at the University of Copenhagen's chemical laboratory, mostly for the crystallographer Haldor Topsøe. The very long hours in the laboratory made him give up his plans to study chemistry. In 1873, he was instead employed as private assistant at the Laboratory of Plant Physiology in the Jardin des plantes in Paris.

In 1874, Faye was employed as chemist at the new Lolland Sugar Factory. In 1877, he became manager of Højbygaard Sugar Factory. From 1882 until his death, he served as manager of Nakskov Sugar Factory.

== Written works ==
In 1916, he published Minder fra svundne Tider. He published numerous articles on agriculturalm statistical and economic questions, for instance in Landbovennen and Ugeskrift for Landmænd. In Aarsberetning om Maribo Amts økonomiske Selskabs Virksomhed 1912, he contributed with an article on the early years of Lolland's ugar industry.

== Personal life ==
On 6 June 1879 in Holmen Church, Faye married Louise Caroline Hagen (1851–1920). She was the daughter of businessman (grosserer) Edward Carl Hagen (1823–73) and Caroline Elisabeth Kirketerp (1825–61). The couple had three daughters and one son. The son, Aage Faye, who succeeded him as manager of Nakskov Sugar Factory, owned Øbjerggaard from 1913 to 1918 and Birkendegård from 1921 and until his death in 1949. It was as of 2021 still owned by his grandson Jørgen Faye.

Faye is one of the men seen on Peder Severin Krøyer's monumental 1904 oil-on-canvas group portrait painting Men of Industry. In 1907, he was created a Knight of the Order of the Dannebrog. He died on 30 January 1917 in Nakskov and is buried at Copenhagen's Western Cemetery.
