= Østergade 24, Copenhagen =

Building in Copenhagen

Østergade 24
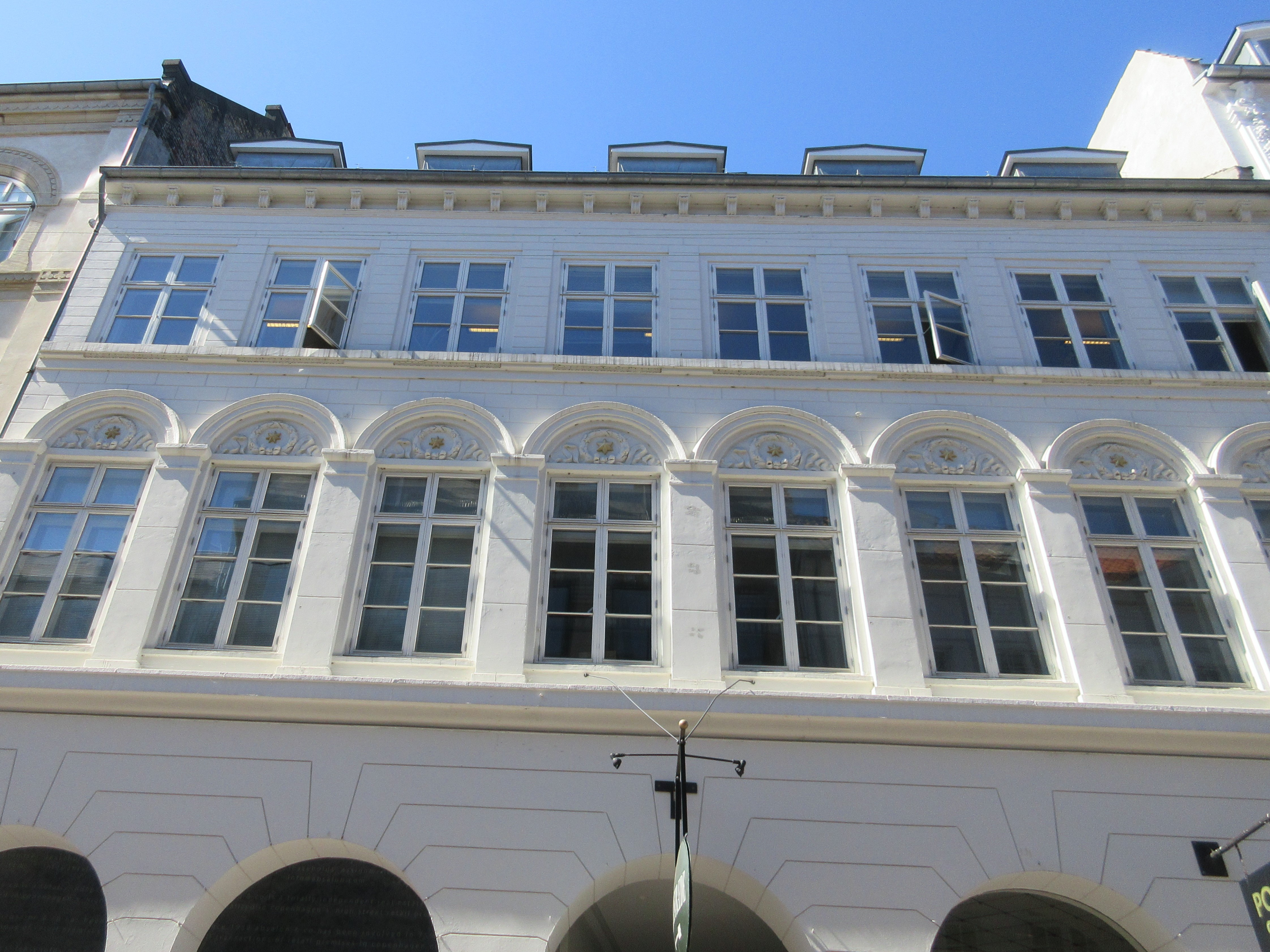
- Østergade 24 in 2023
- Interactive map of the Østergade 24 area

General information
- Location: Copenhagen, Denmark
- Coordinates: 55°40′47.7″N 12°34′59.0″E
- Completed: 11850

Østergade 24 is a mid-19th-century mixed-use building, with retail on the ground floor and office space on the upper floors, situated on the shopping street Strøget in central Copenhagen, Denmark. A gateway in the centre of the facade provides access to Pistolstræde, a passageway linking Østergade with Ny Østergade and Grønnegade on the other side of the block. Athenæum, a private library, was based in the previous building on the site. The present building on the site was constructed for Jewish clothing retailer Moses Magnus Ruben. It later served as headquarters of Jacob Heinrich Moresco's growing clothing empire from 1882. A photographic studio was for more than 120 years, from the 1850s until 1982, operated in the building, most notably by Peter Elfelt from 1805 until 1931. The building is today owned by Kirkbi A/S. Kirkbi's Copenhagen office is based in the building. The tenants include the fashion brand Gant.

== History ==
=== Early history ===
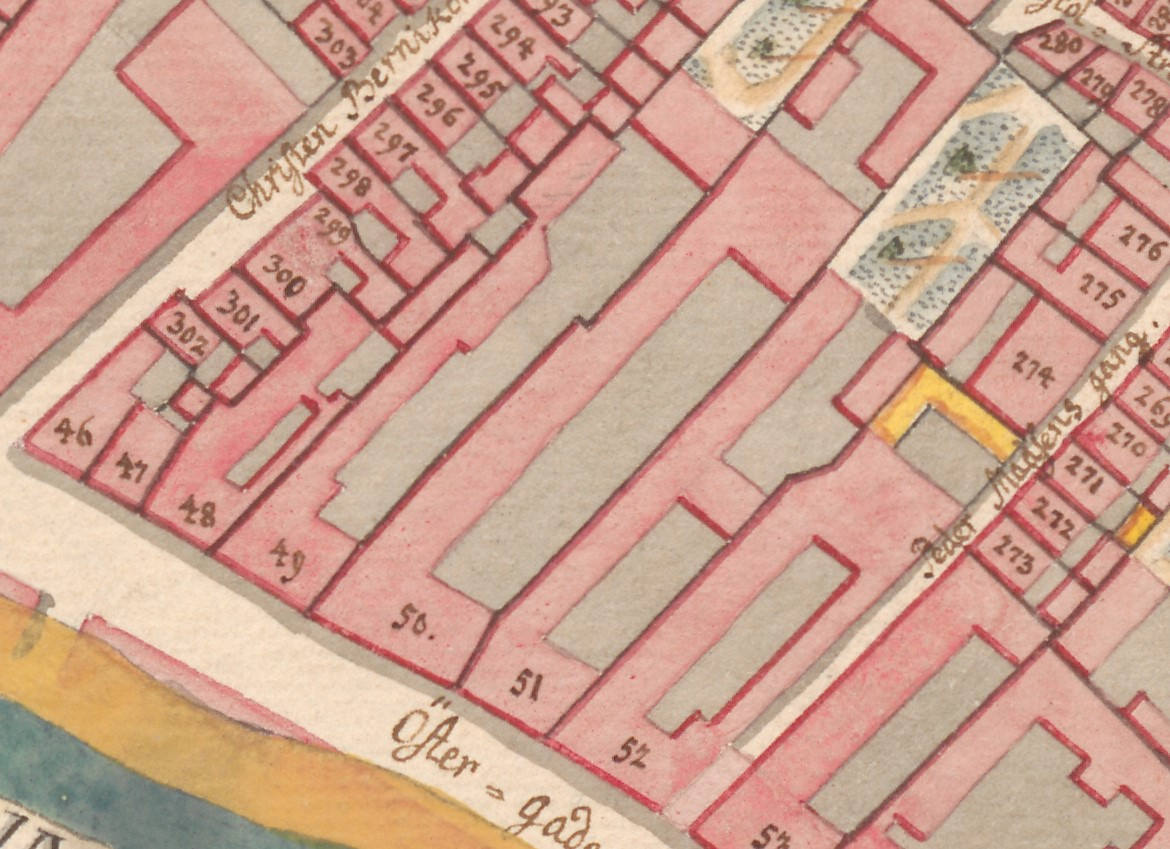
No. 50 seen in a detail from Christian Gedde's map of Købmager Quarter, 1757

A larger property on the site was listed in Copenhagen's first cadastre of 1689 as No. 50 in Klædebo Quarter, owned by Annike Rosenkrantz. In 1699, it was divided into smaller properties. The property now known as Østergade 24 was later acquired by Secretary of War Michael Numsen. He constructed a large Baroque-style town mansion on the site. His property was listed in the new cadastre of 1756 as No. 50 in Købmager Quarter. He was married to Margrethe Marie Thomasine Numsen.

=== Raben family ===
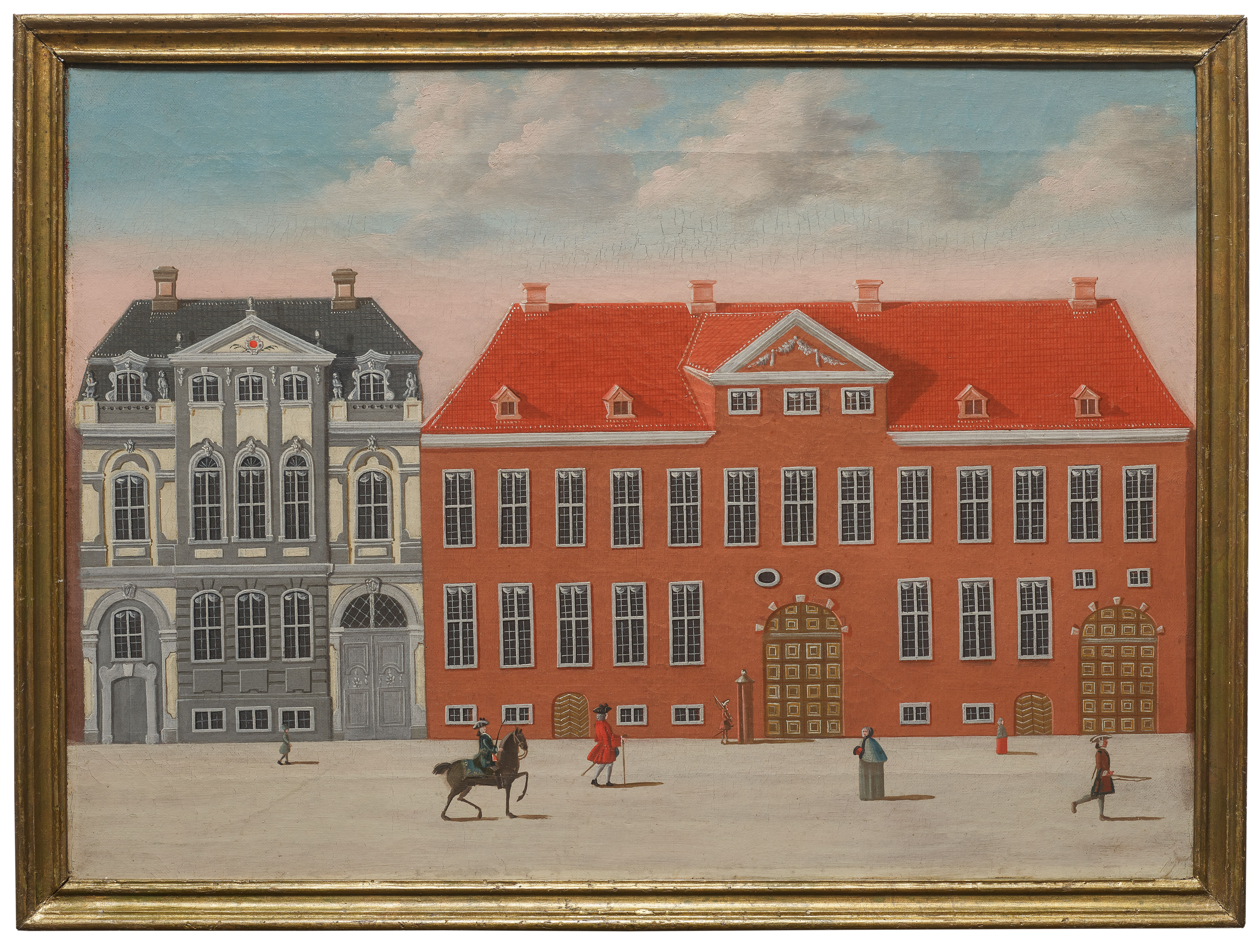
Numsen's building

The property was later acquired by geheimeråd Otto Ludvig Raben. The property was only registered with two residents at the time of the 1787 census. They were Raben's chamber servant Lars Juul and the caretaker Christen Thomsen.

The property was home to 27 residents in three households at the 1801 census. Raben was again not present. His son Friderich Raben resided in the building with the tutor Joachim Wilhelm Holm, coachman John Jørgensen, Jørgensen's wife Anne Cathrine Jørgensen, their two children (aged three and six), a caretaker, a gardener, a housekeeper and the housekeeper's four-year-old daughter. Christen Anker, a konferensråd, resided on the ground floor with his wife Hedevig Vegner, their four children (aged three to 16), one male servant and three maids. Peter Christian Møller, a flour merchant, resided in the basement with his wife Christine Hansen, their two sons (aged two and five), one male servant and two maids.

In the new cadastre of 1806, Raben's property was listed as No. 68 in Købmager Quarter.

=== 1840s ===
No. 68 was home to 35 residents at the 1840 census. Morten Hansen, a restaurateur/barkeeper, resided on the ground floor with his wife Marie Hansen (née Petersen) and their two children (aged nine and 10). Søren Rasmussen, a workman, resided on the ground floor with his wife Sophie Charlotte Rasmussen (née Petersen) and their three-year-old daughter. Ole Christensen, a pastry-baker (konditorsvend) and a male servant resided on the first floor. Anne Margrethe Rippersen (née Hvidt), a widow with means, resided on the second floor with two unmarried daughters (aged 20 and 25), one maid and two lodgers. One of the lodgers was the painter Niels Georg Grønbæk Rademacher. The Athenæum reading society was also based on the second floor. Sakari Jacob Svendsen, a grocer (høker), resided in one half of the basement with his wife Elisabeth Svendsen (née Weber), their 14-year-old son and one maid. Simon Ferdinand Mühlertz, a lace merchant, resided in the other half of the basement with his wife Ane Margrethe Mühlertz (née Petersen), their three children (aged two to eight), three seamstresses, a female cook and a maid. Christian Petersen, a ciachman (hyrekusk), resided on the ground floor of the reatr wing with his wife Mette Marie Petersen (née Rasmussen), their one-year-old son and two male servants.

At the time of the 1844 census, No. 68 was home to 39 residents in the side wing and another three residents in the rear wing (no residents are mentioned in the front wing). Carl Edward Fritzsche (1809–1873), a court glass merchant (cf. Kompagnistræde 12), resided on the ground floor with his wife Wilhelmine Fritzsche, their four children (aged three to 23), husjomfru Frederikke Tønnersbockand one maid. Georg Weisler, a master saddler, resided on the ground floor of the side wing with four apprentices. Theodor Brucke, a military physician, resided on the second floor of the side wing with his wife Marie Dorthea Brucke (née Rippurger), their five-year-old son, his widowed Ane Margrethe Elisa Brucke (née Ackermann) and one maid. Christiane Glæsner, a 69-year-old widow with means, was also resident on the ground floor of the side wing. Anna Margrethe Rippuger (née Hvidt), a widow, resided in the garret with her 25-year-old daughter Thomasine Regine Rippurger and one maid. Juliane Marie Amundsen (née Lund), a widow junk dealer (marskandiser), resided in the garret with her daughter Dorthea Hendriksen (née Amundsen). Marie Frederichsen (née Tellofsen), a widow needleworker, resided in the garret with her 18-year-old daughter Julie Christine Frederichsen. Johan Jacob Svendsen, a grocer (høker), resided in the basement with his wife Marie Elisabeth Svendsen and two maids. Simon Ferdinand Mühlertz, a fashion retailer, resided in the basement with his wife Ane Margrethe Mühlertz, their two children (aged two and seven), two female floor clerks and two maids. Christen Nielsen, a turner, resided in the rear wing with his wife ?? Nielsen F. Olsen and one maid.

=== M. M. Ruben, 1850–1880 ===
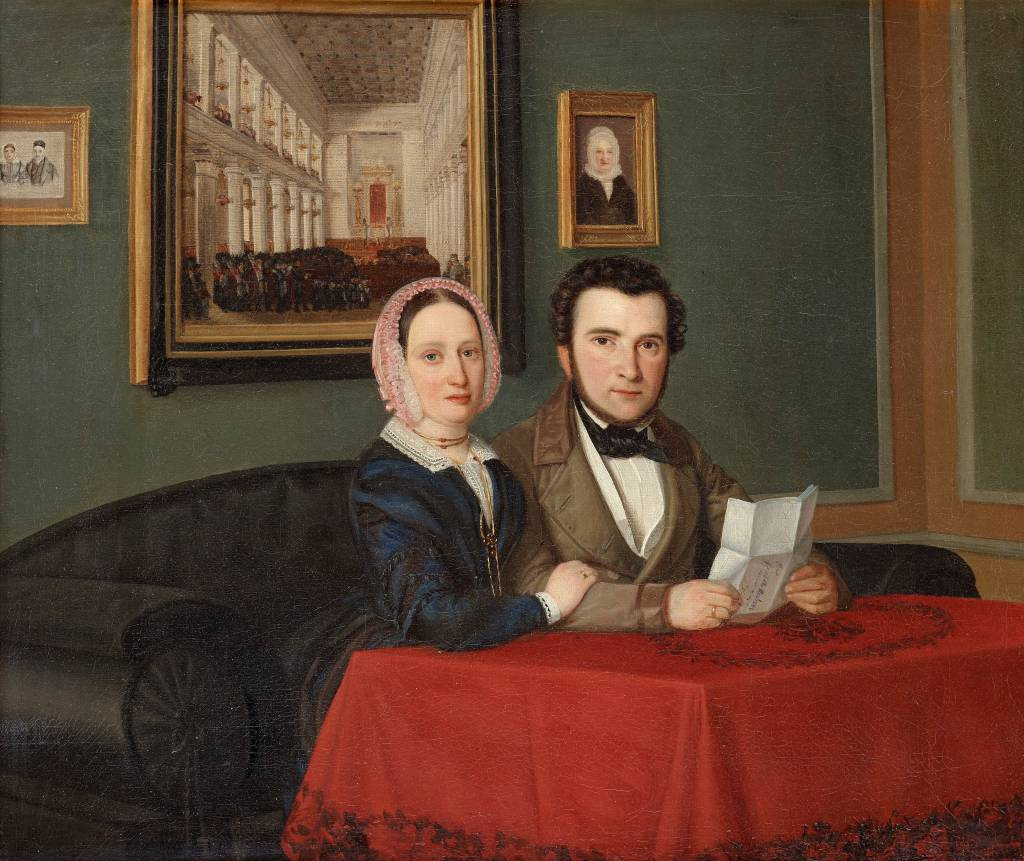
Moses and Hanne Ruben painted in 1847

In the late 1840s, No. 68 was acquired by Moses Magnus Ruben (1804–1870). He was originally from Helsingør. He had later moved to Copenhagen where he established a successful clothing shop at Østergade No. 31 (now Østergade 36). In an article in Politivennen on 2 GFebruary 1844, Ruben is mentioned as a "thorn in the side of the Tailors Guild, whose resentment has resulted in a series of lawsuits, all of which they have lost, and which has only expanded his trade even further.".

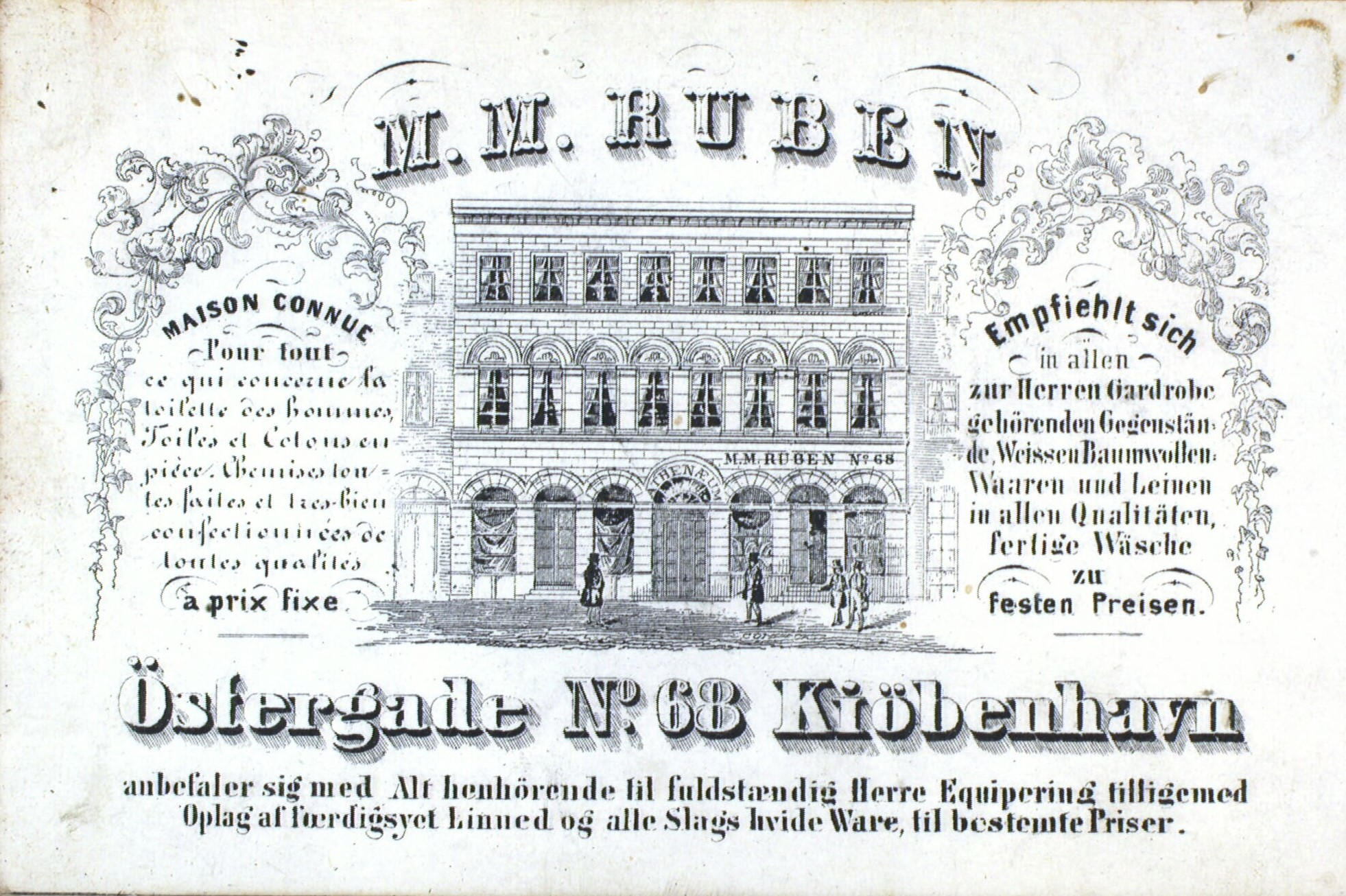
Advert for M. M. Ruben

Ruben demolished Numsen's old townhouse and replaced it with a new building. It contained an elegant retail space with tall, arched display windows on the ground floor and residential apartments on the upper floors and in the secondary wings on the rear. The new building was completed in 1850. It incorporated some elements from the previous building on the site. The building was listed as Østergade 24 when house numbering by street was introduced in 1859 as a supplement to the old cadastral numbers by quarter.

The property was home to 42 residents in seven households at the 1850 census. Moses Magnus Ruben resided on the ground floor with his wife Hanne Ruben, their five children (aged four to 17), his 15-year-old apprentice Julius Wolff, one male servant and two maids. Franz Emilius Martins, a grocer (høker), resided in the building with his wife Johanne Henriette Schou, their three children (aged two to five) and two maids. I. D. Schwiening, a shoemaker, resided in the building with his wife Laurentze Vilhelmine Schwiening (née Damm), their nine-year-old daughter, an apprentice and two maids. Johan Martin Scheuerlein, a smith (smedesvend), resided in the building with his wife Christiane Scheuerlein, their three children (aged one to 10) and one maid. Johan Peter Lund, a master saddler, resided in the building with two apprentices. Christian Nielsen, a horse driver (hesteudkører), resided in the rear wing with his wife Benthe Nielsen (née Olesen) and their two sons. Emil Frederik Gynther Lorenzen, a young silk and textile merchant, resided in the cross wing (mellembygningen) with his sister Hansine Petrine Valeria Lorenzen, two apprentices and one maid.

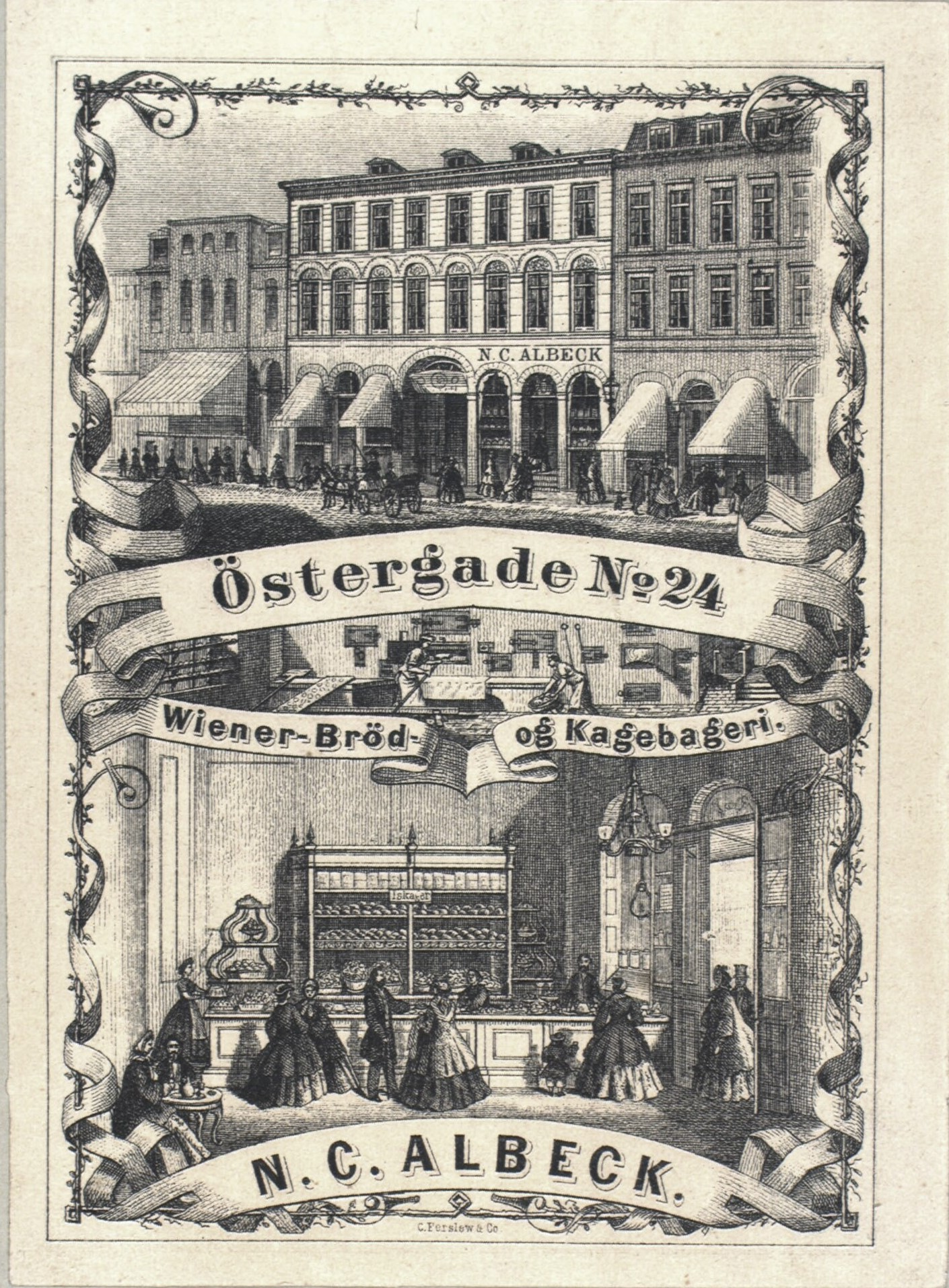
Advert for N. C. Albeck's Bakery

Ruben's property was home to 47 residents in eight households at the 1860 census. M. M. Ruben resided in the building with his wife Hanne Ruben (mée Eichel, 1807–1887), their three children (aged 17 to 24), one male servant and two maids. Anna Maria Jordening (née Birch), a widow porcelain retailer, resided in the building with her six children (aged four to 19), a maid and a nanny. Georg Ludvig Drimor, am ironmonger (issenlræmmer), resided in the building with two employees and an apprentice. C. A. Martens, a glovemaker, resided in the building with his wife Marie Martens, their two sons (aged one and four), an apprentice and a maid. Carl T. Thomsen, a butler (lejetjener), resided in the building with his wife Marn?? Thomsen and one maid. Niels Petersen, a master tailer, resided in the building with his wife Johanne Petersen, their eight-year-old daughter and one maid. Werner Lassen (1822–18855), a piano manufacturer, resided in the building with his wife Emilie Lassen, their three children (aged one to five) and one maid. Rasmus Andersen, a haulier, resided in the building with his wife Caroline Andersen, three male servants and one maid.

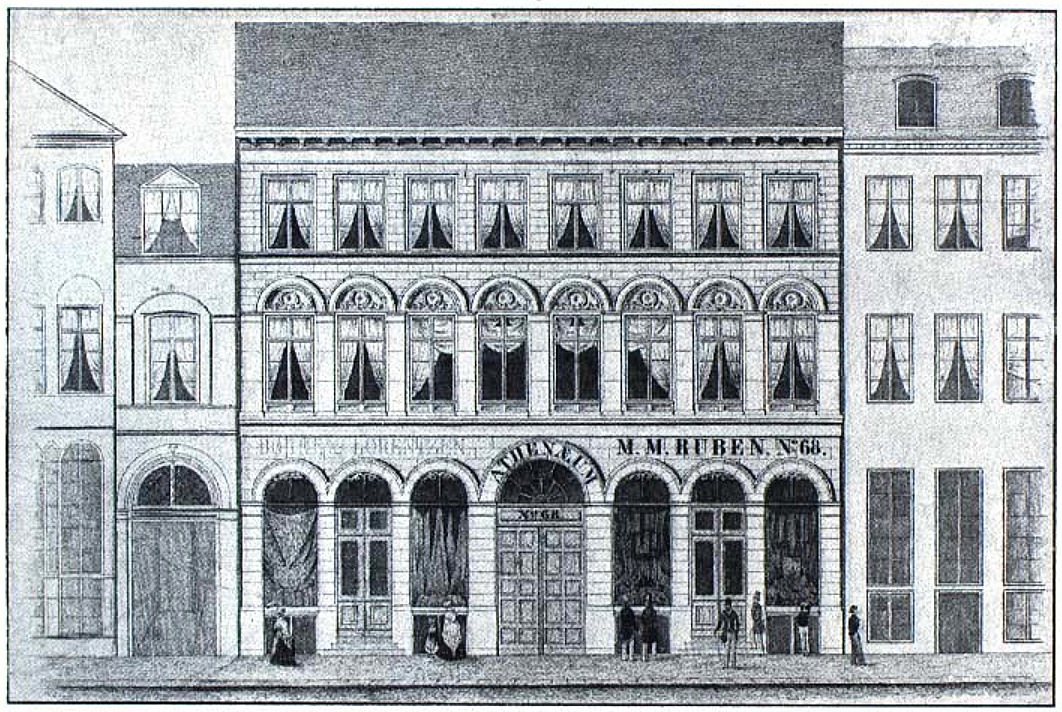
Drawing of the building

Verner Lassen's pianio workshop was (later) based next door at Østergade 26.

Moses Magnus Ruben died in 1870. Hanne Ruben kept the property for another ten years. N. C. Albeck opened a bakery on the ground floor. In 1878, No. 68 (Østergade 24) was merged with No. 288 (Grønnegade 10/Pilestræde 12) on the other side of the block.

=== J. Moresco ===
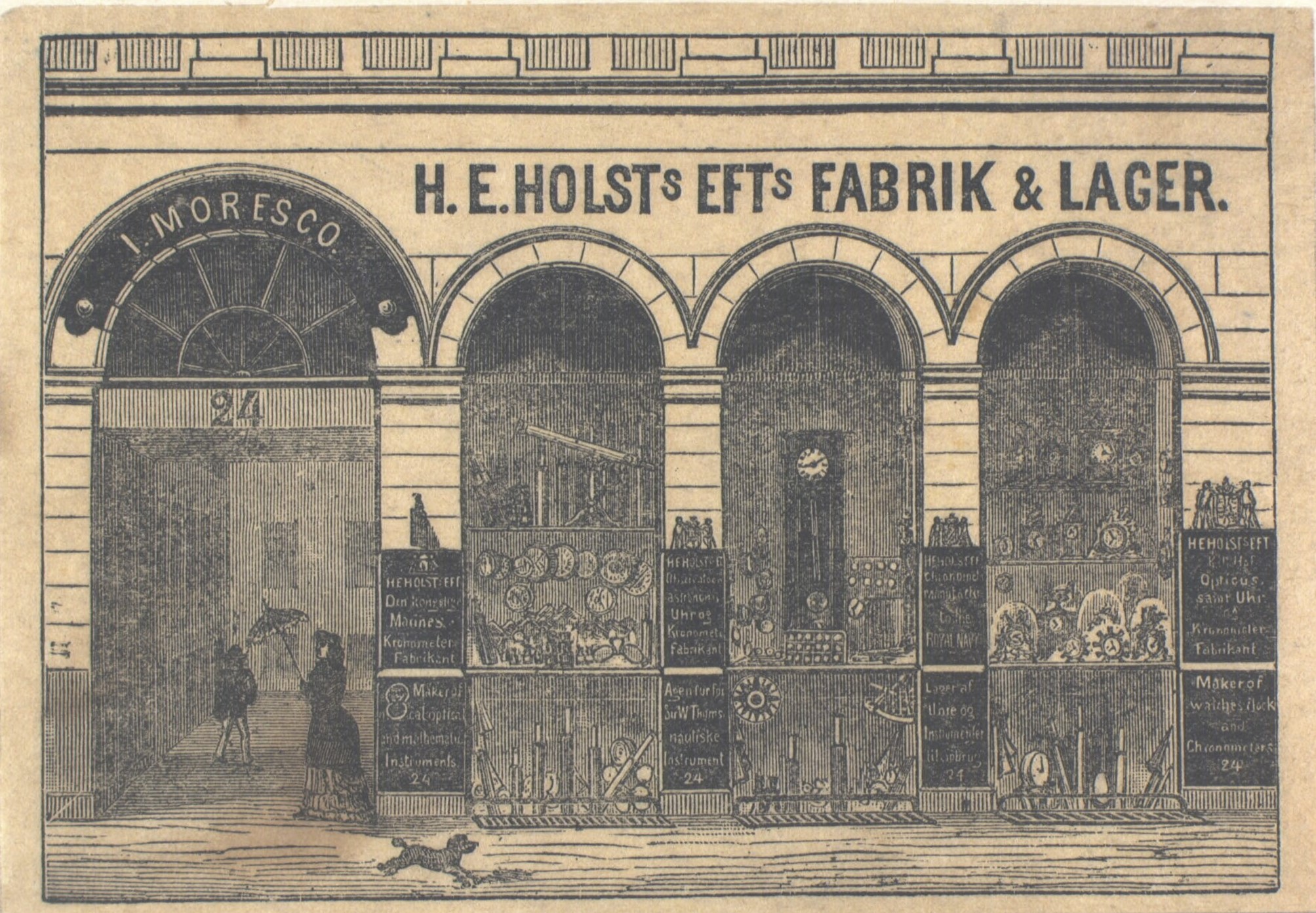
J. Moresco: H. G. Golst's successor, factory & outlet

In 1880, Jacob Heinrich Moresco purchased the property. He had for many years operated a clothing shop on Amagertorv. He undertook a comprehensive renocation of the building. In 1882, his company relocated to the building in Østergade. After a few years, J. Moresco had developed into the largest manufacturer of women's clothing in the Nordic countries with considerable export to Southern Sweden and Norway. When Sweden increased its tariffs on clothing from Denmark in 1890, Moresco responded by establishing a Swedish subsidiary, aAB Moresco, in Malmö, followed by a Norwegian subsidiary in Christiania in 1897.

In 1895, No. 68 & 288 was merged with No. 311 (Pistolstræde 8).

Jacob Heinrich Moresco died in 1905. The company was after his death continued by his nephew Carl Morescp. J. Moresco was headquartered in the building until at least 1915.

In 1953, the property's cadastral number was shortened from No. 68, 288 & 311 to simply No. 68. In 1993, Pistolstræde 3 was sold off (as No. 395).

=== Photographic studios ===
In 1853, E. Lange established a photographic studio in the building. In 1856, it was taken over by Emil Lange in 1854. In 1863-1882, it was continued as E. Langes Efterf, by Carl H. L. Diedrich, In 1884, it was taken over by Johan Chrone. In 1888, he continued the operations with a partner as Johan Chrone & Schnitger. It is unclear who operated the photographic studio from 1786 until 1905.

In 1005, Peter Elfelt's photographic studio relocated to the building. He died in 1931. Elfelt's studio was after his death continued as Peter Elfelts Efterfølger by Elisabeth Weile (née Christensen) until 1971. It was then continued first by Poul Johansen until 1973 and then by his daughter Anne-Lise of Schaumburg-Lippe until 1982.

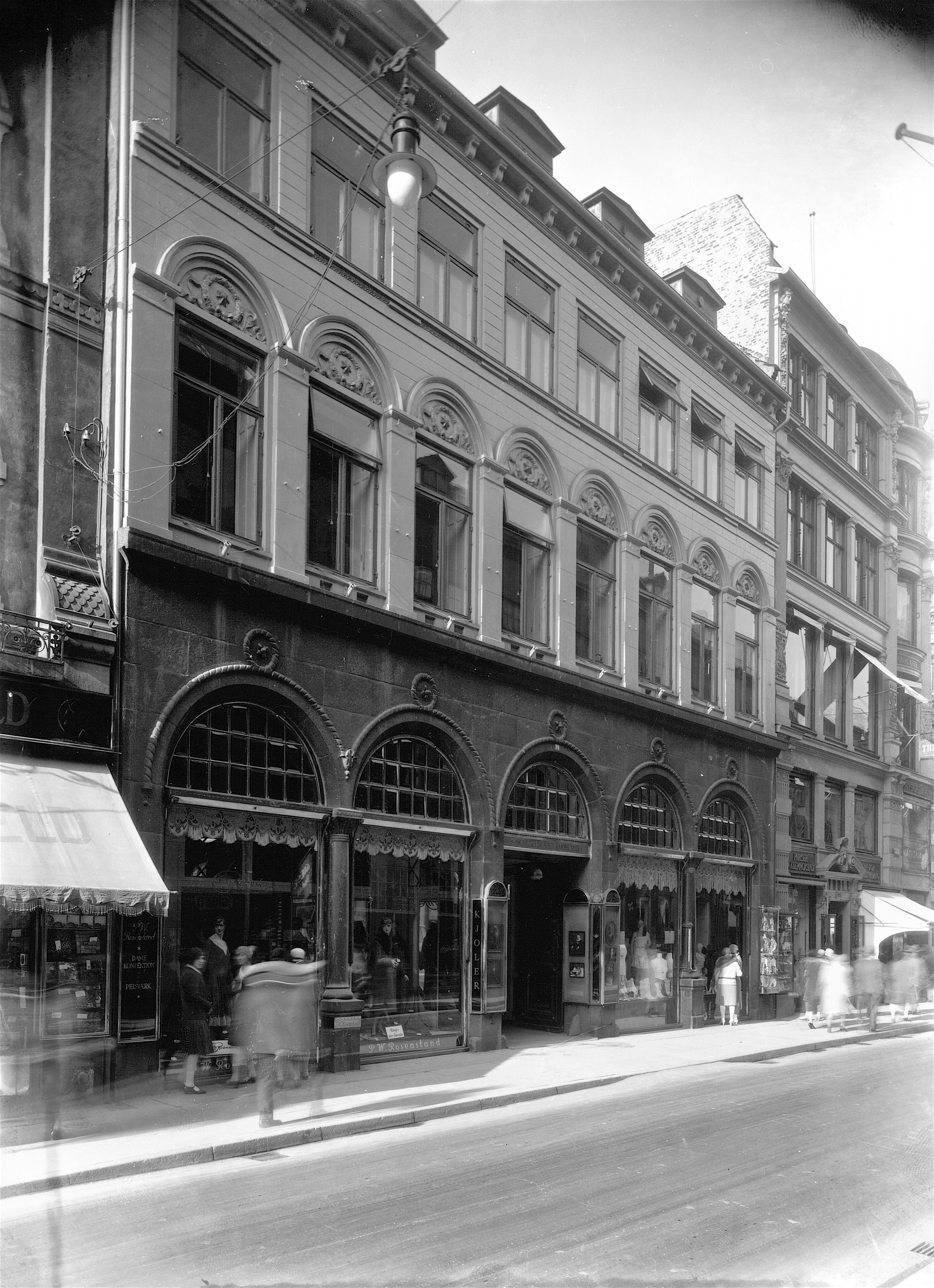
The building photographed by Elfelt

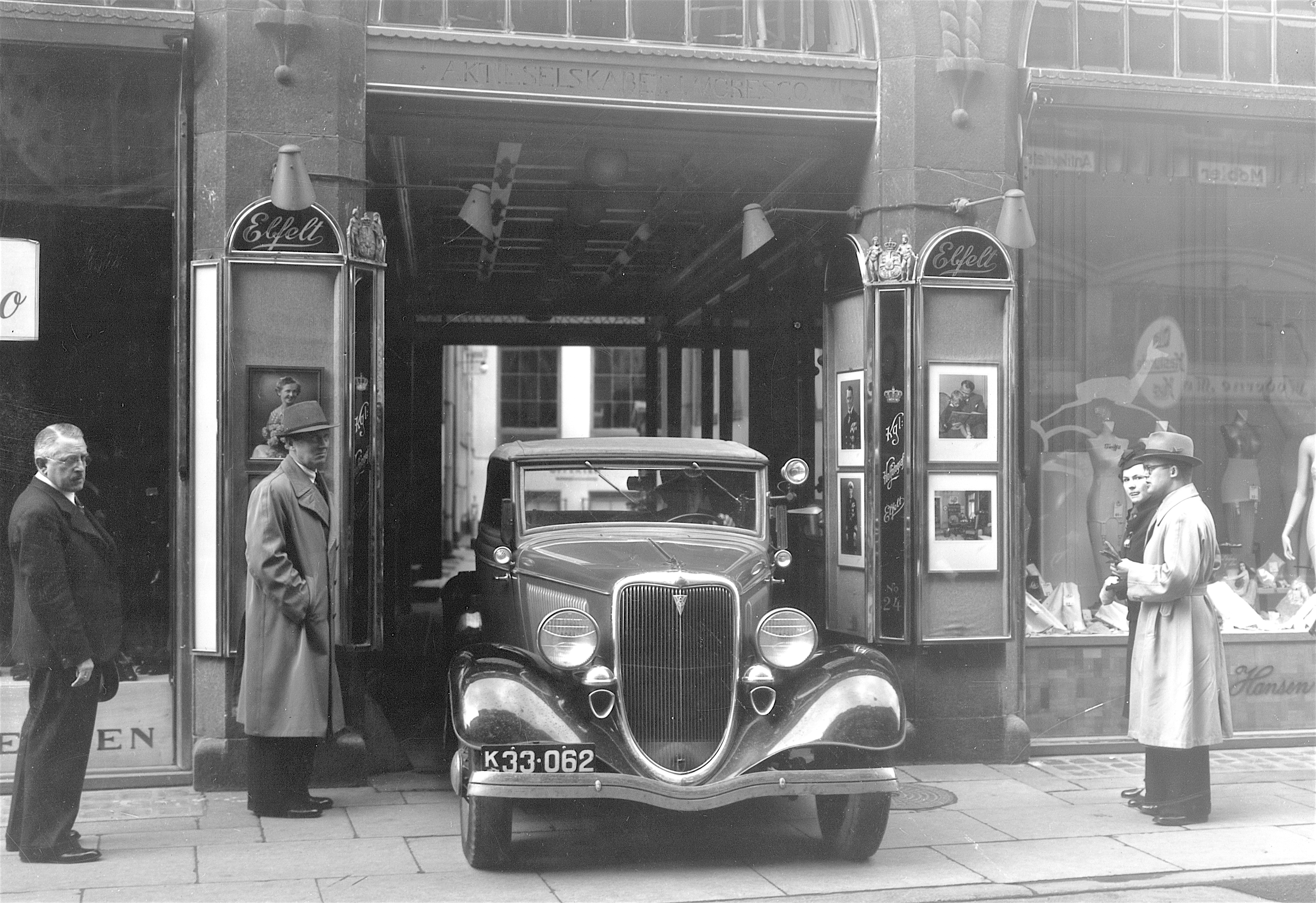
The entrance in 1938

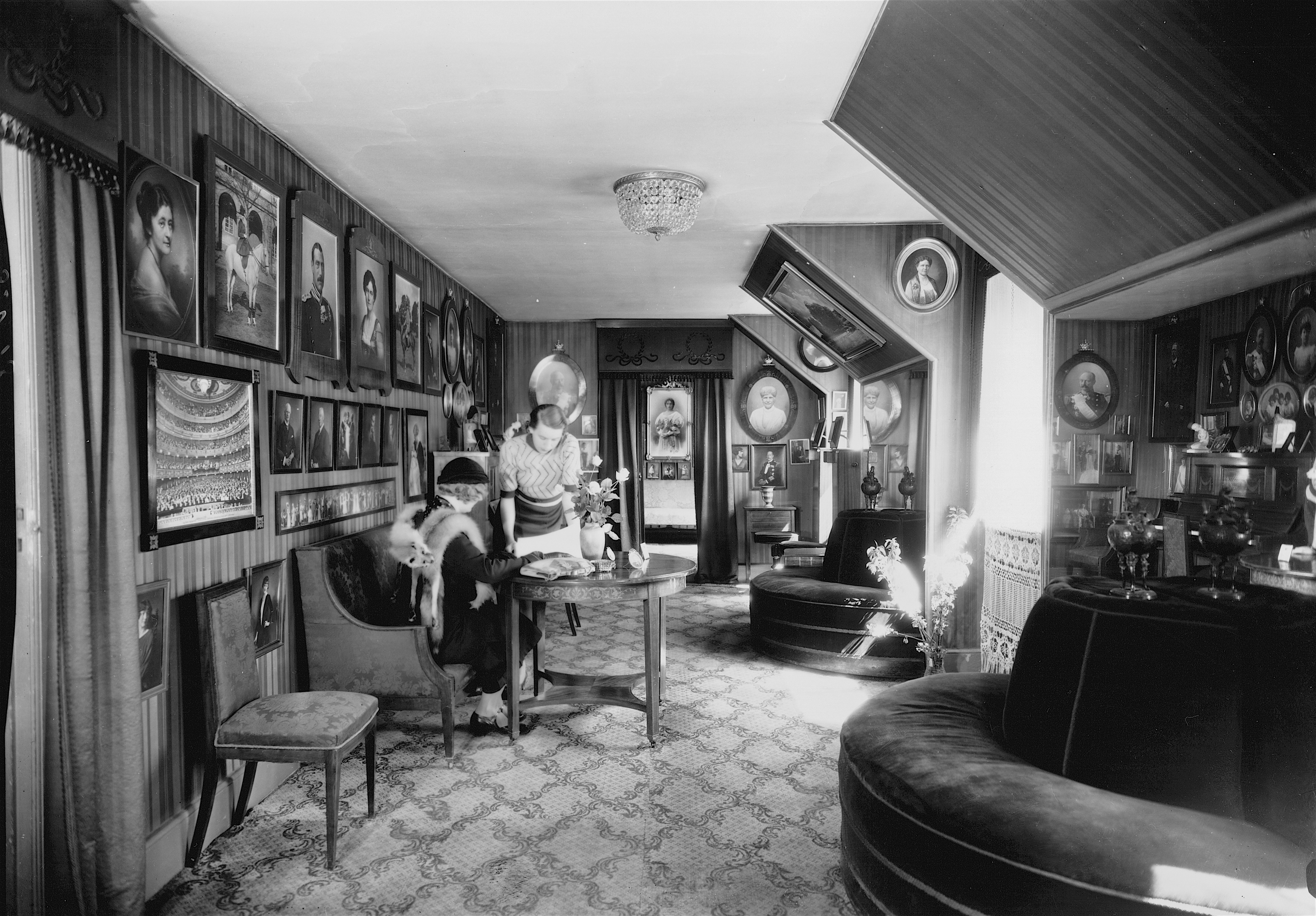
Elfelt's studio, 1935

== Architecture ==
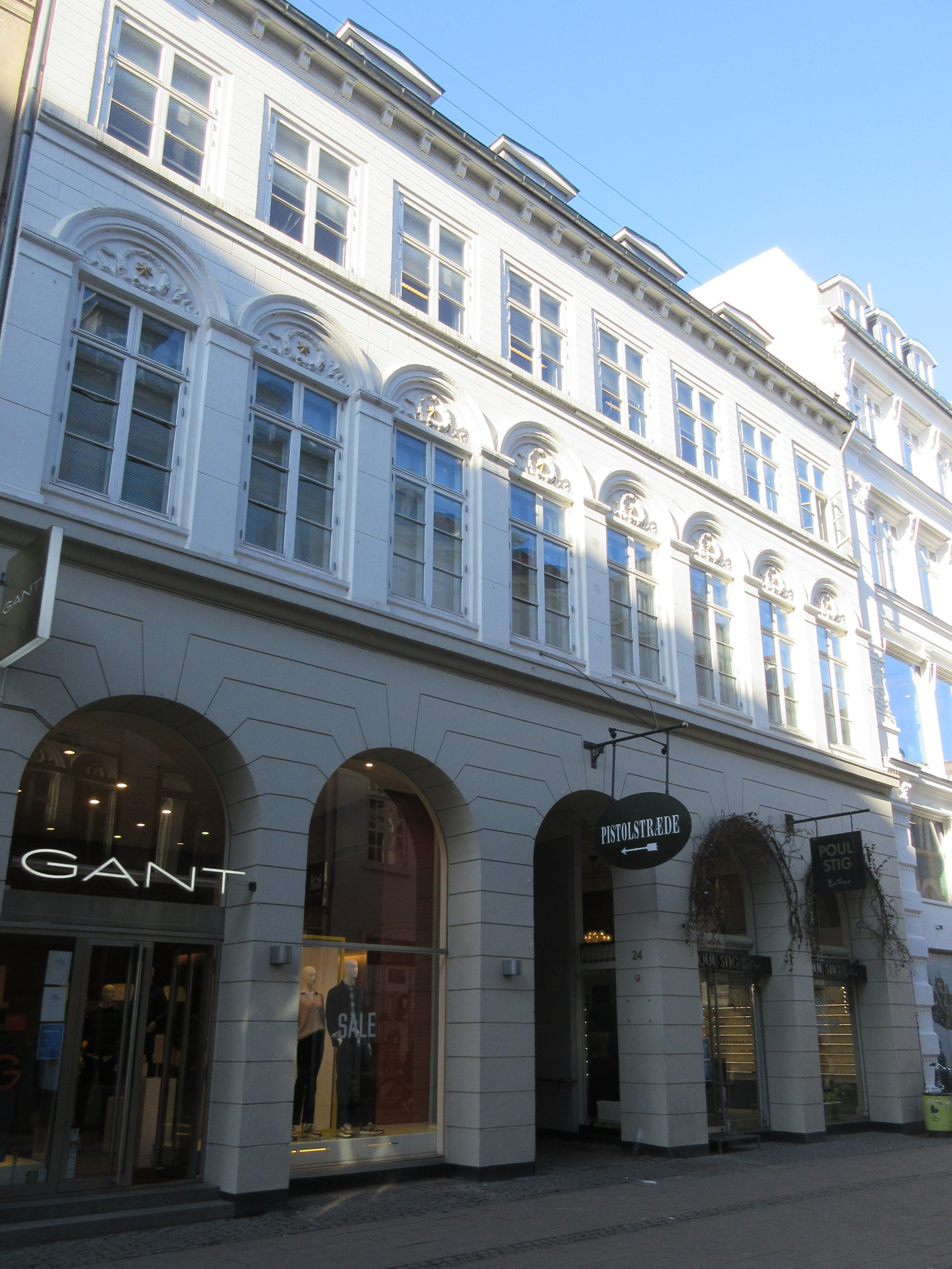
The building in 2021

Østergade 24 is a three-storey building. The tall first-floor windows are topped by arched niches with stucco ornamentation. The facade is finished by a dentillated cornice.

== Today ==
The property is today owned by Kirkebi A/S. Kirkbi's Copenhagen office is based in the building. The tenants include a Gant shop on the ground floor.
