= Sophus Christopher Hauberg =

Danish industrialist

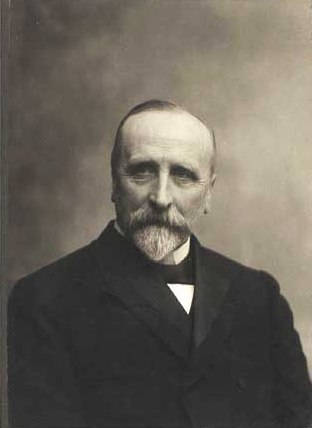
- Hauberg photographed by Ludvig Crone
- Born: 28 December 1848; Copenhagen, Denmark
- Died: 7 March 1920 (aged 71); Copenhagen, Denmark
- Resting place: Vestre Cemetery
- Occupation: Businessman
- Known for: Organisation work

Sophus Christopher Hauberg (28 December 1848 - 7 March 1920) was a Danish industrialist. He started the machine factory S. C. Hauberg on Tagensvej, which after two mergers in 1897 evolved into Titan A/S with Hauberg serving as its managing director until 1916. He was also active in organisation work, both as a driving force behind the first organisations for employers in the iron industry in 1887 and as president of the Confederation of Danish Employers from 1906 until his death in 1920.

== Early life and education ==
Hauberg was born on 28 December 1848 in Copenhagen, the son of pharmacist Jørgen Christian Hauberg (1814–99) and Margrethe Sophie Arboe (1818–1910). His elder brother was the painter and numismatic Peter Hauberg. He matriculated from Sorø Academy in 1867. He enrolled at the College of Advanced Technology in 1868 but discontinued his studies in 1871 to work on the preparations of the new Kalundborg Railway.

== Career ==
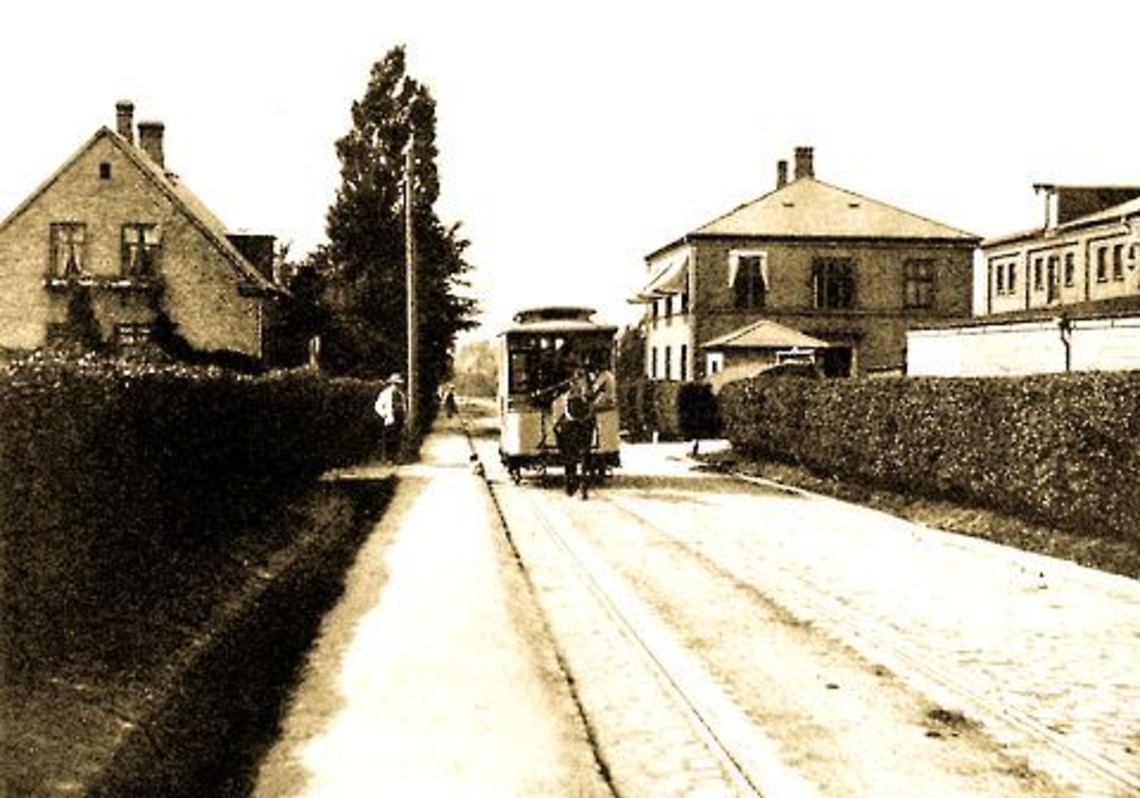
Tagensvej in Copenhagen with one of Hauberg's trams and his machine factory visible to the right, c. 1890

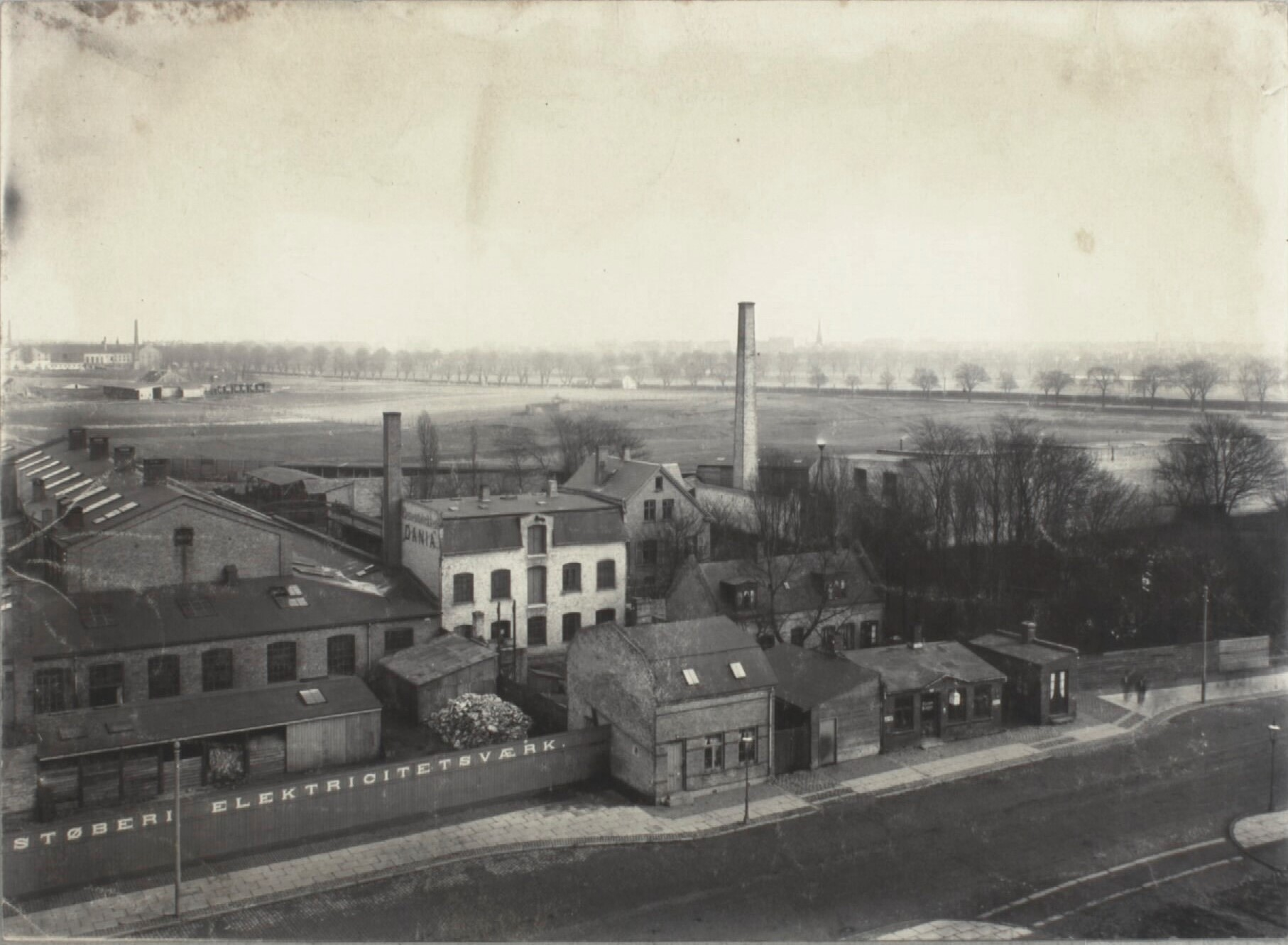
Titan in c. 1900

When his father together with a business partner in 1879 purchased Gamst & Lunds Eftf., an iron foundry and machine factory on Vester Boldgade, Hauberg gave up his ambitions to become a civil engineer to join the firm which continued as Hellerung & auberg. He took over his father's share of the firm in 1879 but left it in 1884 to start his own machine factory. In 1885, he opened S. C. Haüberg on Tagensvej, specializing in electrical installations.

In 1888, Hauberg merged his machine factory with H. Rudolph Koefoed & Co. on Meinungsgade under the name Koefoed & Hauberg. Both production sites were continued with Hauberg as the managing director. In 1897, Kofoed & Hauberg merged with Marstrand, Helweg & Co. under the name Titan A/S. Hauberg served as managing director of the company until his retirement in 1916.

On 11 November 1887, Hauberg acquired a concession on establishing a tram line between Sankt Annæ Plads in the city centre and Tagensvej. On 7 March 1888, he established the limited company Sølvgadens Sporvejsselskab. The tram line was inaugurated on 24 January 1889.

When the Danish parliament rejected the plans for the construction of a Storstrøm Bridge in 1910, he ubnsuccesfully applied for a concession on constructing it as a private venture.

He was a board member of H. E. Gosch & Co., Vølund and Frederiksberg Sporvejs- og Elektricitets A/S, Det danske Mælkekompagni, Det danske Elektricitetskompagni, Sejlskibsselskabet Hippalos, A/S De Ibsenske Grunde i Gentofte. and Kontrolkommissionen for Frederiksholms Teglog Kalkværker (chairman) as well as a member of the bank council of Københavnss Låne- og Diskontobank.

== Other activities ==
Hauberg was an active member of Toldreformforeningen. He was a driving force behind the foundation of Foreningen af fabrikanter i jernindustrien i København in 1885. He joined the board in 1889 and chaired the organisation from 1900 to 1903. In this capacity, he was the driving force behind the foundation of Sammenslutningen af arbejdsgivere inden for jern- og metalindustrien i Danmark in 1902 (president 1902–04( and Industrifagene in 1906 (president 1906–1920). He succeeded Kaspar Rostrup as president of the Danish Confederation of Industries in 1911–20.

== Personal life ==
Hauberg married Elizabeth (Lizzie) Thomson Bruce (23 February 1854 - 128 January 1878), a daughter of Alexander Bruce and Jeannie Thomson, on 25 November 1875 in Glasgow. Following her early death just 24 years old, he was second time married to Ellen Sophie Kastrup (29 January 1853 - 12 April 1942(, a daughter of merchant Theodor Peter Christian Kastrup (1820–80) and Flora Marie Schoustrup (1827–81), on 14 April 1883 in the Church of Our Lady in Copenhagen.

Hauberg is one of the men seen in Peder Severin Krøyer's monumental 1903 oil on canvas group portrait painting Men of Industry. His portrait was painted by Otto Bache in 1904 and 1912 (DI). He died on 7 March 1920 and is buried in Copenhagen's Western Cemetery.

== Accolades ==
Hauberg was created a Knight in the Order of the Dannebrog in 1907 and was awarded the Cross of Honour in 1911. He was made an honorary member of the Foreningen af fabrikanter i jernindustrien i København. He was president of Soransk Samfund from 1908 until his death.
