= Øbjerggaard =

House in Denmark

Ny Øbjerggaard
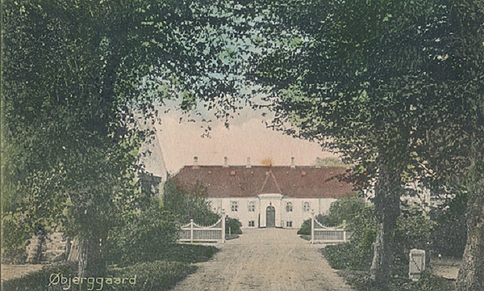
- Interactive map of the Ny Øbjerggaard area

General information
- Location: Øbjerggårds Allé 20, 4750 Lundby, Denmark
- Coordinates: 55°6′58″N 11°49′43″E
- Completed: ?
- Renovated: 1848

Øbjerggaard is a manor house and estate situated east of Køng, midway between Næstved and Vordingborg some 90 km (56 mi) south of Copenhagen, Denmark. One of 12 new manors created when Vordingborg Cavalry District was dissolved in 1774, it was initially the site of a textile factory established by Niels Ryberg. The current main building from the 1840s is now known as Ny Øbjerggaard (New Øbjerggaard). The old headquarters of the textile factory, Gammel Øbjerggaard (Old Øbjerggaard), constructed by Ryberg in 1780 and listed on the Danish registry of protected buildings and places in 1945, is now home to Køng Museum. The current owner of the estate, Peter Eriksen Oxholm Tillisch, resides at Rosenfeldt, his other estate, while Ny Øbjerggaard is operated as a bed and breakfast.

The former Spinning School and Køng Hospital are also heritage listed. Both buildings were constructed by the owner of Øbjerggaard. The spinning school was created to train local girls in the craft of spinning yarn from the flax grown on the fields and used in the textile production.In 1851, Køng Textile Factory was moved to Vintersbølle by a later owner.

== History ==
=== Crown land ===
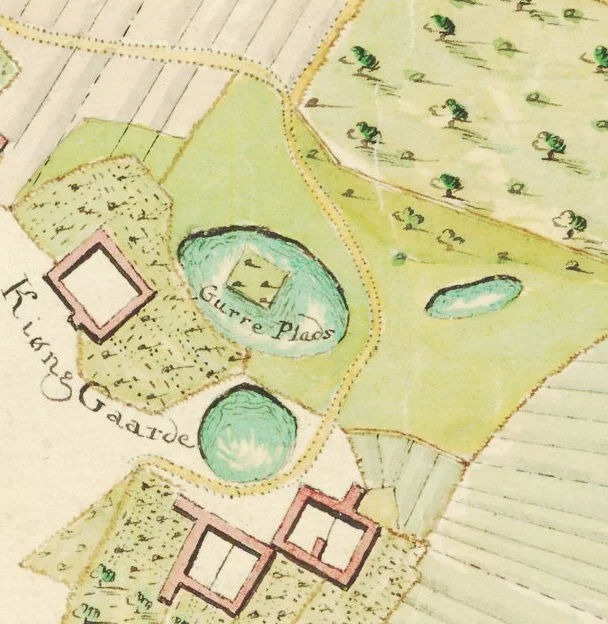
Køng Gaarde seen in a map detail from 1771.

The area where Ny Øbjerggaard stands today was listed in records from 1682 (Markbogen and Græsningsbogen) as Øebiergs aggere ('Øbjerg Field'). It belonged to Køng Gårde, a small hamlet of just three farms owned by the Crown. The bailiff (herredsfoged) of Hammer Herred, Jacob Gad, resided in one of the three farms. The name Øbjerg (lit. "Island Hill") referred to Øbjerg, a small hill in the otherwise flat landscape, situated approximately 200 m from the current main building.

The land was included in Vordingborg Cavalry District in 1715–1717.

=== Ryberg and Køng Textile Factory ===
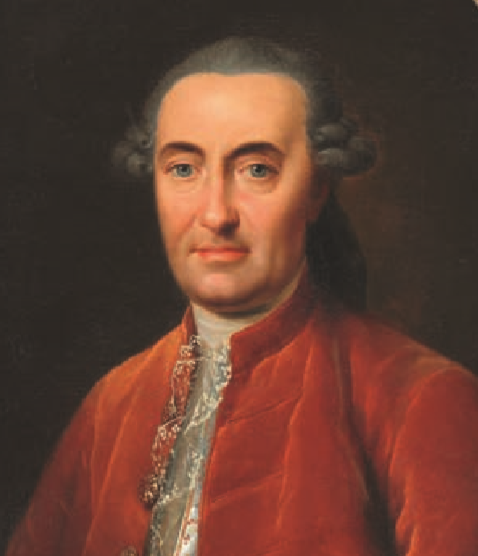
Niels Ryberg, detail from painting by Peter Brünniche.

In 1769, it was decided to sell Vordingborg Cavalry District. In 1774, Vordingborg Cavalry District was divided into 12 estates and sold at public auction. Estate No. 4, with an area of 283 tønder hartkorn, was given the name Øbjerggaard. No main building was located on the land but it comprised Køng Church. The auction took place at Vordingvorg Castle on 27 September. Øbjerggaard was sold to Ditlev Staal, owner of Klintholm Manor on Møn. On 31 December 1778, it became clear that Staal had acted as a straw man on behalf of the prominent Copenhagen-based businessman Niels Ryberg. Ryberg had already taken over the management of the estate at that time. His intention was to turn it into a centre for textile production.

Ryberg was part of the royal textile mill in Kongens Lyngby back in 1774. On 3 January 1776, Ryberg published a report on the economic advantages of promoting local industry in Denmark. Later the same year, the crown had pulled out of the textile mill in Kongens Lyngby. It was probably at this point that Ryberg had conceived the idea of starting a textile mill on the Øbjerggaard estate. Ryberg hired Christian Gottfried Voelker (1746–1819) from Thüringen, who had managed a spinning plant in Husum from 1773 to 1777, as manager of the estate and industrial venture. The land was planted with flax. A symmetrical complex of half-timbered buildings was constructed around a hexagonal courtyard. The buildings included a dairy, barn, stable, brewery and a forge as well as a forester's house situated a little further to the north. A house for the inspector (now Gammel Øbjerggaard) was constructed at the other end of a tree-lined avenue.

In 1781–1783, Ryberg and Voelker constructed two buildings with 14 and eight looms, respectively, adjacent to Gammel Øbjerggaard. Ivar Christian Thorning was hired as weaving master at the same time. The production of linen started in 1783. The factory was an instant success and had to be expanded several times. From 1784, it also had to import most of the flax from England and Germany. A sister factory was also established in Dragør where part of the canvas production took place. A new building with 24 looms was constructed at Gammel Øbjerggaard.

By 1786, Køng Textile Factory's spinning plants had reached a production of 16,000 pounds while the looms produced 27,660 ells of canvas, drejl and damask (10,000 pounds). The factory employed 25 weavers, 9 heglere, 14 spoolers and three other workers as well as 370 spinning women in the area. Ryberg had invested 20,000 rigsdaler in the factory. He also received a loan of 40,000 rigsdaler from the state as well as another loan of 30,000 rigsdaler for the construction of a bleaching plant in Vintersbølle east of Vordingborg. The factory was the largest supplier of home textiles and linen to the royal court but the products were also exported to the West Indies and America.

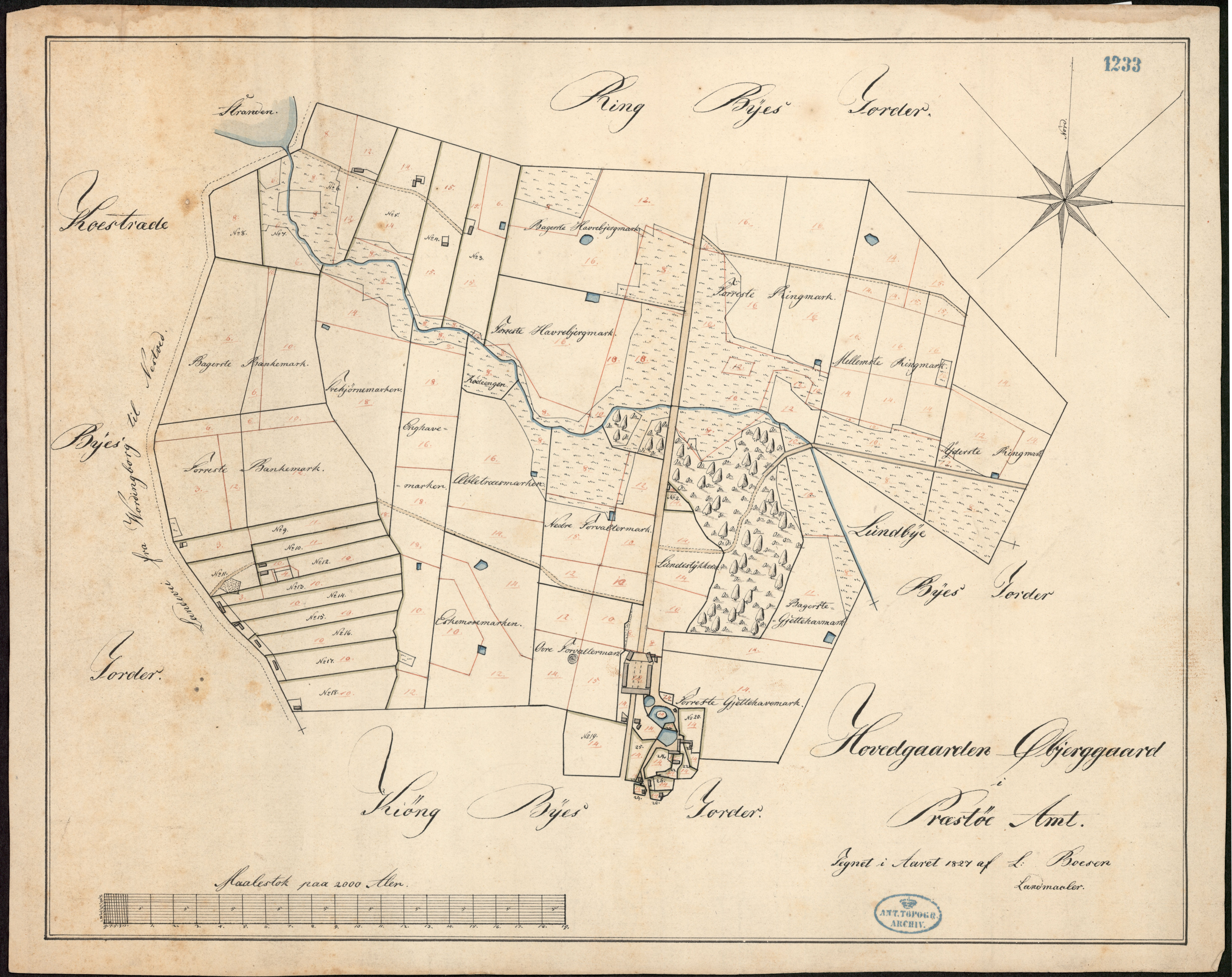
Øbjerggaard, 1827.

On Ryberg's death in 1804, Øbjerggaard passed to his son Johan Christian Ryberg (1767–1832).

=== Klingenberg family ===
In 1820m Æbjerggaard was taken over by the government. In 1836, it was sold at auction. The buyer was Christian Ludvig Klingenberg. His wife Marie Augusta Dinesen was the daughter of Jens Kraft Dinesen, owner of nearby Kragerup Manor. A few years after her husband's death, She sold Øbjerggaard. Their eldest daughter Ulricha was married to professor of medicine Sophus Engelsted.

=== Buchwald family ===
The new owner was Frederik von Buchwald (1790–1874), an army captain and the owner of Anneberggaard in Odsherred. On his death, Øbjerggaard passed to his son Carl Valdemar von Buchwald (1818–1887). In 1846, Gammel Øbjerggaard was struck by fire. Buchwald constructed a new main building on the site of the home farm at the other end of the tree-lined avenue. It was a one-storey building, 17 bays wide and 16 ells deep, with a red tile roof. In 1851, he moved Køng Textile Factory to Vintersbølle.

=== Changing owners, 1887–1933 ===
Buchwald was married to Christine Johanne Marie Aarestrup (1822–1910). In 1889 she sold the estate to J. W. C. Krieger. He fell ill and moved to Italy but his wife remained on the estate. In 1913, it was sold to Aage Faye. He was the son of Gerhard Faye, a pioneer of the sugar beet industry on Lolland-Falster. In 1918, Faye sold Øbjerggaard and a few years later purchased Birkendegård. The new owners of Øbjerggaard were Knud and Valdemar Hansen. The estate changed hands several times over the next two decades.

=== Sonne and the Tillisch family ===
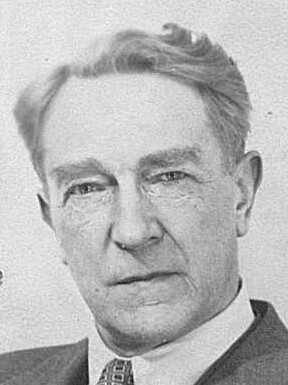
Hans Christian Sonne

In 1933, Øbjerggaard was acquired by the New York-based banker Hans Christian Sonne (1891–1971). His father Christian Sonne (1859–1941), a politician, had first been manager of Knuthenborg Avlsgård and later Rosenlund at Sakskøbing.

Sonne's sister Thora Mathilde (1889–1966) was married to Henrik Wilhelm Tillisch (1888–1979) (a great grandson of Georg Frederik Tillisch) who served as manager of Øbjerggaard from 1936. In 1956, he purchased the estate from his brother-in-law. In 1974, he ceded it to his sons Holger (1921–2000) and Erik (1925–2007). In 1995, it was passed to Erik Tillisch's son Peter.

== Architecture ==
Buchwald's main building from 1848 was a one-storey building, 17 bays wide and 16 ells deep, with a red tile roof. A staircase addition with a slate roof was added in 1864. It was heightened by Krieger in 1892–1893. In 1933, Sonne commissioned local master carpenter H. P. Nielsen to expand the entire building by one storey.

The main building is flanked by two half-timbered buildings from Ryberg's original complex from the 1770s.

Gammel Øbjerggaard is a long Neoclassical building with a central wall dormer. It was listed in the Danish registry of protected buildings and places in 1918.

== Today ==
The estate is currently owned by Eriksen Oxholm Tillisch. Ny Øbjerggaard is operated as a bed and breakfast.

== List of owners ==
- ( –1774) The Crown
- (1774) Ditlev Staal
- (1774–1804) Niels Ryberg
- (1804–1820) Johan Christian Ryberg
- (1820–1836) The state
- (1836–1840) Christian Ludvig Klingenberg
- (1840–1845) Augusta Klingenberg, née Dinesen
- (1845–1854) Frederik Buchwald
- (1854–1887) Carl Valdemar Buchwald
- (1887–1889) Christine Johanne Marie Buchwald, née Aarestrup
- (1889–1913) J.W.C. Krieger
- (1913–1918) Aage Faye
- (1918–1920) Knud Hansen
- (1918–1920) Valentin Hansen
- (1920–1925) J. Brabæk
- (1925–1926) Udstykningsforeningen
- (1926–1931) W. Kjær
- (1931–1933) J.E. Nielsen
- (1933–1956) Hans Christian Sonne
- (196?–1974) Henrik Wilhelm Tillisch
- (1974–1995) Erik and Holger Tillisch
- (1995–present) Peter Eriksen Oxholm Tillisch
