= Søren Anton van der Aa Kühle =

Danish brewer and chief business executive

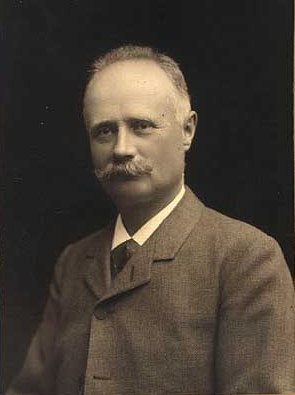
- Born: 27 October 1849; Aalborg, Denmark
- Died: 12 April 1906 (aged 56); Copenhagen, Denmark
- Occupations: Brewer and business executive
- Awards: Knight of the Dannebrog, 1994

Søren Anton van der Aa Kühle (27 October 1849 - 12 April 1906) was a Danish brewer and chief business executive. He was chief operational officer of Gamle Carlsberg from 1881 and succeeded J.C. Jacobsen as managing director of the brewery in 1887.

== Early life and education ==
Kühle was born on 27 October 1849 in Aalborg, the son of first lieutenant and later colonel Nicolai Seyer K. (1815–83) and Margrethe Emilie Kofoed (1828–1900). He attended Sorø Academy from 1761 but left the school after seventh grade in 1867 to enroll at the Army Officer Academy in Copenhagen. He was made a second lieutenant at the age of 19 but left the army in 1876 and was in 1877 granted rank of captain.

== Career ==
Kühle was educated as a brewer under his father-in-law at Wibroe Brewery in Helsingør. He later served as manager of Rabeshave Brewery in Christianshavn from 1870 to 1879.

On 1 April 1879 he started working for Gamle Carlsberg where J.C. Jacobsen was soon struck by his technical and administrative qualifications. In a contract dated 18 May 1880 Jacobsen appointed him as chief operational officer with effect from 1 October 1881 as well as his future successor as managing director of the brewery following his own death. Upon Jacobsen's death in 1887, Gamle Carlsberg was therefore headed by Kühle in close collaboration with its new owner Carlsberg Foundation.He played a key role in the process that culminated with the merger of Gamle Carlsberg with Carl Jacobsen's Nye Carlsberg in 1902. He was also a board member of Carlsberg Laboratory and Bryggeriforeningen.

== Personal life ==
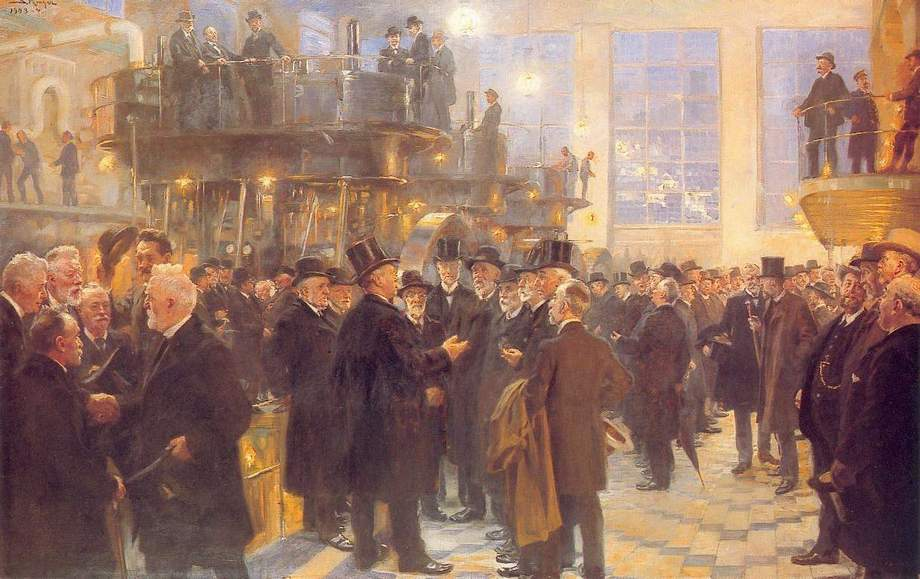
P. S. Krøyer: Men of Industry (1904)

Kühle married Johanne Emilie Wibroe (27 March 1851 - 2 October 1933), a daughter of Carl Wibroe (1812–88) and Christine Wilhelmine Magdalene Klentz, on 4 December 1875 in Helsingør. He was the father of filmmaker Kay van der Aa Kühle.

Kühle was created a Knight in the Order of the Dannebrog in 1894. He is one of the industrialists seen in Peder Severin Krøyer's monumental group painting Men of Industry (1904). He died on 12 April 1906 and is buried at Vestre Cemetery in Copenhagen.
