= Valdemar Oldenburg =

Danish jurist (1834–1918)

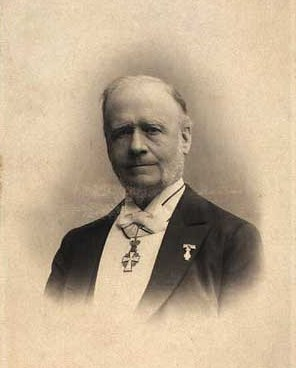
Valdemar Oldenburg.

Valdemar Oldenburg (1 December 1834 – 6 June 1918) was a Danish jurist who served as Lord President (overpræsident) of Copenhagen.

== Early life and education ==
Oldenburg was born in Sorterup as the son of T. Oldenburg (1805–1842) and Louise Rothe (1808–1891). His father was the local pastor. He matriculated from Copenhagen's Metropolitan School in 1853 before enrolling at the University of Copenhagen from where he achieved his law degree in 1859. He worked as an assistant in the Ministry for Slesvig from 1859 and passed the Slesvig legal exam in 1861.

== Career ==
Oldenburg was employed as military prosecutor in 1863 but was fired during the army reduction of 1866. He then taught at the Naval Officers' School until 1871 and the Army Officers' School (1868–1872) before once again being appointed as an army prosecutor in 1870.

In 1871, he was appointed acting Deputy Police Director in Copenhagen. In 1877, he was appointed bailiff (byfoged) and by- og rådstueskriver in Odense. In 1888, he was appointed judge and scribe (skriver) of Copenhagen County's northern birk. In 1900, he was appointed Lord President (overpræsident) in Copenhagen. In 1901, he played a minor role in conjunction with the political reforms (systemskifte). He retired in 1910.

He chaired the Tuberculosis Commission of 1901 and was one of the founders of the Nationalforeningen til tuberkulosens bekæmpelse.

== Personal life ==
Oldenburg married the daughter of first lieutenant and later commander captain Magnus Nicolai Suenson (1802–1856) and Augusta Stephansen (1815–1906) on 2 February 1864 in Copenhagen Henriette Suenson (1839–1895).

He is depicted on Peder Severin Krøyer's monumental 1904 group portrait painting Men of Industry and Laurits Tuxen's 1906 group portrait painting Leaving the Table. He died on 6 June 1918 and is buried at Ordrup Cemetery.

== Awards ==
Oldenburg was created a Knight in the Order of the Dannebrog in 1882. In 1885, he was awarded the Cross of Honour. He was created a 2nd-class Commander of the Order of the Dannebrog in 1895 and a 1st-class Commander in 1903. He was awarded the Grand Cross in 1909 and F.M.l. in 1915.
