= Jacob Heinrich Moresco =

Businessperson (b. 1828, d. 1906)

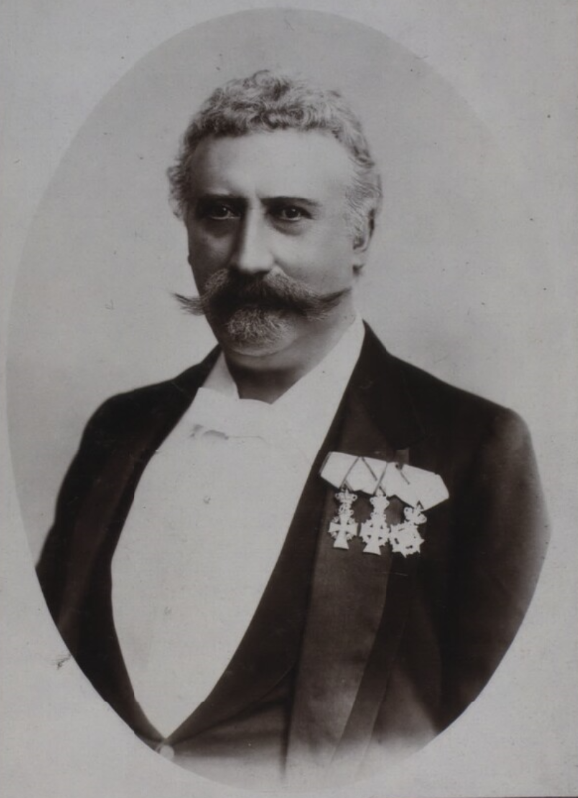
- Born: 2 May 1828; The Hague, The Netherlands
- Died: 29 October 1906 (aged 78); Copenhagen, Denmark
- Occupation: Businessman
- Awards: Commander of the Order of the Dannebrog (1st degree), 1906

Jacob Heinrich Moresco (2 May 1828 - 29 October 1906), also known simply as Jacob Heinrich, was one of the first large-scale manufacturers of women's clothing in Denmark. His company, which at the end of the 19th century was the largest of its kind in the Nordic countries, was after his death in 1906 continued by his nephew Carl Moresco. His former hone, Villa Adelaide, was located in what is now Ordrup Park. Morescovej is named after him.

== Early life and education ==
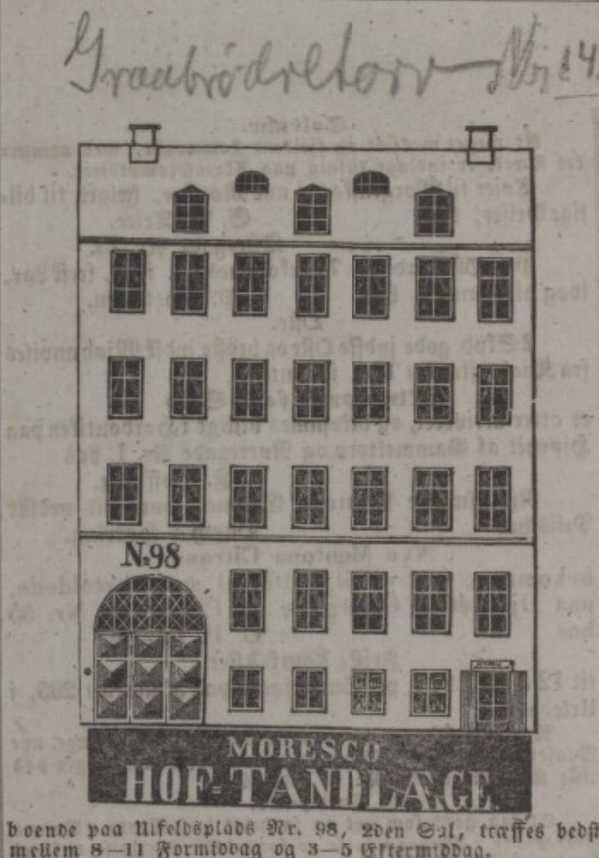
Advert for "Court Dentist Moresco" at Gråbrødretorv

Jacob Heinrich Moresco was born in Copenhagen, the son of Maximillian Moresco and Adelaide Italiaender. His father had come to Denmark from The Hague in about 1820 and married Adelaide approximately one year before Moresco was born.

Moresco attended Mariboe's School. His father was a reputable dentist with title of court dentist (høf-tandlæge)and wanted his son to follow in his footsteps. Moresco was, however, more interested in a commercial career, and was instead apprenticed to textile merchant Unna at the corner of Købmagergade and Østergade. He later worked for Carl Løvgren, who ran the leading clothing store of the time. In 1855, Moresco travelled to Paris where he learned tailoring before returning to Copenhagen the following year.

== Career ==
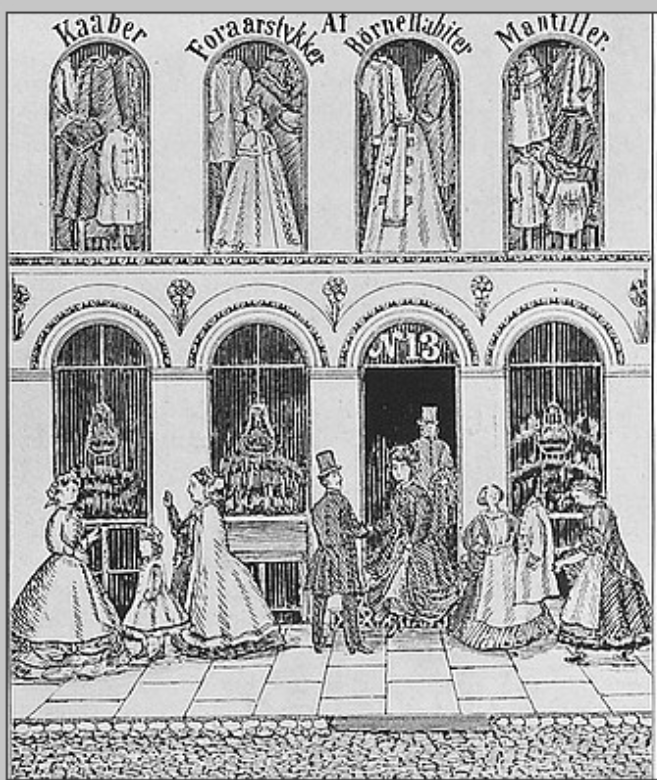
Amagertorv 13

On 16 April 1856, Moresco opened a store with women's clothing and fashion accessories at Amagertorv 13. In 1864, he opened a wholesale business at No. 14.

In 1882, Moresco's company relocated to Østergade 24. After a few years, J. Moresco had developed into the largest manufacturer of women's clothing in the Nordic countries with considerable export to Southern Sweden and Norway. When Sweden increased its tariffs on clothing from Denmark in 1890, Moresco responded by establishing a Swedish subsidiary, aAB Moresco, in Malmö, followed by a Norwegian subsidiary in Christiania in 1897.

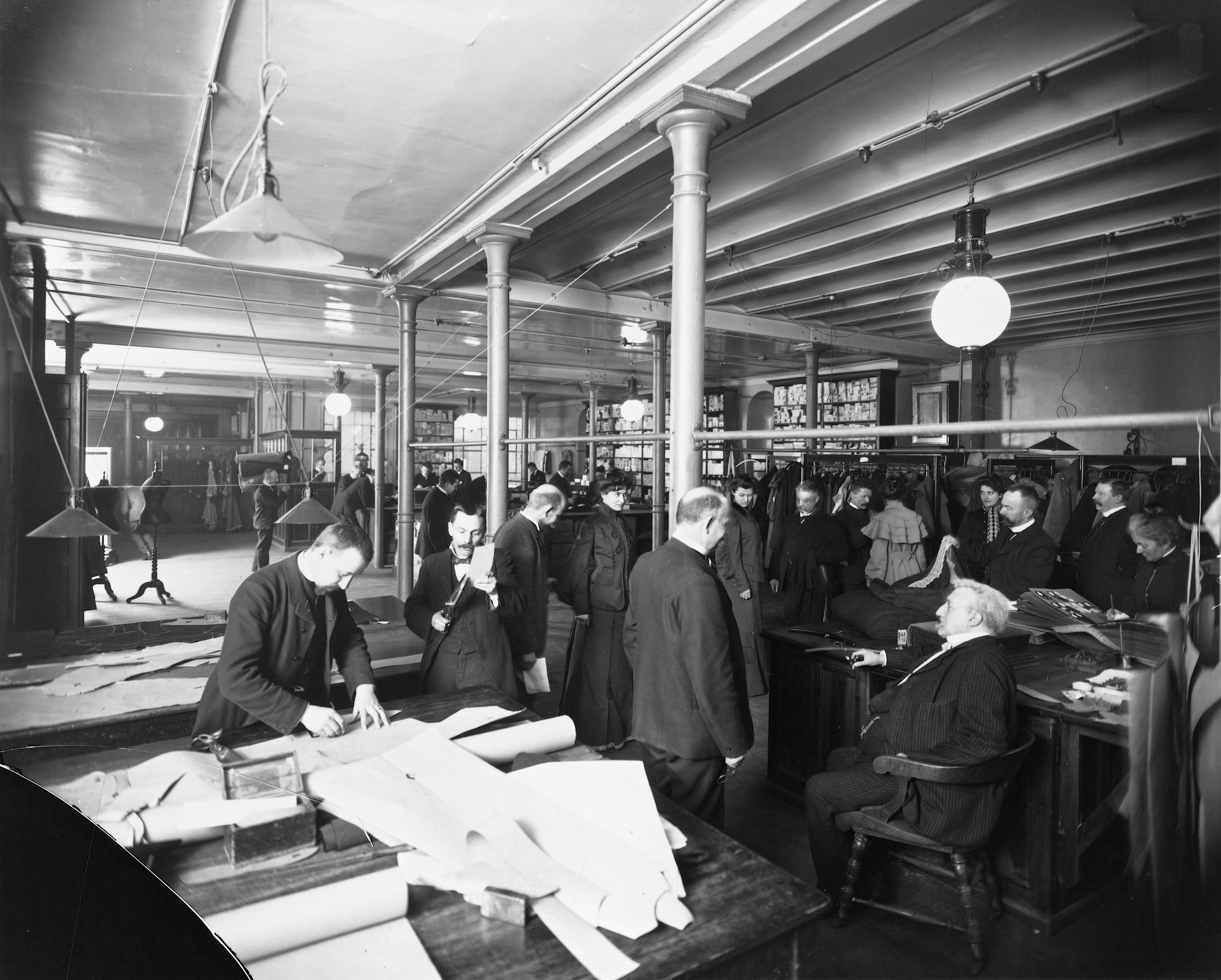
Tailors at work in Moresco's workshop at Østergade 24 photographed by Peter Elfelt in 1904

The parent company in Copenhagen was in 1900 converted into a limited company (aktieselskab) under the name A/S J. Moresco and with an initial capital. of DKK 4 million. Moresco was chairman of the board and his nephew Carl Moresco was appointed as managing director. The company employed 3,000 people during the peak seasons at its 50 years' anniversary in 1906.

== Personal life and legacy ==
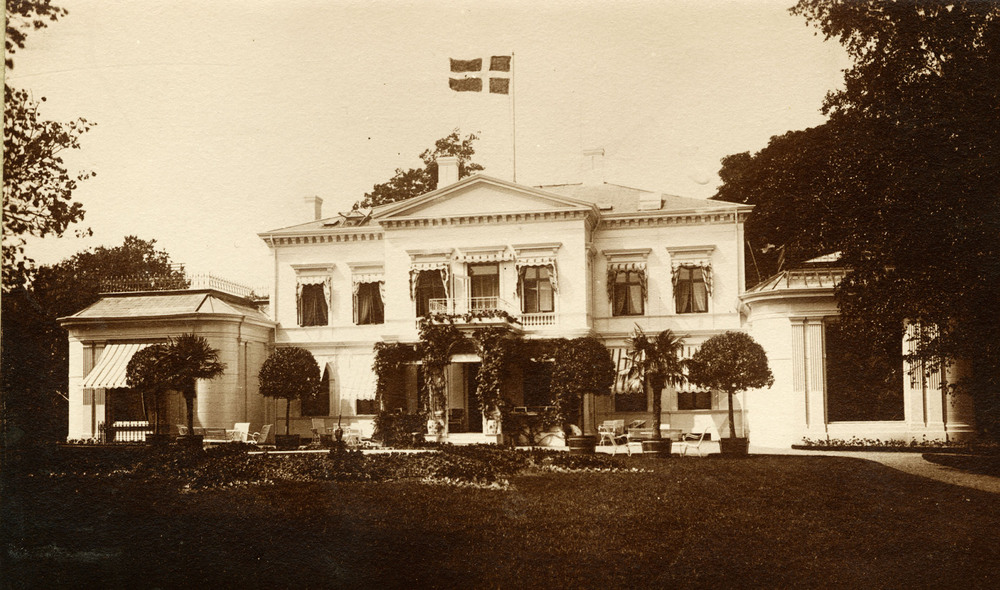
Moresco's country house Adelaide

Moresco purchased a property In Ordrup north of Copenhagen in 1871 and named it Adelaide after his mother. He was the second-largest tax-payer in the municipality, only surpassed by Jacob Hegel at Skovgården.

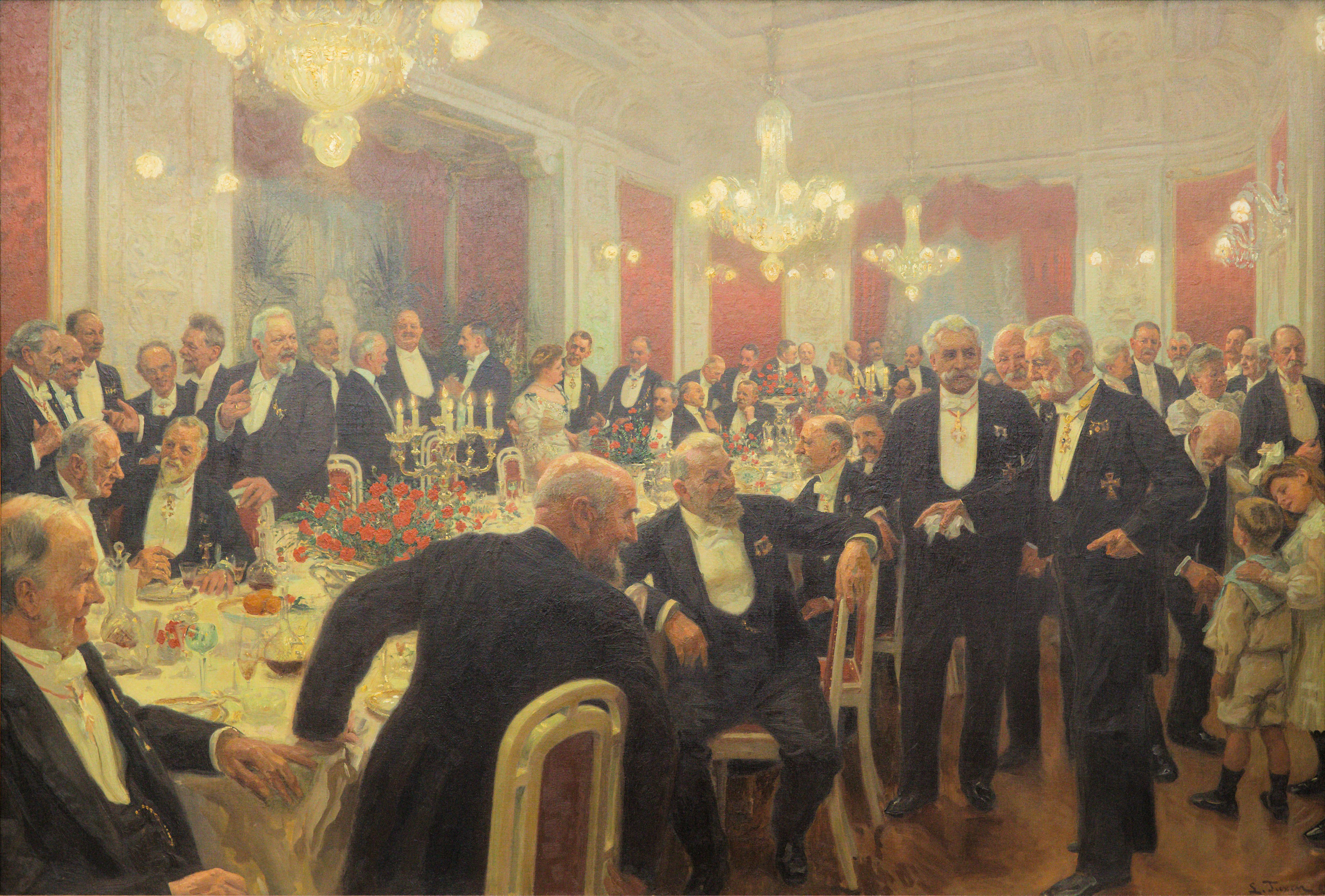
Laurits Tuxen: Leaving the Table (1906)

He is one of the businessmen depicted on Peder Severin Krøyer's monumental 1895 group portrait painting From Copenhagen Stock Exchange in Børsen. Another group portrait painting, Laurits Tuxen's Leaving the Table depicts a scene from a dinner party in his home. The painting was a gift to him in connection with the 50 years' anniversary of his company on 16 April 1906. It was painted on the basis of a black-and-white photograph taken at a dinner party some time before the anniversary.

He died unmarried and without children on 29 October 1906 and is buried in the Western Jewish Cemetery in Copenhagen. He left his estate to his nephew Carl Moresco. In 1943, three years after Carl Moresco's death, Villa Adelaide was acquired by Gentofte Municipality and converted into a daycare. It was demolished in 1969 and Ordrup Park is now located at the site. Morescovej in Gentofte is named after him.

== Honours ==
Moresco was created a Knight of the Dannebrog in 1885, a Commander of the 2nd Class in 1904 and finally a Commander of the 1st Class in 1906. He was awarded the Cross of Honour in 1892.
