= Niels Steenberg =

Danish engineer

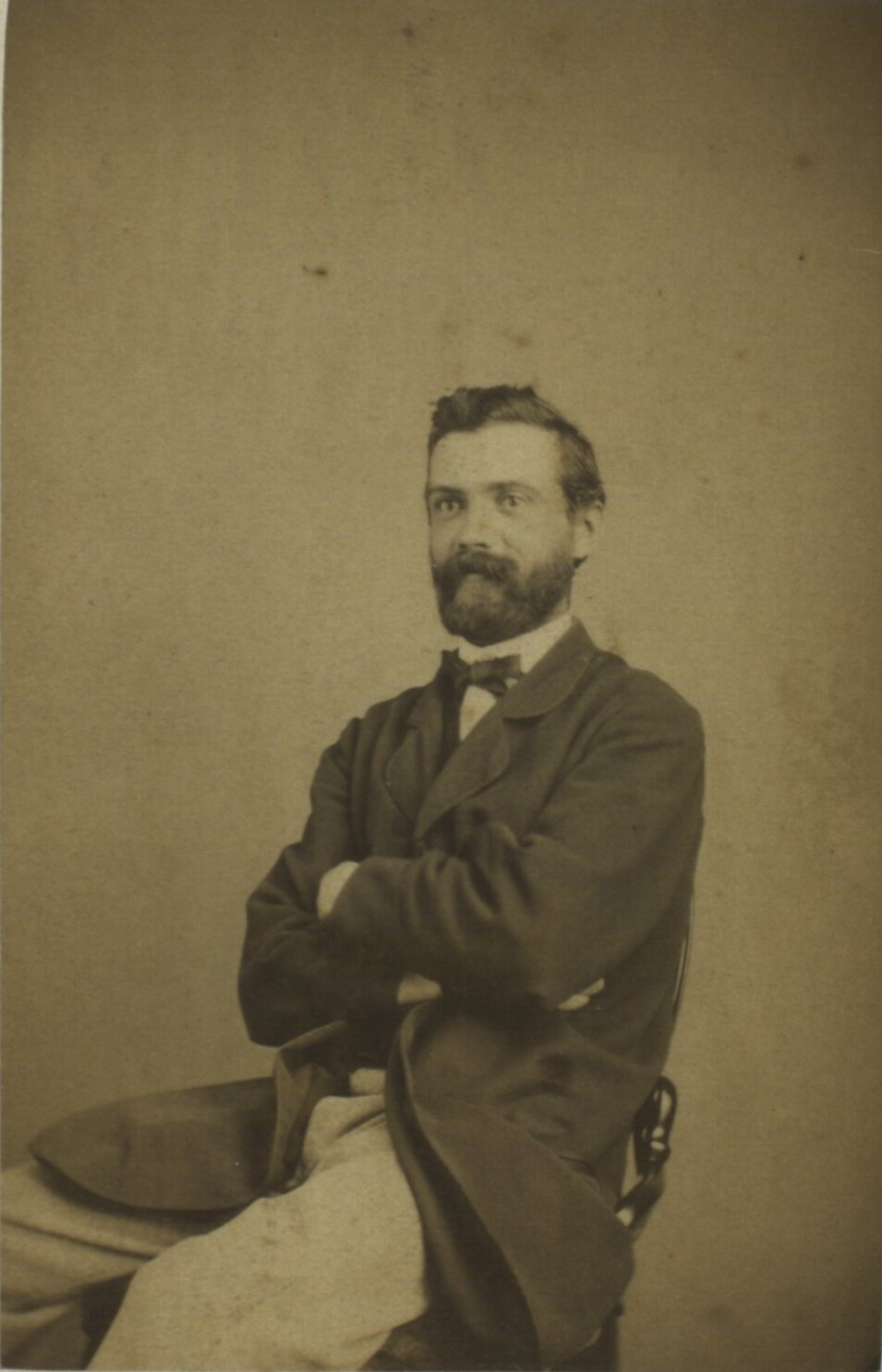
Niels Steenberg.

Niels George Steenberg (31 November 1839 – 6 February 1915) was a Danish engineer who played an important role in the development of Denmark's chemical industry. He was professor of technical chemistry at the Technical University of Denmark from 1894 and president of the Danish Association of Engineers from 1907 to 1910.

== Early life and education ==
Steenberg was born in Copenhagen, the son of military surgeon Frederik Steenberg (1802–1859) and Johanne Caroline Tengstedt (1811–1901). He attended Melchior's School before enrolling at the College of Advanced Technology in 1855 from where he graduated in applied sciences in 1861.

== Career ==
Steenberg worked as factory manager for Jacob Holm & Sønner from 1865. He was responsible for the construction of the company's new glue factory in Sundbyøster as well as for modernizing its soap production. He was also responsible for the creation of a new laboratory which resulted in the introduction of new instruments and production methods. In 1890 he visited England to buy machinery for a new string factory at the company's ropewalk on Amager.

Steenberg succeeded August Thomsens as teacher of technical chemistry at the College of Advanced Rechnology in 1784 and he was the following year appointed as professor.

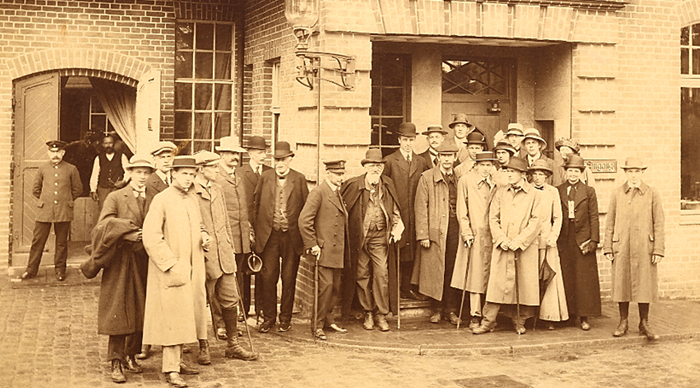
Niels Steenberg with students on an excursion to Germany, 1913.

Steenberg was a board member of numerous companies, including A/S Hertz' Garveri og Skotøjsfabrik (1897–), A/S Københavns Fodtøjsfabrik (1906–), A/S H. E. Gosch & Co. (1902–), A/S Kbh.s Tændstikfabrikker, Fabrikken Merkur and A/S Det Danske Moler-Selskab (1909–).

He was a member of Industriforeningen's board of representatives from 1896 to 1908 and a board member of Den tekniske forening from 1898 until his death. He was president of the Danish Association of Engineers from 1907 to 1910.

== Personal life ==
On 27 July 1869 in Mårum, Steenberg married Anna Dorothea Holten (1847–1884), daughter of forester Nicolai Holten (1815–1888) and Sophie Margrethe Ulrich (1820–1903). After her death, in Copenhagen on 20 May 1893 he married Anna Dorothea Cecilia Mogensen (1857–1916), daughter of iron foundry-owner Jens Frederik Frantz Mogensen (1823–1900) and Anna Dorothea Schou (1829–1917).

He died on 6 February 1915 and is buried in Copenhagen's Western Cemetery. He was created a Knight in the Order of the Dannebrog in 1903 and awarded the Cross of Honour in 1910. He is one of the men depicted in Peder Severin Krøyer's monumental group portrait painting Men of Industry.
