= Jørgen Bentzon =

Danish composer (1897–1951)

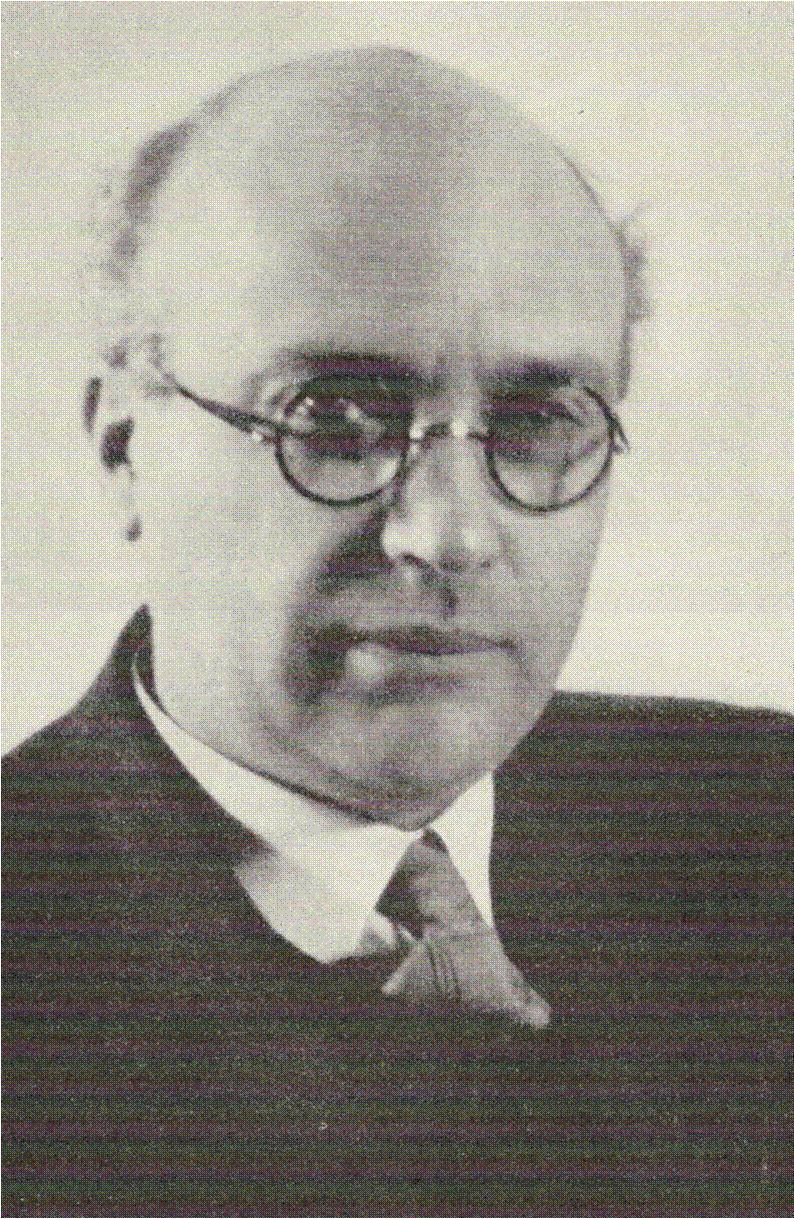
Jørgen Bentzon

Jørgen Liebenberg Bentzon (14 February 1897 – 9 July 1951) was a Danish composer. He was born in Copenhagen, and was a cousin of Danish composer Niels Viggo Bentzon and flautist Johan Bentzon. He was a student of Carl Nielsen from 1915 until 1919.

His works include six works entitled Racconto, the first for flute, alto saxophone, bassoon and double bass, the second for flute and string trio, the third of which is for woodwind trio, etc.; a Sinfonia Buffo Op. 35 and two symphonies (the first, Op. 37, inspired by Charles Dickens); a piano concerto (recorded on private tape); "Three expressive sketches" for violin and cello; a string quartet; an opera Saturnalia; and other works.

== Selected works ==
- Variations on a Theme of Chopin, Op. 1, for piano
- Fabula, Op. 42, for viola solo (1939)

== See also ==
Free scores by Jørgen Bentzon at the International Music Score Library Project (IMSLP)
