= Men of Industry =

1904 painting by Peder Severin Krøyer

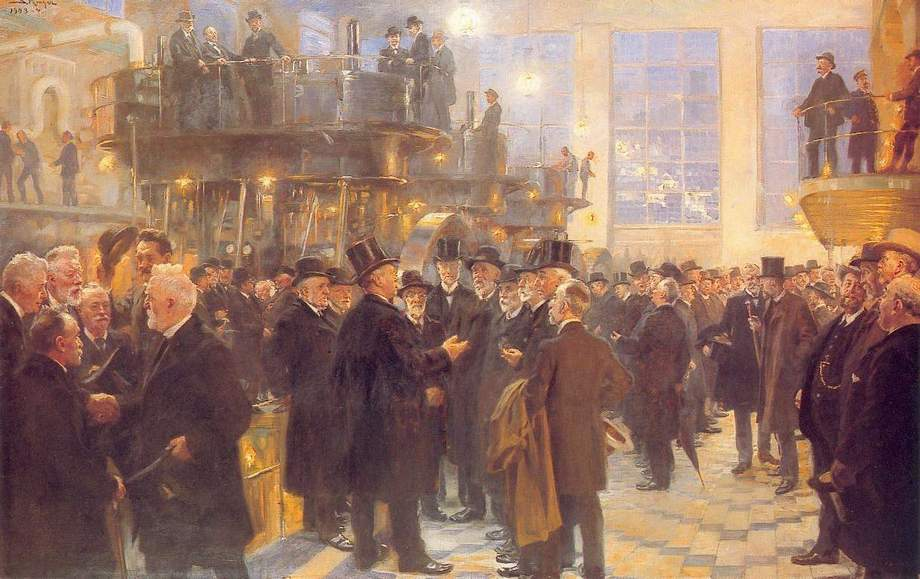
- Artist: Peder Severin Krøyer
- Year: 1904
- Medium: Oil-on-canvas
- Dimensions: 116 cm × 185 cm (46 in × 73 in)
- Location: Frederiksborg Museum (Hillerød)

Men of Industry (Danish: Industriens Mænd) is a 1903–1904 oil on canvas group portrait painting by Peder Severin Krøyer (1851–1909) featuring 53 leading representatives of the technical sciences in Denmark during the second half of the 19th century, seen at a fictional gathering at Østerbro Power Station in Copenhagen. The painting was commission by Gustav Adolph Hagemann and is now on display in the Museum of National History at Frederiksborg Castle, Hillerød.

== History ==
The idea for the painting was already conceived by Hagemann in 1881 while he was entertaining C. F. Tietgen who was posing for Peder Severin Krøyers portrait of him. Hagemann presented the idea of four monumental group portrait paintings for the newly refurbished Great Hall in Børsen featuring leading representatives of the trade, industry agriculture and shipping sectors in Denmark.

Only the first of the four paintings, From Copenhagen Stock Exchange (1895), was realized. The idea for Men of Industry was revived in 1902 but now as a private commission by Hagemann, paid for out of his own pocket, for his home in Bredgade. Hagemann, who was a co-owner of Øresunds Chemiske Fabrikker, a board member and major shareholder of Burmeister & Wain and had just been appointed as director of the College of Advanced Technology, was at the height of his career.

The price agreed upon for the painting was DKK 10,000. By February 1903, Hagemann had created a list of the people who were to feature in the painting. The choice of people was not representative but rather a reflection of Hagemann's own network. Work on the painting was interrupted when Krøyer fell ill in the summer of 1903. It was completed in December 1904. It was first shown to the public in the spring of 1905.

Hagemann died in 1916. Sometime during the 1930s the painting was placed in G.A. Hagemann's Kollegium on Kristianiagade in Copenhagen. In 1958, it was purchased for DKK 20,000 by the Museum of National History at Frederiksborg Castle.

== List of people portrayed in the painting ==
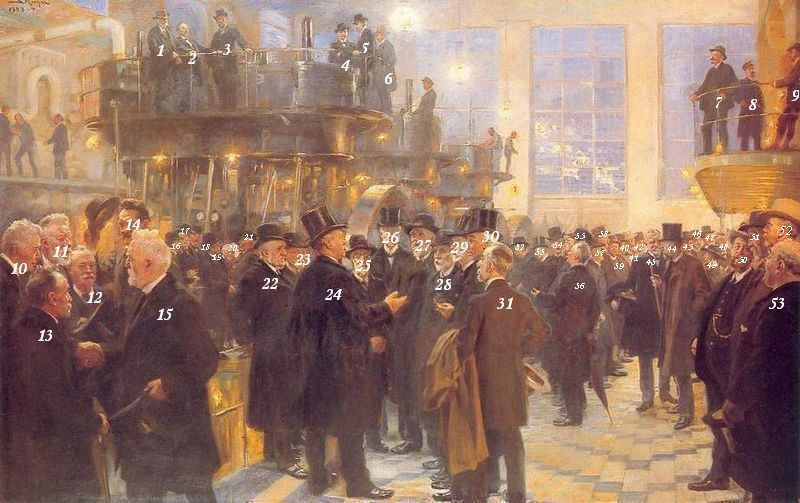
People in the painting
1. Gerhard Faye (1846–1917)
2. Gustav Adolph Hagemann (1842–1916)
3. Ivar Knudsen (1861–1920)
4. Holger Christian Valdemar Møller (1854–1943)
5. O.E. Jørgensen (1875–1949)
6. F. Øllgaard (1856–1911)
7. N.C. Monberg (1856–1930)
8. Aage Rasmussen (1855–1932)
9. C.F. Jarl (1872–)
10. Isaac Wilhelm Tegner (1832–1909)
11. Carl Jacobsen (1842–1914)
12. Knud C.J. Nielsen (1845–1909)
13. Harald Immanuel Hannover (1861–1937)
14. Carl Hentzen (1863–1937)
15. C.K. Øllgaard (1841–1915)
16. C.V. Slomann (1853–1919)
17. Søren Winkel (1841–1921)
18. J.J. Voltelen (1851–1928)
19. Johan O.V. Irminger (1848–1939)
20. Hans Bekkevold (1837–1905)
21. Ch. H. Reynolds
22. Julius Thomsen (1826–1909)
23. Sophus Mads Jørgensen (1837–1914)
24. Ib Windfeld-Hansen (1845–1926)
25. Emil Christian Hansen (1842–1909)
26. Valdemar Oldenburg (1834–1918)
27. Niels Steenberg (1839–1915)
28. Charles Ambt (1847–1919)
29. Philip Schou (1838–1922)
30. Edouard Suenson (1842–1921)
31. Vilhelm Jørgensen (1844–1925)
32. Niels Mogensen (1848–1916)
33. Otto Busse (1850–1933)
34. Alexander Foss (1858–1925)
35. William Millinge (1853–1921)
36. Søren Anton van der Aa Kühle (1839–1915)
37. Fritz Holm (1831–1922)
38. S.A. Faber (1867–1937)
39. Povl Bentzon (1858–1943)
40. Valdemar Poulsen (1869–1942)
41. Arnold Krog (1856–1931)
42. Albert Theilgaard (1877–1936)
43. C.A. Olesen (1845–1920)
44. Alfred Benzon (1855-1932)
45. Jens Lange (1861–1922)
46. Alfred Hertz (1871–1939)
47. Ove Munck (1873–1948)
48. E. Pontoppidan (1848–1926)
49. Oscar Engholm (1871–1951)
50. Fritz Johannsen (1855–1934)
51. Sophus Christopher Hauberg (1848–1920)
52. A.B. Reck (1850–1927)
53. Harald Bing (1848–1924)

== Other versions ==
Krøyer created a pen study, two pastels on cartoon and a small oil on canvas study before embarking ion the final painting. The pen study was already lost before the painting had been completed. One of the pastels belong to the Danish Association of Engineers. The other one was in August 1995 sold by Bruun Rasmussen to the utility company NESA. It was after the merger with DONG Energy placed in the Energy Museum in Viborg on loan. The oil study is privately owned.

== See also ==
- List of works by Peder Severin Krøyer
