= Roses (Krøyer) =

Painting by Peder Severin Krøyer

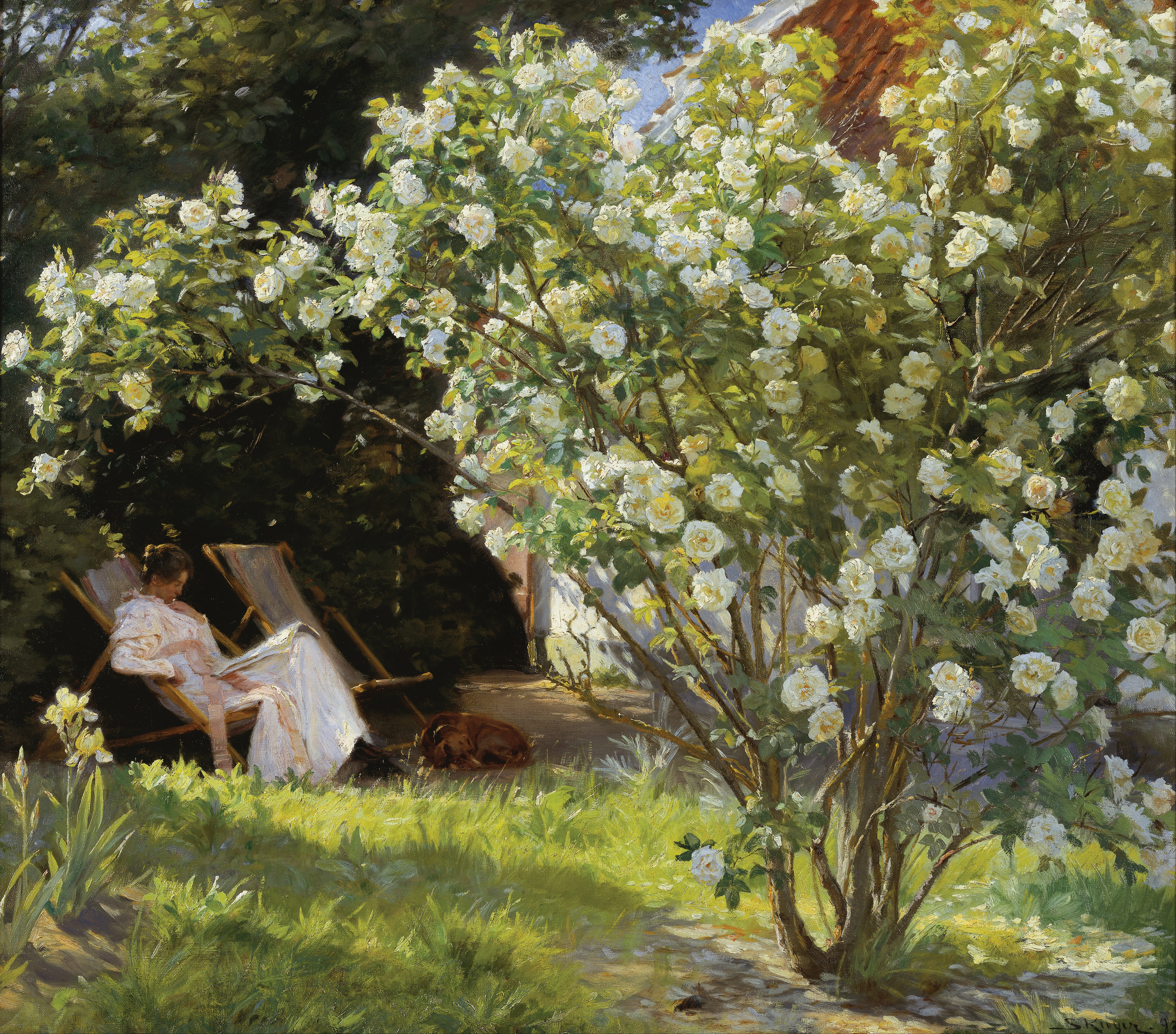
- Artist: Peder Severin Krøyer
- Year: 1893
- Medium: oil on canvas
- Dimensions: 67.5 cm × 76.5 cm (26.6 in × 30.1 in)
- Location: Skagens Museum; Skagens, Denmark

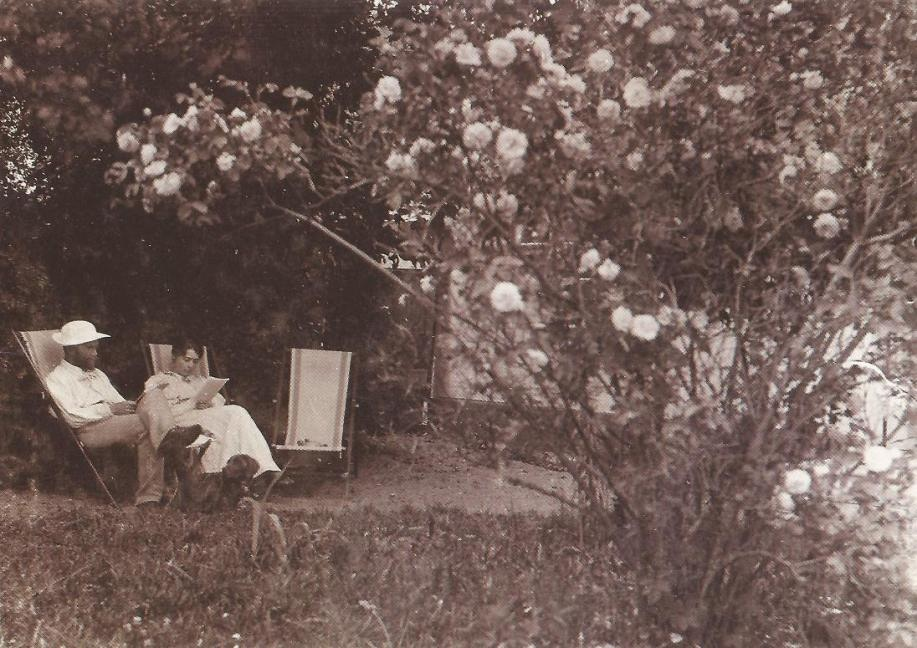
A similar scene with Peder, Marie and Rap in the garden taken at around the same time

Roses (Danish: Roser) is an 1893 painting by P. S. Krøyer, one of the most successful artists of the community known as the Skagen Painters which flourished in Skagen in the north of Jutland in the late 19th century. The work shows Marie Krøyer, the artist's wife, seated in a deckchair under a large rose bush in the garden of a house they rented in Skagen, with their dog Rap asleep beside her.

== Background ==
The Skagen Painters were a close-knit group of mainly Danish artists who gathered each summer from the late 1870s in the fishing village of Skagen in the far north of Jutland, painting the local fishermen and their own family life, gatherings and celebrations. Peder Severin Krøyer (1851–1909), who was born in Stavanger, Norway, but brought up in Copenhagen, first arrived in Skagen in 1882 and returned almost every summer, finally settling there permanently after marrying Marie Triepcke in 1889. He had already gained a reputation for his paintings of the fishermen in Hornbæk on the north coast of Zealand and had been influenced by the Impressionist movement during his travels to France. In Skagen, he became one of the central and most enthusiastic members of the artistic community creating masterpieces emphasizing the special effects of the local light, particularly in his beach scenes, and painting several memorable works recording the lively gatherings of the artists.

== Painting ==
The work is oil on canvas and it measures 67.5 by 76.5 centimetres (26.6 in × 30.1 in). It is one of a number of paintings, photo studies and sketches that Krøyer made between 1891 and 1894 while he and his wife were renting a house from Madam Bendsen in Skagen's Vesterby; its full title is often given in English as some close variation on Roses. Marie Krøyer seated in the deckchair in the garden by Mrs Bendsen's house (or in Danish Roser. Haveparti fra Skagen med kunstnerens hustru siddende i en havestol). One of the sketches on a similar theme is in the Skagens Museum, and the Hirschsprung Collection has a couple of photographs taken around the same time. Roses was completed in the same year as Summer Evening on Skagen's Southern Beach which shows Marie and Anna Ancher strolling on the beach as the sun sets.

In Roses the treatment of the light and shadow shows the influence that the French Impressionist movement had on Krøyer. The foreground is dominated by the huge exuberant Alba Maxima rosebush which obscures most of the house in the background. The variety, of which there is still an example in the grounds of Skagens Museum, does not flower for long but the blooms have an "absolutely fantastic scent" according to Lisette Vind Ebbesen, the museum's director, who says that Krøyer has captured the bush so perfectly that "one can almost smell those roses". Marie, framed by the overhanging roses, is shown reading a newspaper; to her left is another empty deckchair which was probably where Krøyer would have sat. The Krøyer's dog, Rap, who featured in many of Krøyer's works (such as the 1892 Summer Evening at Skagen. The Artist's Wife and Dog by the Shore and Summer Evening at Skagen Beach – The Artist and his Wife of 1899), lies sleeping at Marie's feet.

== Provenance ==
In 1895, the painting was exhibited at Charlottenborg and was included in a pamphlet entitled "Summer" (Danish: Sommer) with Holger Drachmann's poem "Sommervise". When Krøyer's estate was auctioned in 1910 it passed into private ownership. It was sold for 3.1 million Danish kroner in 1985 and was donated anonymously to the Skagens Museum in 2008.

== See also ==
- List of works by Peder Severin Krøyer
