= Men of Skagen on a Summer Evening in Fair Weather =

1848 painting by Martinus Rørbye

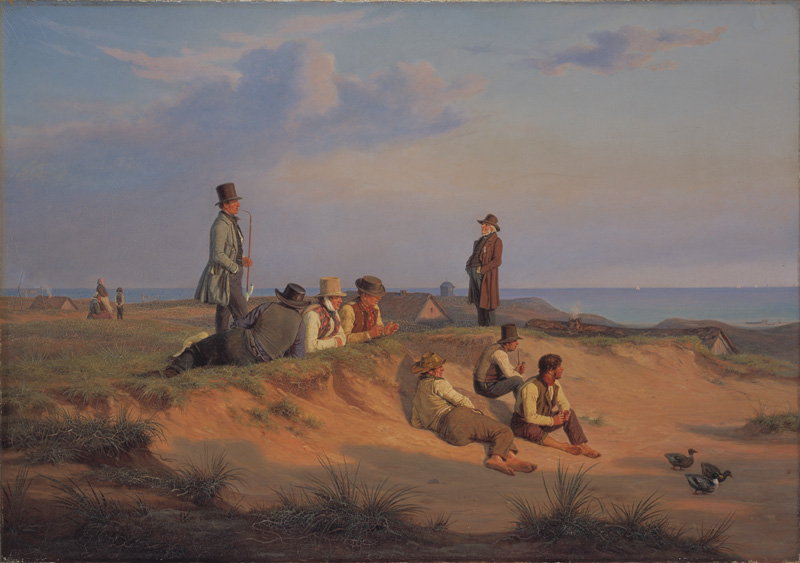
Martinus Rørbye: Men of Skagen on a Summer Evening in Fair Weather

Men of Skagen on a Summer Evening in Fair Weather (Danish: Mænd af Skagen en sommeraften i godt vejr) is an 1848 painting by Martinus Rørbye, one of the central figures of the Golden Age of Danish Painting.

== Background ==
Rørbye was one of the first artists to visit Skagen. His first visit was in 1833, his second in 1847. As one of the foremost Danish artists of his day, he travelled widely in Norway, Greece and Turkey. One of Eckersberg's favourite pupils, he is one of the central figures of the Danish Golden Age.

After Rørbye had exhibited Men of Skagen on a Summer Evening in Fair Weather in Charlottenborg, the painting was purchased by Frederik VII for the royal collection. It is now owned by the Danish National Gallery but has been placed in Skagens Museum since 1983. Measuring 87 x 124 cm, the work demonstrates Rørbye's mastery of harmonic landscapes with its balanced approach to colour and composition. It is typical of the manner in which the Golden Age painters depicted the reality of the Danish countryside.
