= Marie Krøyer =

Danish painter (1867–1940)

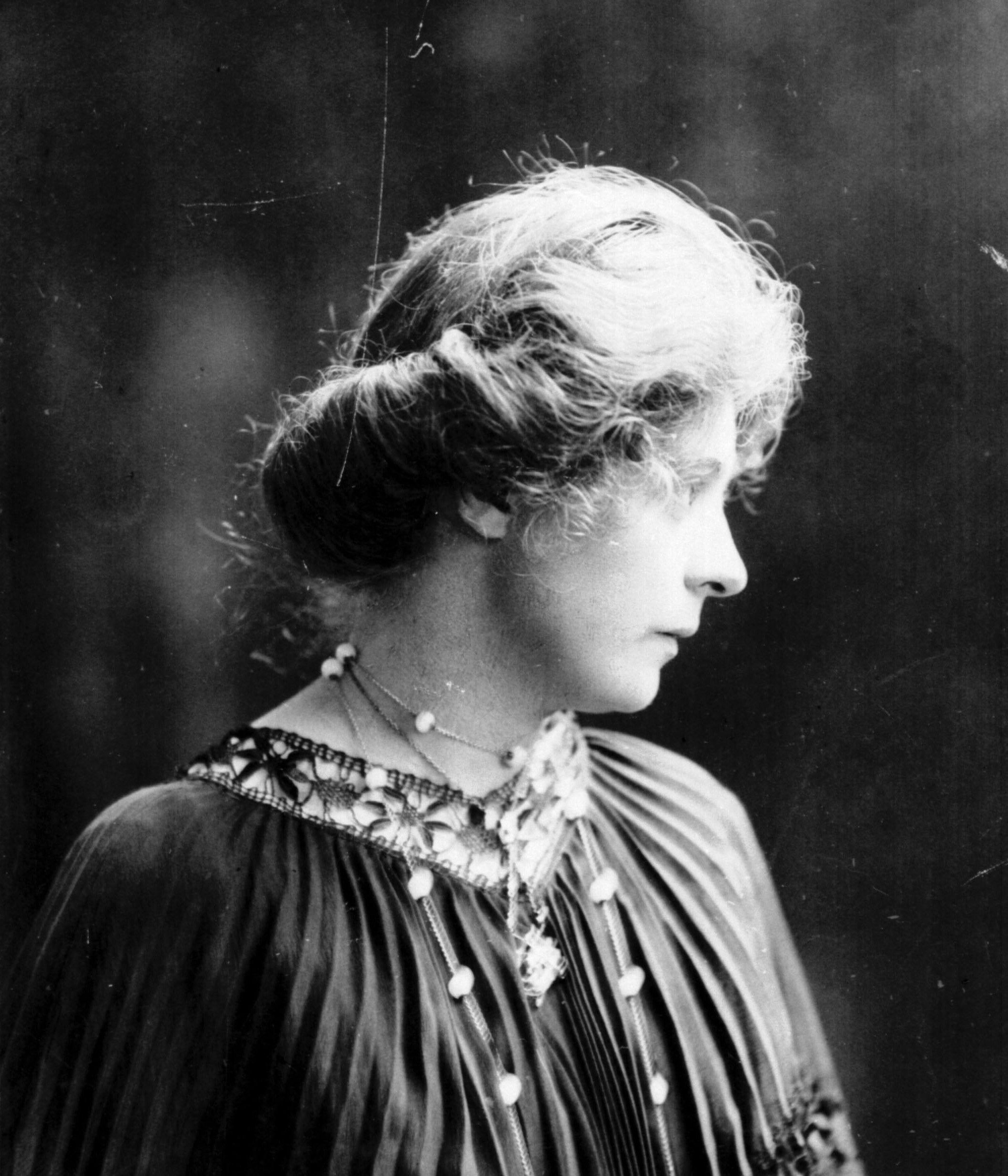
- Kroyer in 1905
- Born: Marie Triepcke; 11 June 1867; Frederiksberg, Denmark
- Died: May 25, 1940 (aged 72); Stockholm, Stockholm County, Sweden
- Known for: Painting, Architecture, Design

Marie Triepcke Krøyer Alfvén (11 June 1867 – 25 May 1940) commonly known as Marie Krøyer, was a Danish painter. She is remembered principally as the wife of Peder Severin Krøyer, one of the most successful members of the artists' colony known as the Skagen Painters, which flourished at the end of the 19th century in the far north of Jutland. Marie was also a part of the small group of Danish painters in her own right. From an early age, Marie aspired to become an artist, and after training privately in Copenhagen she went to Paris to continue her studies. There she was educated in the principles of Naturalism, and was influenced greatly by the French Impressionists. It was there, in early 1889, that she met Krøyer, who immediately fell madly in love with her. Although he was sixteen years her senior, the couple married that summer and in 1891 settled in Skagen. Clearly inspired by Marie's beauty, Krøyer had ample opportunity to paint her portraits both indoors and outdoors, especially on the beach. Married life became more difficult as Krøyer experienced periods of mental illness from 1900, and Marie eventually began an affair with the Swedish composer Hugo Alfvén who had also been taken by her beauty. The couple had a child, Marie divorced Krøyer and moved to Sweden with Alfvén. They married in 1912, but marital problems once again resulted in divorce. Marie was reluctant to paint after meeting Krøyer, whom she looked up to as a far more competent artist, and she is remembered more as the subject of some of his best-known paintings than for her own work, although several of her pictures have recently attracted renewed interest. She is now also recognized for her significant contributions to design and architecture.

== Early life and education ==
Born in Frederiksberg, Marie was the daughter of Max Triepcke, the technical director at the J. H. Rubens Loomery, and his wife Minna Augusta Kindler, who had emigrated to Denmark from Germany in 1866. She enjoyed a comfortable, middle-class life growing up in the Triepcke home, along with her two brothers Wilhelm and Valdemar. A childhood schoolfriend, Ida Hirschsprung, brought Marie into social contact with Heinrich and Pauline Hirschsprung, Ida's aunt and uncle. Heinrich Hirschsprung, a prominent businessman who ran a successful tobacco manufacturing business, was a patron of the arts and had shown an early interest in P. S. Krøyer.

From an early age, Marie showed a great interest in art, aspiring to become a painter. It was very difficult in those days for women to train as artists, but she was talented and enjoyed the support of her parents. She studied privately under Carl Thomsen in the 1880s and was helped along the way by Bertha Wegmann, a leading portrait artist of the day, for whom she modeled at sixteen years of age. As there were no public schools for female artists, Marie had the idea of saving on the expense of private tuition by gathering a group of other young aspiring women, renting a studio, and asking the best art teachers to come and give them occasional tips. Among the artists that sometimes stopped by were Laurits Tuxen and Marie's future husband, Peder Severin Krøyer, though Krøyer was dismissive of the "young lady painters" school. In June 1888, Marie became engaged to Robert Hirschsprung, the son of Heinrich and Pauline, but he was prone to fits of deep depression and appears to have broken off the engagement soon afterwards. In 1887, she paid her first brief visit to Skagen, but there are no records of works created by her on that occasion.

In December 1888, Marie went to Paris where, in the spring of 1889, she studied side by side with Anna Ancher at the Pierre Puvis de Chavannes atelier. Anna Ancher, a fellow Dane from Skagen in the north of Jutland, became a lifelong friend. Marie Krøyer also studied in the ateliers of Gustave Courtois and Alfred Philippe Roll, discovering Impressionism and Naturalism, which would strongly influence her own style of painting. Always keen to support better conditions for female artists, she was among the first to exhibit at Den Frie Udstilling (The Free Exhibition) in 1891, an alternative to the academy's Charlottenborg.

Marie also befriended the painters Harald Slott-Møller and his wife Agnes Rambusch. Agnes would contribute a lifetime of support and encouragement for Marie's artistic pursuits. Other friends with whom she maintained exhaustive correspondence include Georg Brandes, critic and scholar, whom she admired, and the poet Sophus Schandorf and his wife, who treated Marie like a daughter.

== Paintings ==
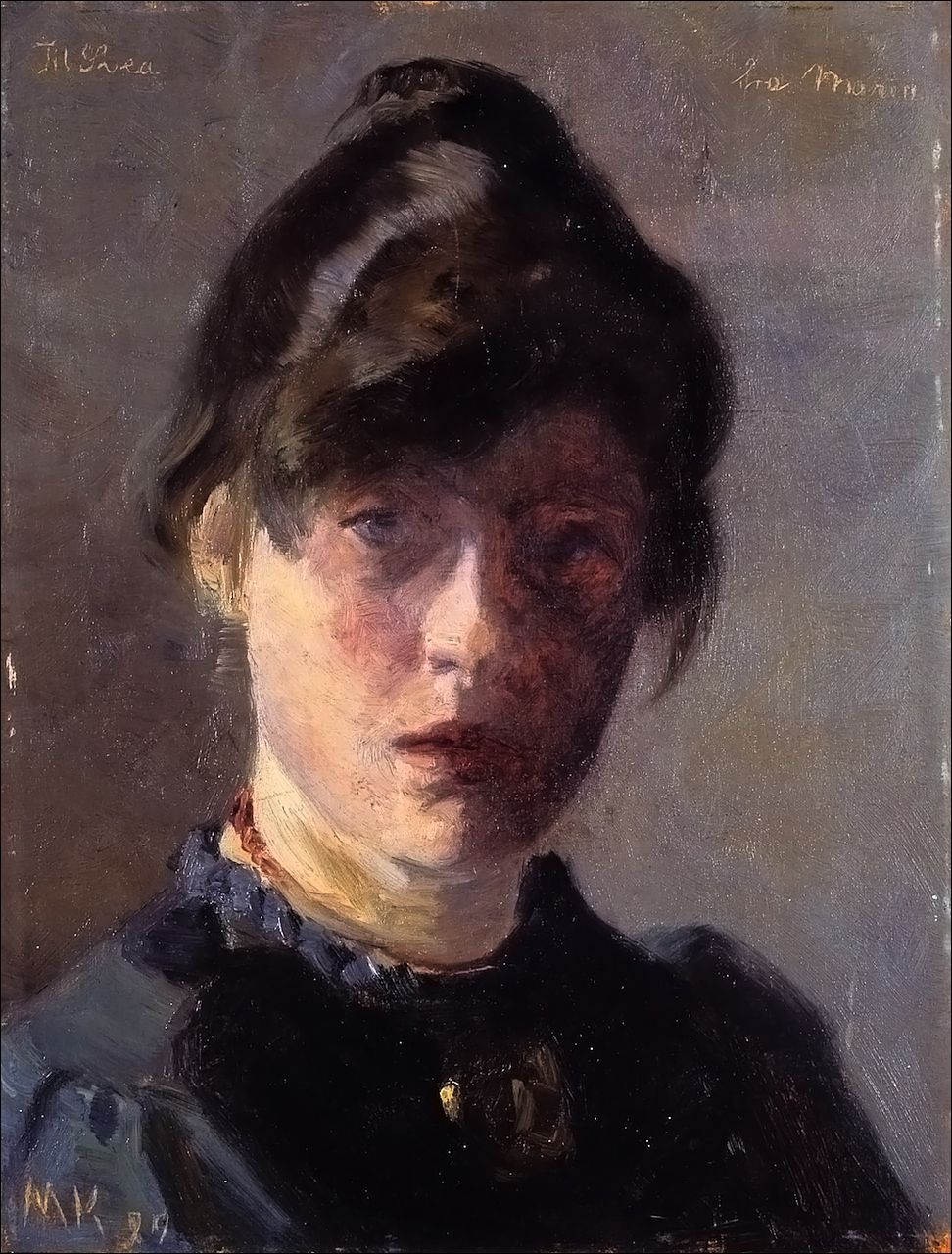
Marie Krøyer: Self-portrait (1889)

While she was with Krøyer, Marie painted little; she considered her talent inferior and felt frustrated that she could not commit herself fully to art because she had accepted that her role was to be a housewife and mother, saying: "I sometimes think that the whole effort is in vain, we have far too much to overcome ... what significance does it really have if I paint, I shall never, never achieve anything really great ... I want to believe in our cause, even if at times it may be terribly difficult." By contrast, her friend Anna Ancher enjoyed a more positive relationship with her own husband; she was not concerned by domestic duties, and their artistic styles and motifs were so different that direct comparison was never a problem.

Only a small number of Marie's paintings survive, most on small canvases; Lisa Svanholm believes the absence of large works is further evidence of Marie's lack of confidence in her talent. Of particular interest are her Impressionistic Self-Portrait (1889), in which she conveys a rather sombre view of herself, emphasized by the thick brushstrokes and the shadow cast over most of her face, and her last known painting, the Marketplace in a French Town (Markedsplads i en fransk by) of 1898, a small Impressionist piece which shows her talent to the full.

Although Marie Krøyer was recognized for her personal beauty during her lifetime, it was not until the death of her daughter Vibeke in 1986 that her talents as an artist were revealed. The paintings left by Vibeke, now in Skagens Museum, showed her mother was a fine painter who had possessed the unrealized potential to become one of Skagen's leading artists This was further evidenced in 2002, in connection with the publication of Tonni Arnold's book Kunsten i Marie Krøyers liv (Art in Marie Krøyer's Life), when an exhibition of some of her hitherto unknown works, 40 paintings and 20 sketches, was held in Copenhagen's Kunstforeningen after the author had tracked them down in Sweden. Arnold commented: "It is quite clear she tried to succeed as a painter but circumstances were against her. After Krøyer was hit by mental illness, she gave up... But now we know that for lengthy periods she seriously strove to be a painter, that she travelled on her own, and that something came out of it all."

Several works by Marie Krøyer are in the collection at Skagens Museum.

== Decorative talents ==
Marie Krøyer was inspired by the Scottish designer Charles Rennie Mackintosh to design furniture. When she and her husband moved into the town clerk's house in Skagen Vesterby in 1895, she designed the furniture and the interiors, as she did when they acquired their Copenhagen home in Bergensgade. Some of her pieces of furniture are now in the National Museum of Denmark. As she subscribed to the journal The Studio, she could also follow developments by William Morris and Edward Burne-Jones, who were members of the Arts and Crafts movement. Her interests extended to fireplaces, woven fabrics, kitchen fittings and wall panels, inspiring the Skagen architect Ulrik Plesner to take account of her plans in his own work.

She was also the architect behind Alfvénsgaard, the house she and Alfvén shared in Tällberg, Sweden. In 1905, after Krøyer had finally given her a divorce, she moved to Dalarna in Sweden where Alfvén had bought a large piece of land beside Lake Siljan. Reacting against industrialization, Swedish intellectuals supporting nature and old building traditions had moved to the area. Marie planned their new home, Alfvénsgaard, combining local Swedish building traditions with interiors in the Art Nouveau style while taking account of Danish craftsmanship. The local craftsmen complied although they were not used to taking orders from a woman.

== Marriage with Krøyer ==
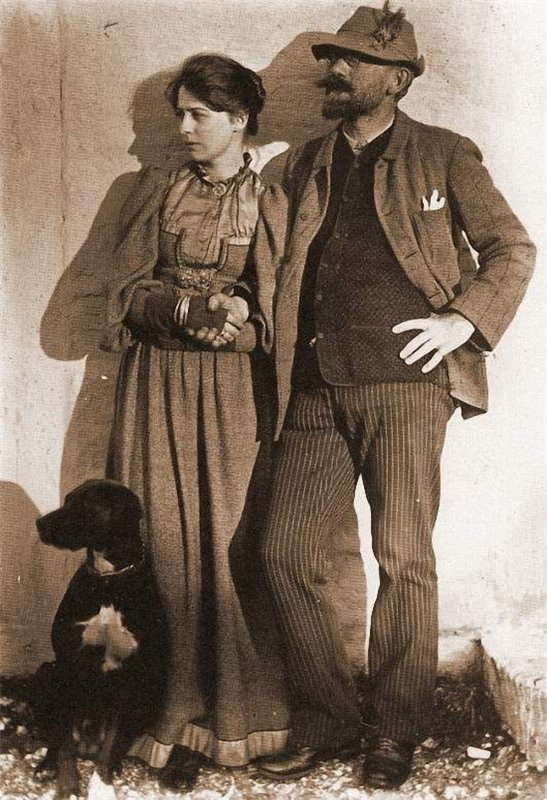
Marie with Peder Severin Krøyer and their dog, Rap, photographed in Skagen (1892)

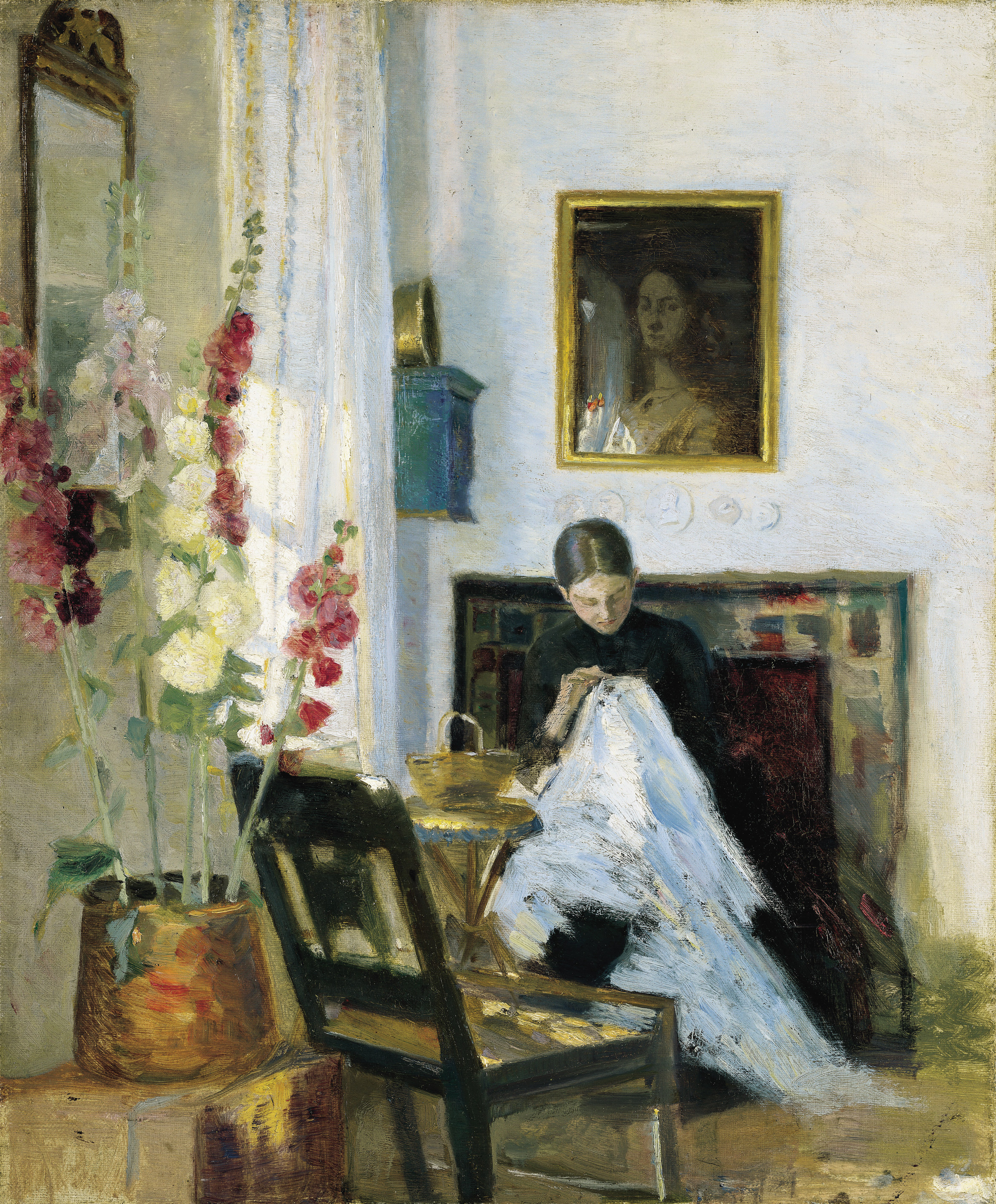
Marie Kroyer, Interior with Girl Sewing (undated)

Shortly after arriving in Paris in December 1888, Marie ran into Krøyer at the Café de la Régence, a favorite with the many Danish artists living in the city at the end of the 1880s. She waved at Krøyer, who was walking past, recognizing him from his occasional visits to the ladies' classes in Copenhagen and from the sittings when she modeled for the painting A Duet (1887). Krøyer, who did not particularly remember her from Copenhagen, immediately fell madly in love with her. Following their engagement on 7 May, they were married on 23 July 1889 at the Triepkes' home in Augsburg, Germany. (The Triepkes had been forced to move back to Germany in 1888 on account of the father's loss of employment.) They spent their honeymoon in Stenbjerg, a fishing village in the northwest of Jutland on the former island of Thy, avoiding the attention of the artists in Skagen. It was there that Krøyer painted the first in a long series of portraits of his wife.

They then traveled extensively in Italy where they visited Amalfi and Ravello. While she was there, Marie contracted typhoid, which discouraged her from doing much painting, though one surviving work of Marie's from this trip is a study of a little Italian girl. The couple returned to Denmark in December 1890. After periods spent in Copenhagen and Hornbæk they went to Skagen in May 1891. For the next few years, they spent their summers in Skagen and their winters in Copenhagen. While in Skagen, they first stayed in Brøndums Hotel, but from 1894 they rented a house in Skagens Vesterby, and in 1895 they moved into a house of their own in Byfogedskoven. The summers Krøyer spent with his wife in the 1890s were clearly a source of inspiration for him, especially as Marie had a strong sense of beauty herself, often quoting Keats' "Beauty is truth, truth beauty".

Her marriage with Krøyer apparently diminished Marie's ambitions to make a name for herself as a painter. Indeed, only one work can be said with certainty to have been painted by her in Skagen. Instead, she concentrated on enhancing their summer residence, designing various pieces of furniture, just as she did while they spent their winters at their home in Copenhagen's Bergensgade.

Exactly what discouraged Marie from painting is not very clear, but there is little evidence she received any encouragement from Krøyer. From her correspondence, it can be seen she lacked self-confidence and had problems with her health. She also appears to have suffered from post-natal depression after her daughter Vibeke was born in 1895. Several of her friends and associates described her as rather withdrawn, often complaining of headaches and retiring to bed, perhaps as a result of her marital problems.

While Vibeke was still a small child, Krøyer's health started to deteriorate with bouts of mental illness, making the marriage increasingly difficult. In 1900, he was admitted to the mental hospital in Middelfart, the first of many lengthy stays. The couple spent less and less time together and often travelled alone. It was during a visit Marie made to Taormina, Sicily, in 1902 that she first met Hugo Alfvén.

Marie in P. S. Kroyer's paintings
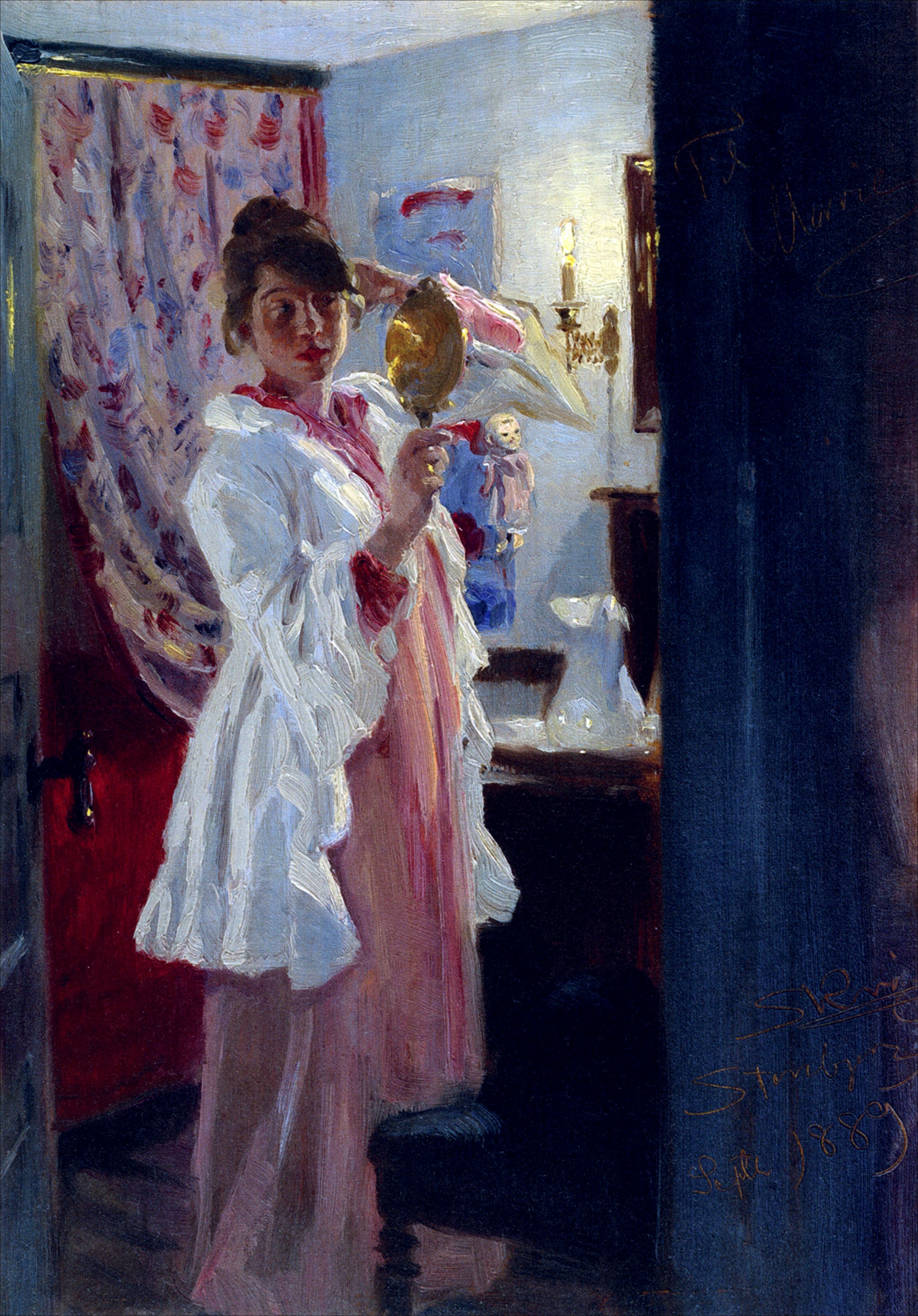
Interior with Marie Krøyer (1889)

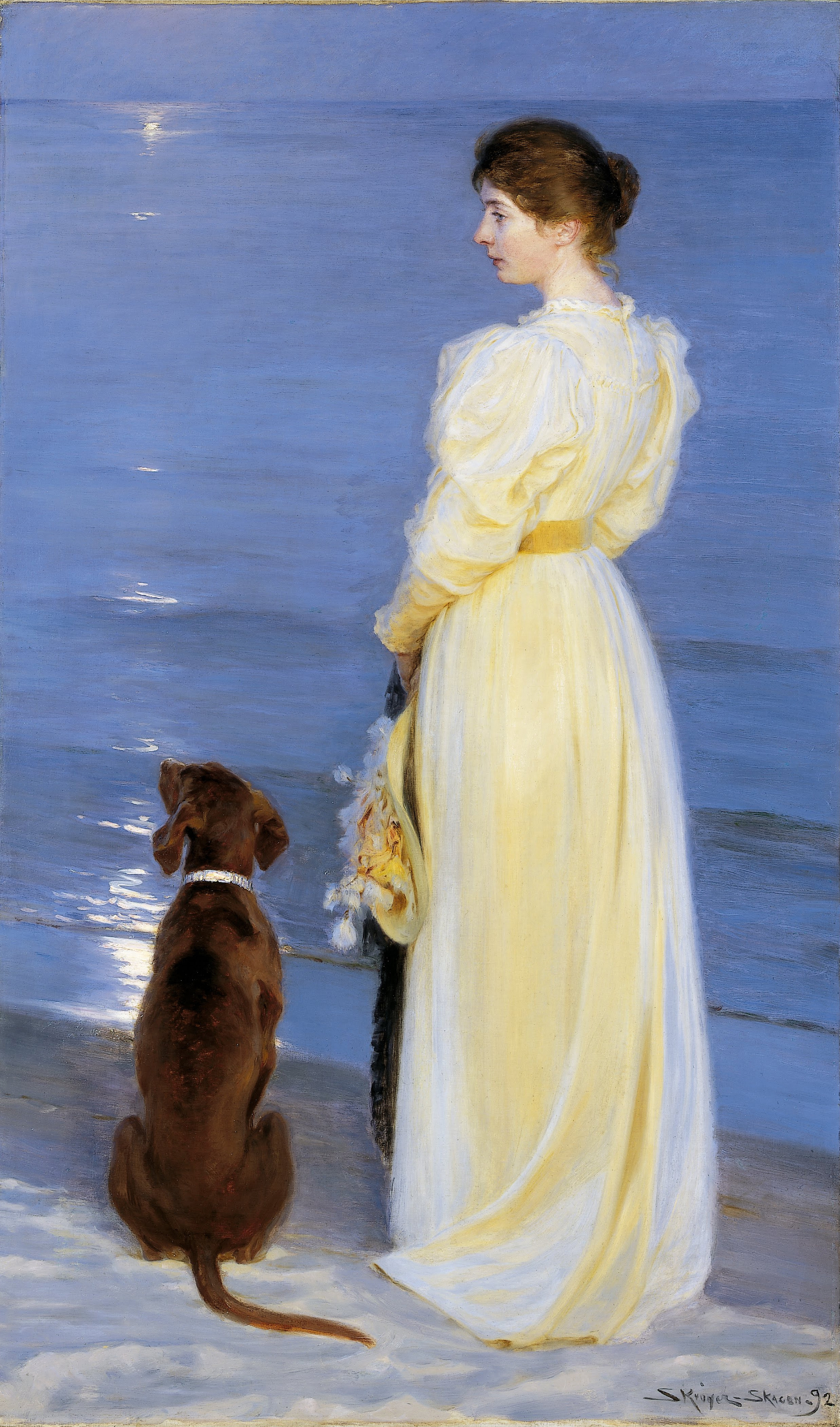
Summer Evening at Skagen. The Artist's Wife and Dog by the Shore (1892)

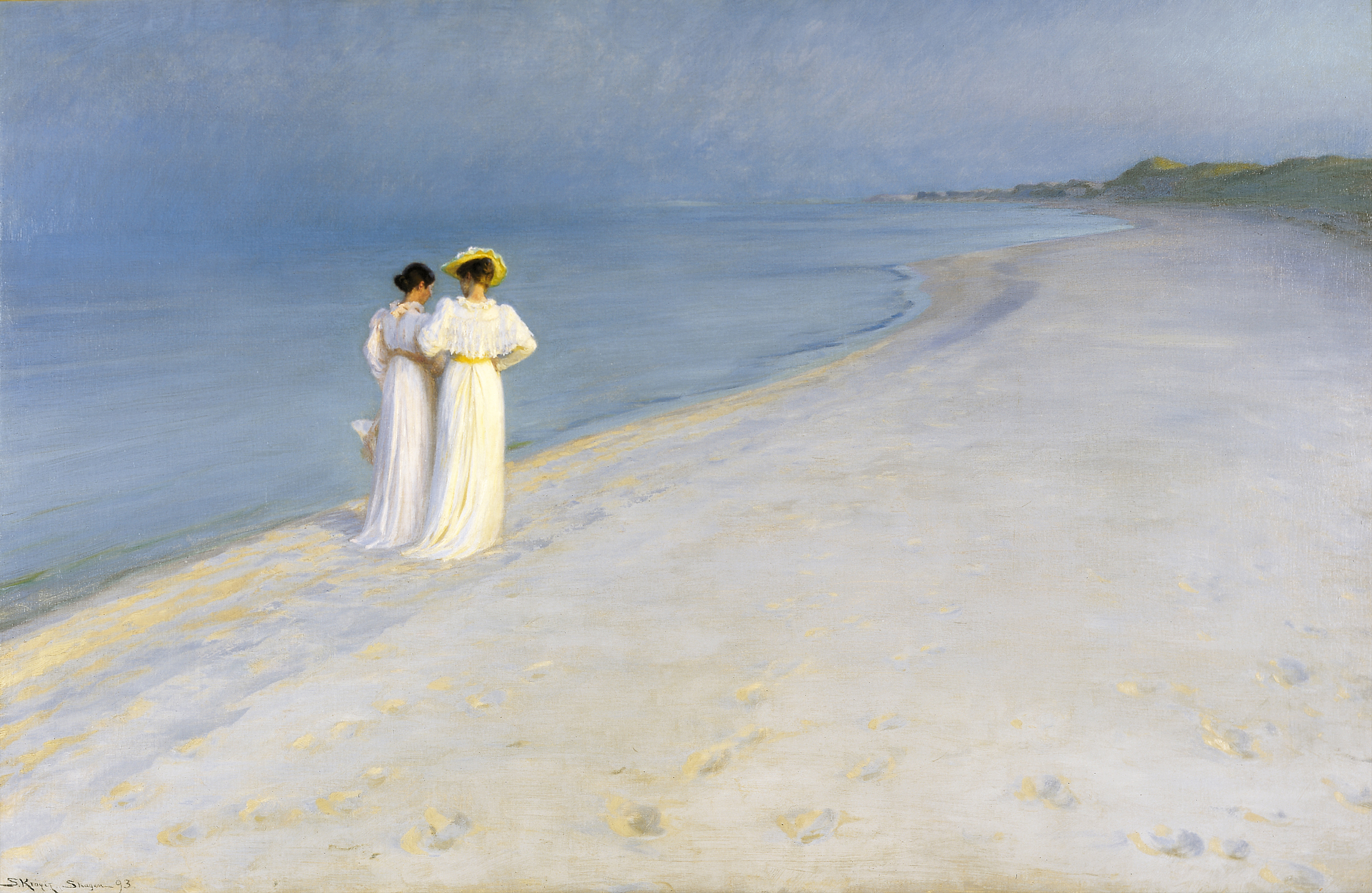
Summer Evening on Skagen's Southern Beach (1893)

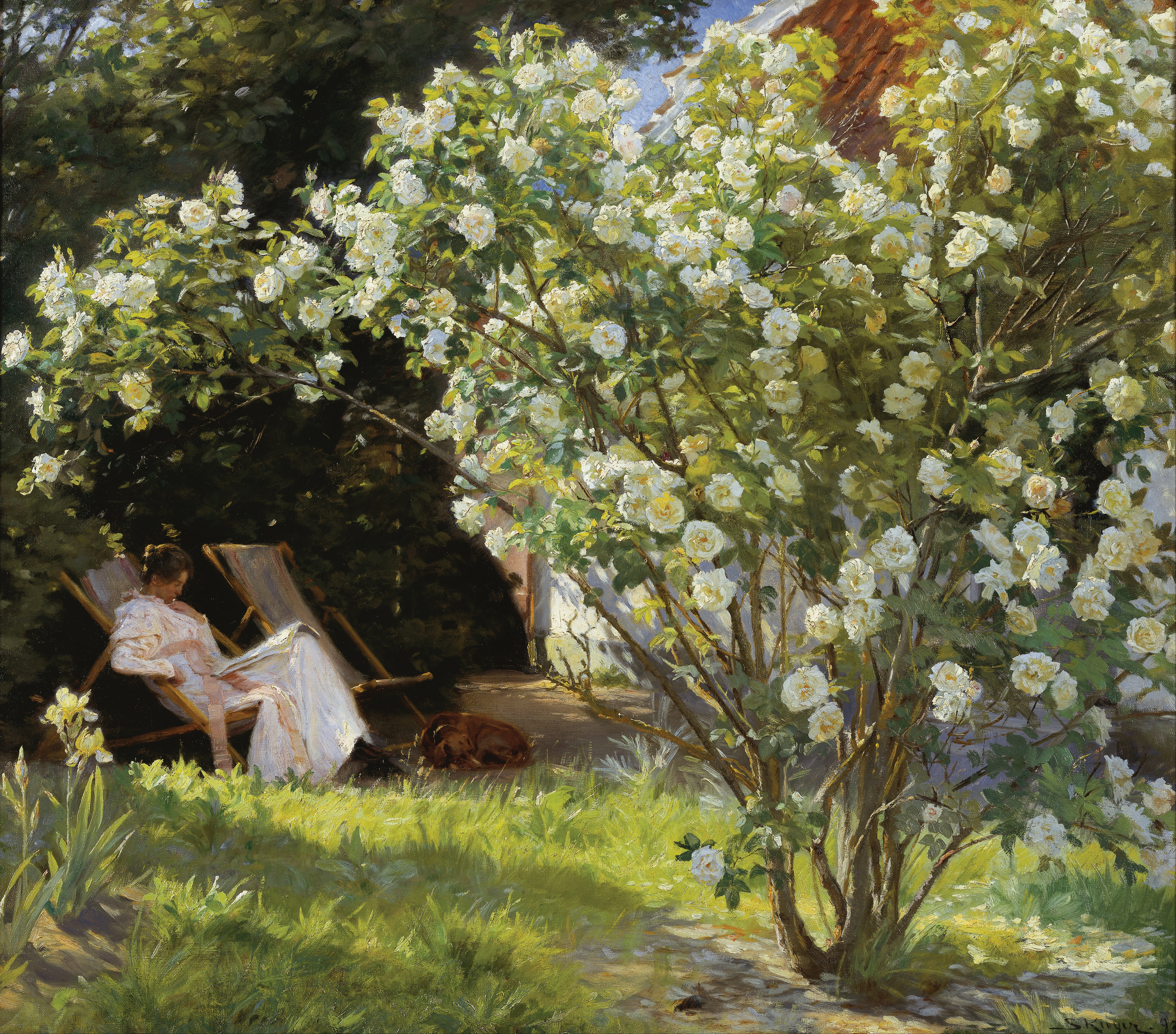
Roses (1893)

Summer Evening at Skagen Beach – The Artist and his Wife (1899).

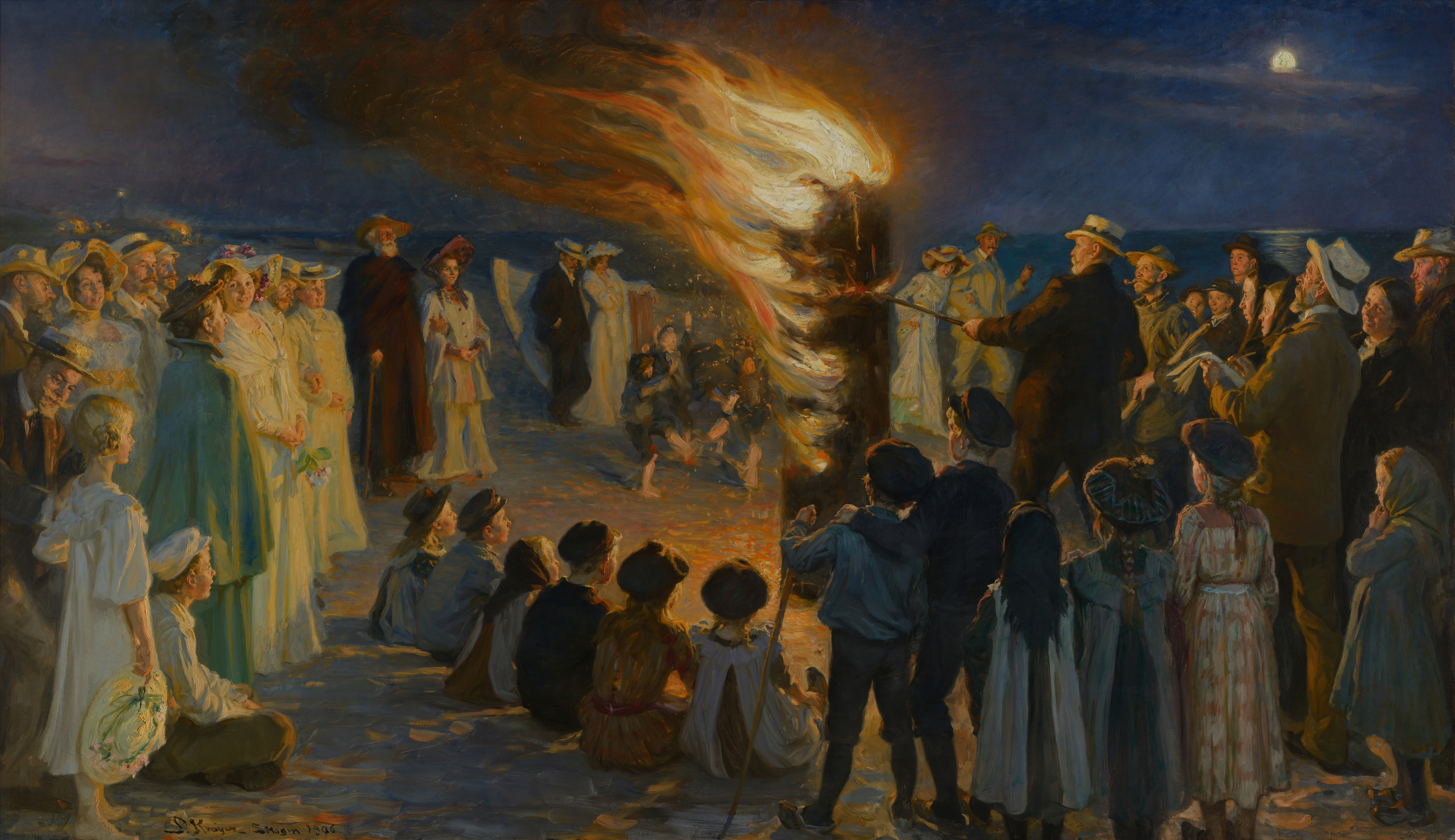
Midsummer Eve Bonfire on Skagen Beach (1906)

== Life with Hugo Alfvén ==
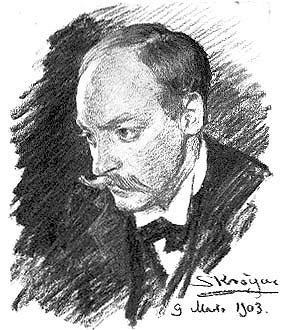
Hugo Alfvén sketched by P. S. Krøyer in 1903

Long before he met Marie, Hugo Alfvén had been struck by her beauty in Krøyer's paintings. After seeing her portraits, he asserted: "I had never seen a more beautiful woman and the grace and elegance of her figure left me utterly bewitched." While she was in Taormina with her daughter Vibeke, Marie wanted her friend the singer Anna Norrie to come and join her. As Norrie was staying with Alfvén in Berlin, Marie invited both of them. Alfvén, five years her junior, began to pursue her immediately, and Marie quickly succumbed. Their affair was so passionate that immediately after her trip to Italy, Marie went to Paris and asked Krøyer for a divorce. Krøyer refused, believing Marie had nothing more than a passing infatuation, and ordered her back to Skagen. Krøyer was mistaken; the relationship persisted, and Marie never missed an opportunity to be together with Alfvén in Skagen, Copenhagen or even Sweden. After she became pregnant in 1905, Krøyer finally acquiesced to the demands for a divorce, but he maintained custody of Vibeke. Most of Krøyer's friends broke off contact with her when, as she wrote, she "committed the inconceivably foolish act of leaving Krøyer – that good, magnanimous and delightful man"; only Michael and Anna Ancher remained her close friends.

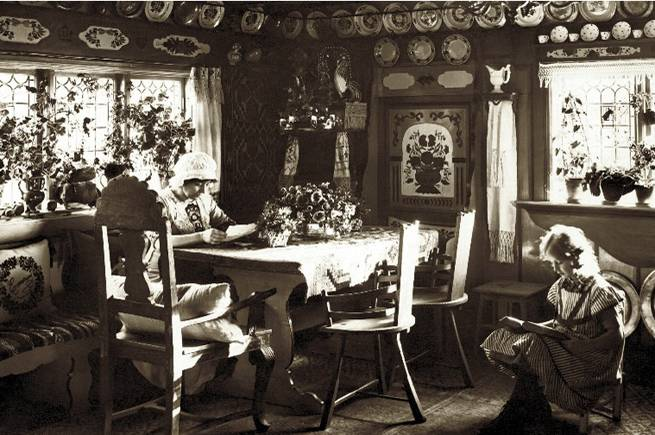
Marie Krøyer with Margita, Alfvéngaard, c. 1912

Marie's second daughter, Margita, was born in Copenhagen in 1905. She spent two years raising the child there until she joined Alfvén in Sweden in 1907. Krøyer, whose health had worsened since the divorce, died in Skagen in November 1909; Marie, now calling herself Marie Alfvén, returned for the funeral although she had been asked to stay away.

Alfvén had first been hesitant to marry Marie, fearing repercussions on his career as a choirmaster. The wedding finally took place on 30 January 1912 in Uppsala, after which the couple moved into a new house, Alfvéngården, in Tällberg. Built entirely to her own design, Alfvéngården can be considered Marie Krøyer's masterpiece, especially as she also created the furniture and interiors, and she designed a number of beautiful little buildings in the local style around the estate.

Once again, Marie had become a partner in an unhappy marriage. Even before the wedding, she had discovered Alfvén had been unfaithful to her with a number of women, but she went ahead with the wedding anyway for Margita's sake. Alfvén became increasingly unstable, requesting a divorce in 1928. Marie at first refused, but after ever more serious difficulties in their relationship and numerous courtroom disputes, the couple finally divorced in 1936. Alfvéngården, a major point of contention, was left to Margita while Marie moved to Stockholm where she lived alone for the remainder of her life.

== Death ==
Marie Krøyer died in Stockholm of cancer on 25 May 1940 and is buried in Leksand cemetery in central Sweden, not far from Alfvéngaard. Her two daughters, Vibeke and Margita, are buried beside her. Hugo Alfvén's grave is also nearby while Krøyer is buried in Skagen.

== See also ==
- Hip Hip Hurrah! (film) (1987 feature film)
- The Passion of Marie (2012 feature film)
- Skagen Painters

== Sources ==
- Svanholm, Lise (2004). Northern Light: The Skagen Painters. Gyldendal A/S. ISBN 978-87-02-02817-1.

== Literature ==
- Arnold, Anastassia (2010). Balladen om Marie: en biografi om Marie Krøyer (in Danish). Rosinante. ISBN 978-87-638-1229-0.
- Arnold, Tonni (2003). Kunsten i Marie Krøyers liv. Gyldendals Bogklubber. ISBN 978-87-00-69736-2.
- Bøgh Jensen, Mette (2012). Marie Krøyer: der skal mod til at have talent (in Danish). Skagens Museum. ISBN 978-87-91048-30-2.
- Loerges, Margrethe (1980). Marie Krøyer: portræt af kunstnerens hustru (in Danish). Hernov. ISBN 978-87-7215-928-7.
- Svanholm, Lise (2006). Damerne på Skagen (in Danish). Gyldendal A/S. ISBN 978-87-02-04499-7.
- Thage, Jacob; Holtegaard, Gl. (1997). Portraits of a Marriage: Marie and P.S. Krøyer. Skagens Museum. ISBN 978-87-88499-34-6.
