= Summer Evening on Skagen's Southern Beach =

1893 painting by Peder Severin Krøyer

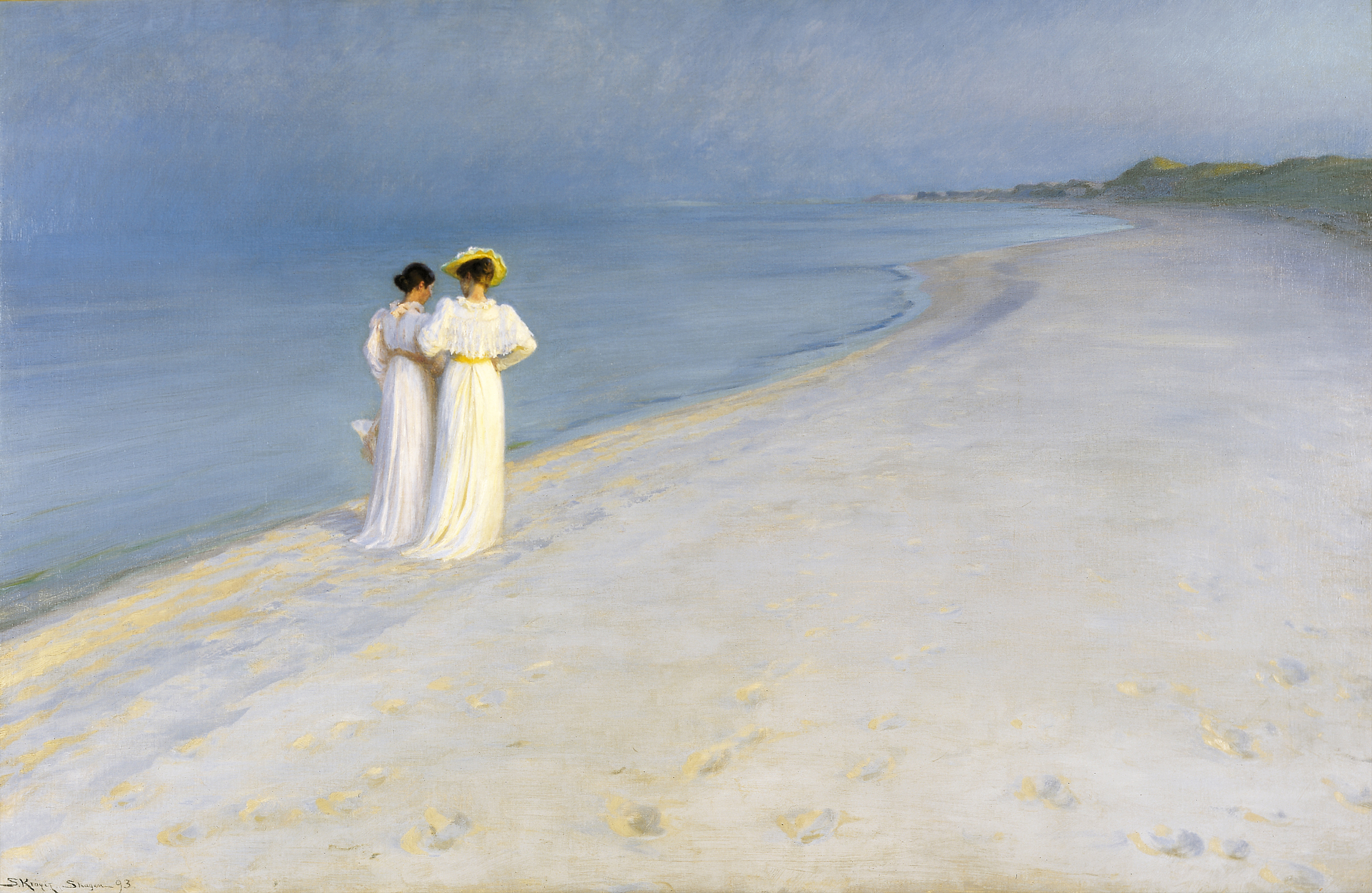
- Artist: P.S. Krøyer
- Year: 1893
- Medium: Oil on canvas
- Dimensions: 100 cm × 150 cm (39 in × 59 in)
- Location: Skagens Museum; Skagen, Denmark

Summer Evening on Skagen's Southern Beach (Danish: Sommeraften på Skagen Sønderstrand) is a painting by Peder Severin Krøyer (1851–1909), from 1893, and is counted as one of his masterpieces. Krøyer was one of the most notable members of the Danish artistic community known as the Skagen Painters. The works of Krøyer often emphasise the special effects of the Skagen light, with several memorable works depicting beach scenes.

== History ==
Peder Severin Krøyer was born in Stavanger, Norway, but spent his childhood with his aunt in Copenhagen, Denmark. The Skagen Painters were a group of Danish artists who formed an artists' colony in the little Danish village of Skagen, where they made a habit of returning to paint every summer, and Krøyer was part of this artistic community. Krøyer started painting in Skagen in the summer of 1882 and settled there permanently in 1889, after marrying Marie Triepcke. He became the central member of the group.

== Painting ==
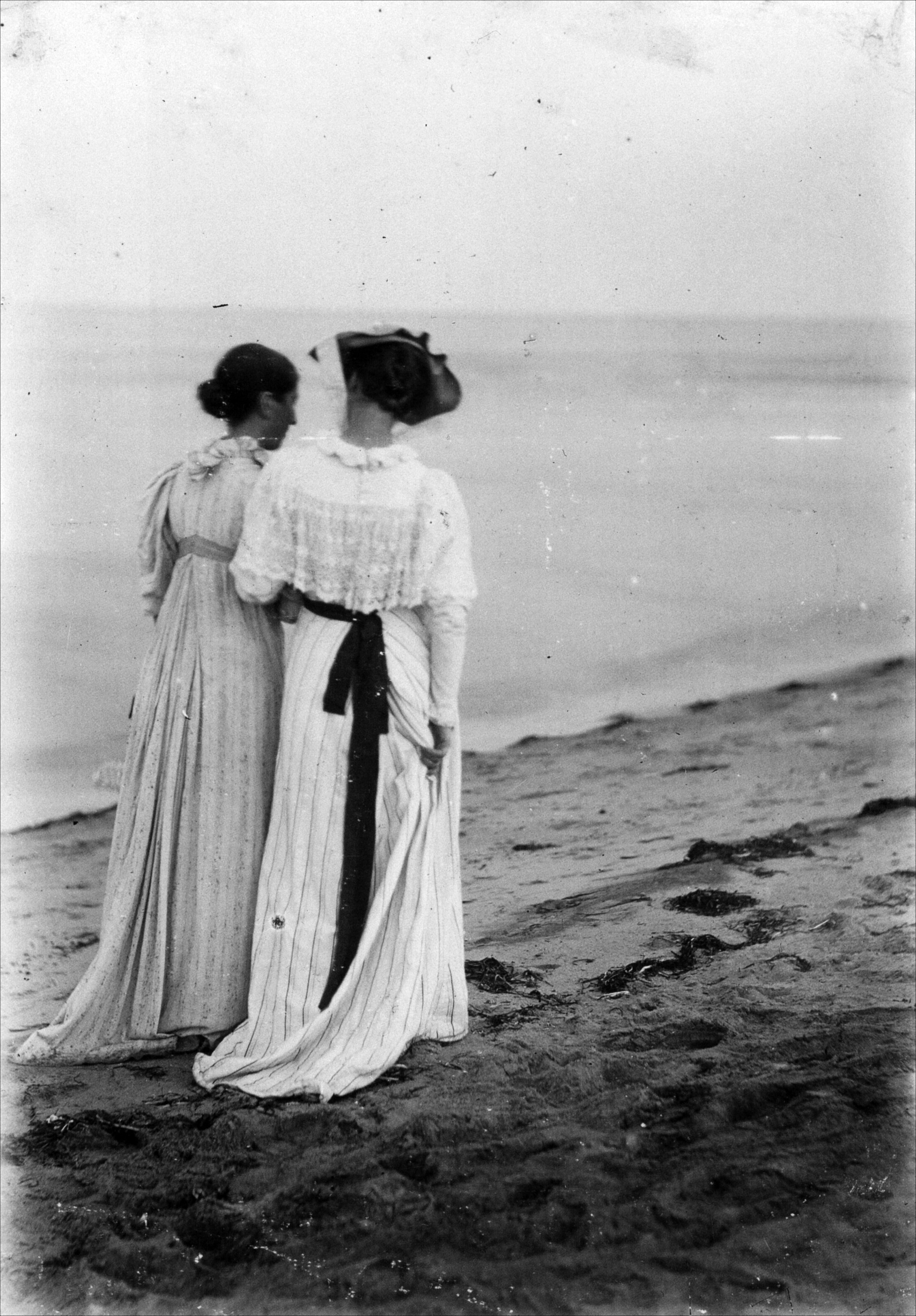
One of Krøyer's photographs of Anna and Marie on the beach

The painting itself was inspired by a walk along the beach by Anna Ancher and Marie Krøyer after a dinner party at the Krøyers' home in the summer of 1892 when the guests had gone down to the shore to enjoy the pleasant evening. In 1990, an exhibition by the Hirschsprung Collection revealed that the painting had in fact been based on photographs of the two ladies taken by Krøyer. Until then, no one had imagined it was related to the artist's interest in photography.

After painting four preparatory works, Krøyer completed the full-size work in September 1893. In a letter to the writer Sophus Schandorph and his wife, who had been guests at the dinner party, he explained: "After I had painted studies of various kinds for it for about a month, one beautiful morning I started to paint up on the canvas and on the evening of the fourth day the picture was as it stands."

The painter Anna Ancher and the artist's wife were strolling on Skagen's Southern Beach during the blue hour, when the horizon is almost dissolved in the evening mist and dispersed blue light, reflected in the sea. Krøyer described the time of the evening when the two sources of natural light could be captured together as a particular favourite.

Krøyer's style was influenced by the Impressionist movement during his travels to France, although he developed a style of his own. In Denmark he gained a reputation particularly for his beach scenes, for his paintings of the fishermen, and lively gatherings of the artists.

== Provenance ==
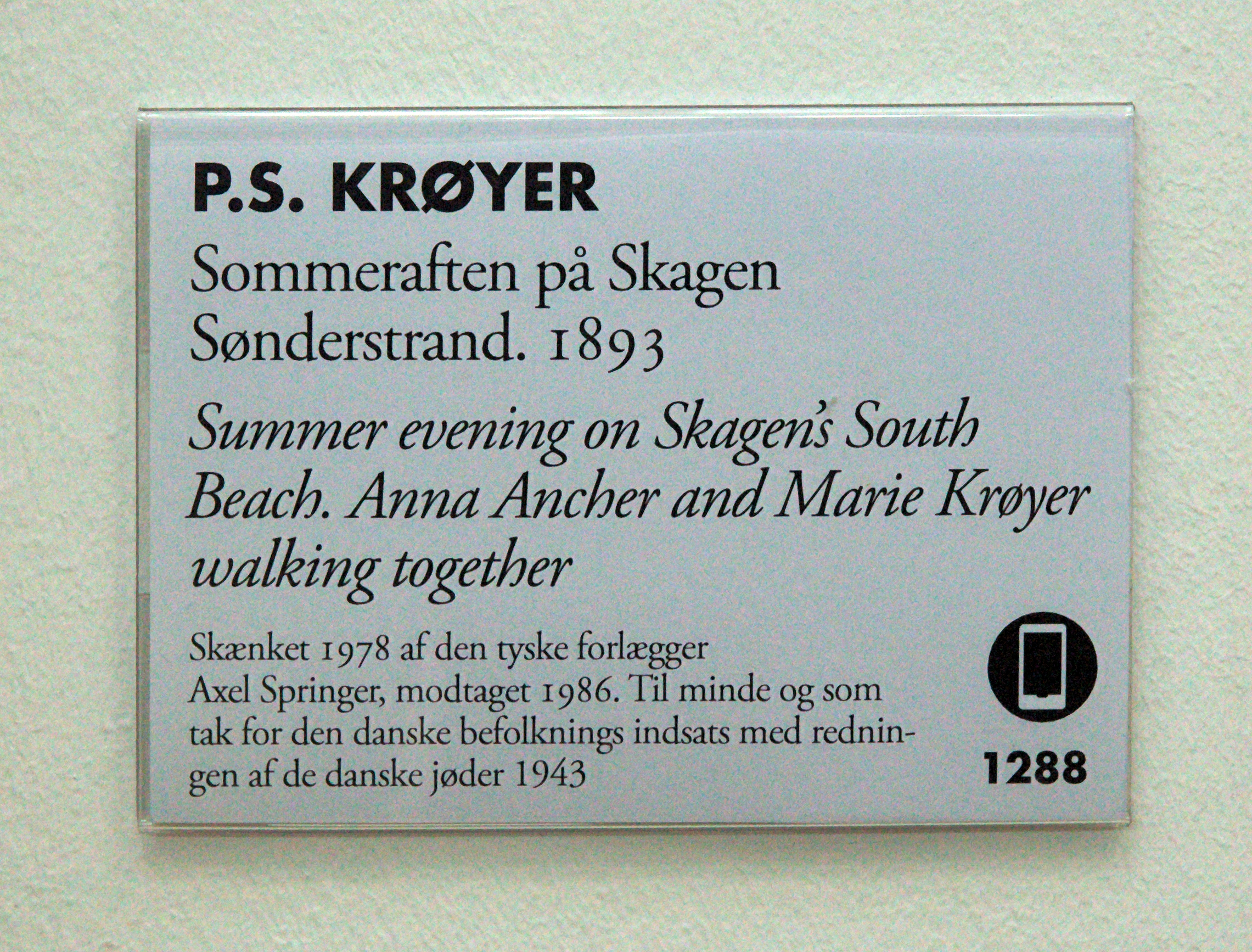
Summer Evening on Skagen's Southern Beach, Skagens Museum

The painting was owned by the opera singer Lilli Lehmann, and in 1978 was sold to the German newspaper magnate Axel Springer for DKK 520,000. In 1986 Springer's widow, not herself Jewish, donated the painting to the Danish people in remembrance of the 1943 rescue of the Danish Jews from the Nazis. At that time Danish civilians together with the Danish resistance movement risked their own lives to evacuate 7,220 of Denmark's 7,800 Jews by sea to nearby neutral Sweden. The painting is held by Skagens Museum.

== Auction of preparatory work ==
In November 2012, one of the preparatory paintings for the main work measuring only 45 by 47 cm was sold by Sotheby's for £493,250, more than twice the estimate. Once owned by Queen Margherita of Italy, the work was rediscovered when her granddaughter Princess Maria Beatrice of Savoy auctioned it at Christie's in April 2012.

== See also ==
- List of works by Peder Severin Krøyer

== Literature ==
- Skagens museum
