= Stenbjerg =

Village in Jutland, Denmark

Coordinates: 56°55′17.27″N 8°21′27.02″E

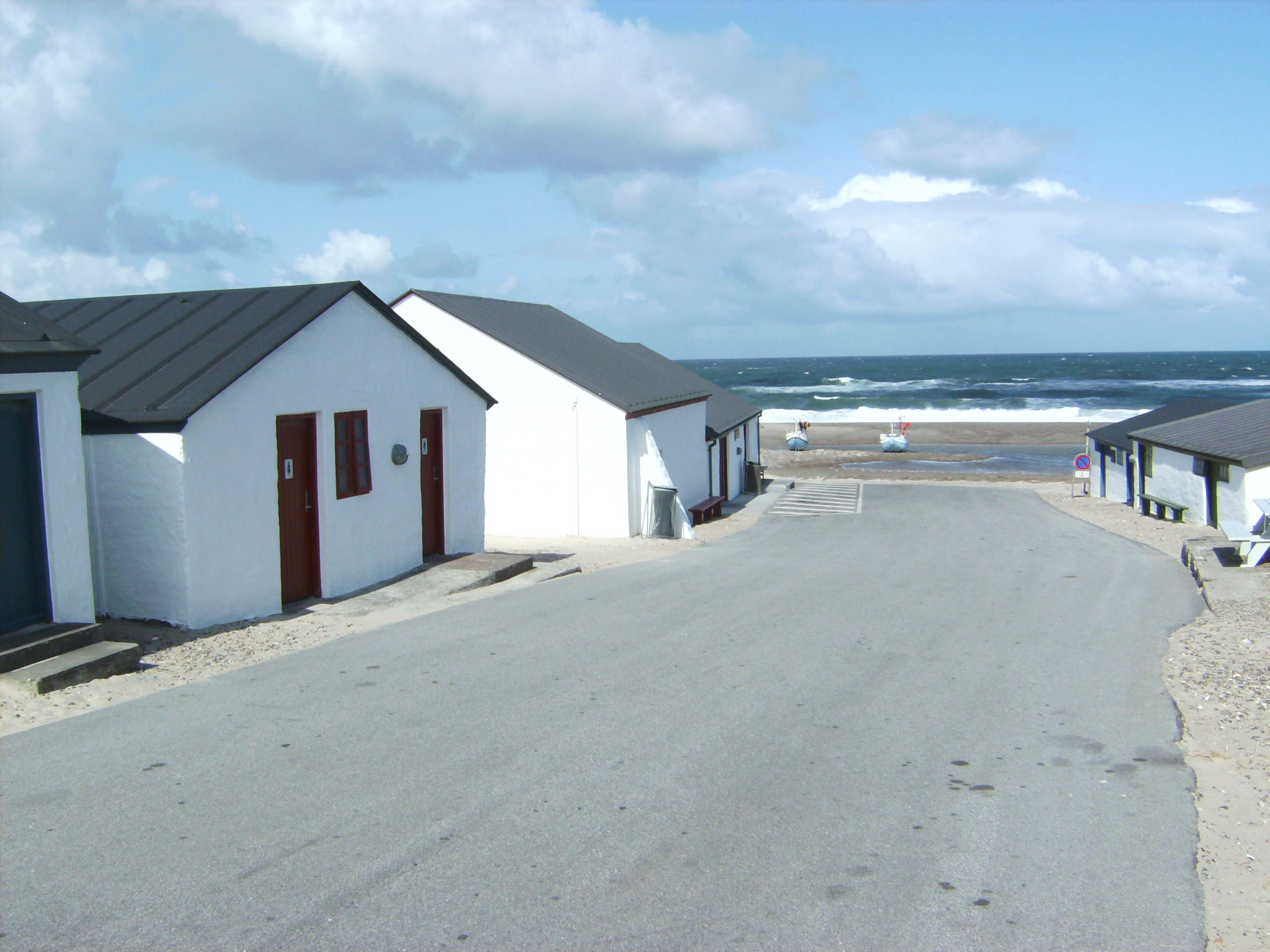
Stenbjerg, Thy

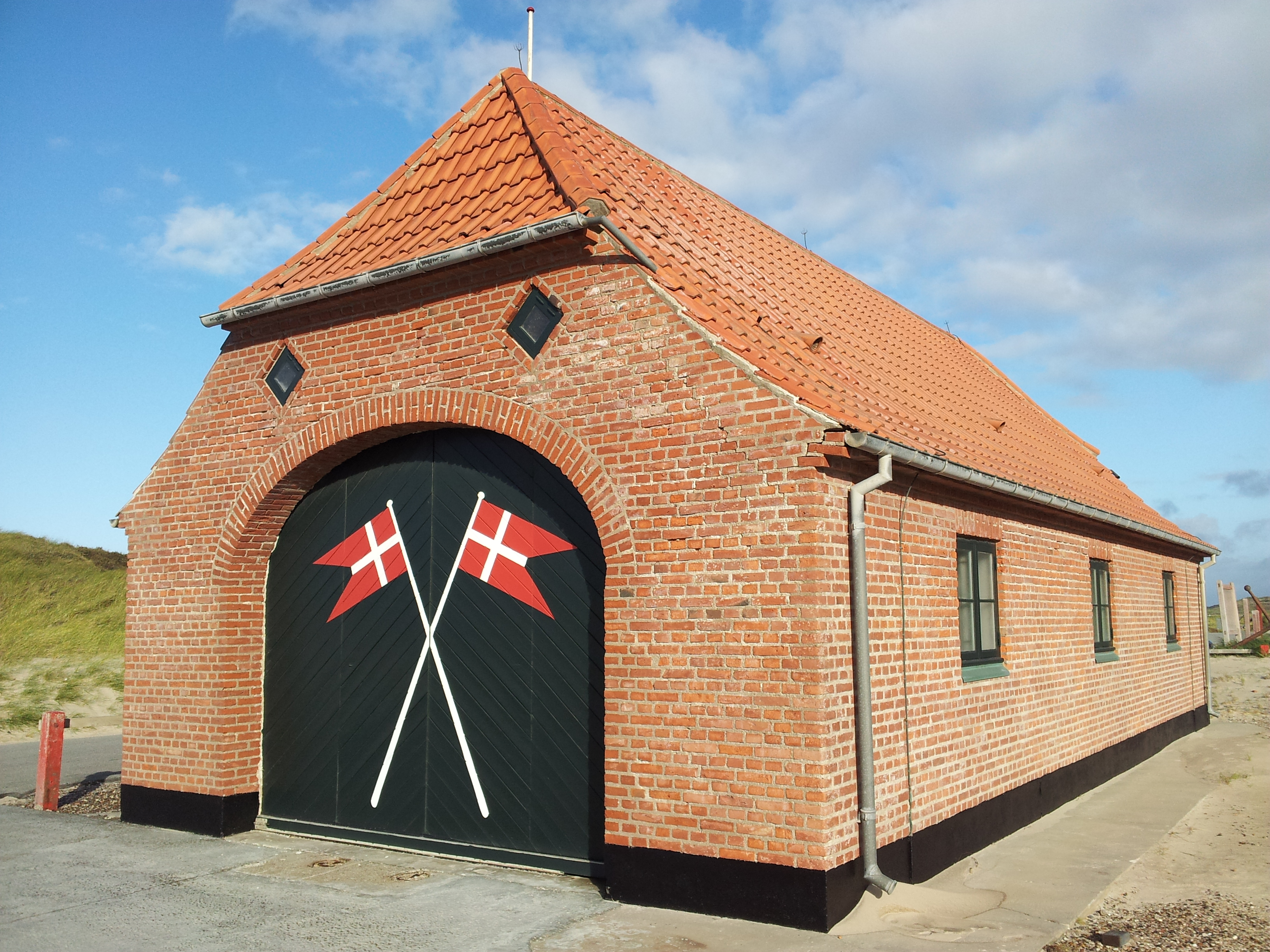
Lifeboat station

Stenbjerg Landingsplads

Stenbjerg is a fishing village on the former island of Thy in the northwest of Jutland, Denmark. It is noted for its small white fishermen's huts next to the sandy beach.

== History ==
The history of Stenbjerg is rather vague but probably goes back to the late 17th century when sand was swept in over the fields making it impossible to till the land. As a result, the peasants began to earn their living from fishing. The village is remembered for the visit by the painters P.S. Krøyer and his wife Marie who spent their two-month honeymoon at Stenbjerg Inn in 1899.

== Description ==
The fishermen's sheds in Stenberg Landingsplads were built around 1900 for storing their nets and equipment when they began fishing with motor boats. After commercial fishing was discontinued in 1972, the buildings fell into disrepair. They were restored in 2000 and again in 2012 and are now used by recreational fishermen. The lifeboat station was built in 1931, replacing the original station built in the centre of Stenbjerg in 1894. It houses a small exhibition which includes the Thyborøn lifeboat from 1892.

In July each year, Stenbjerg Day (Stenbjergdagen) combines festivities including live music with an opportunity to sample the local fish.
