= Summer Evening at Skagen. The Artist's Wife and Dog by the Shore =

1892 painting by Peder Severin Krøyer

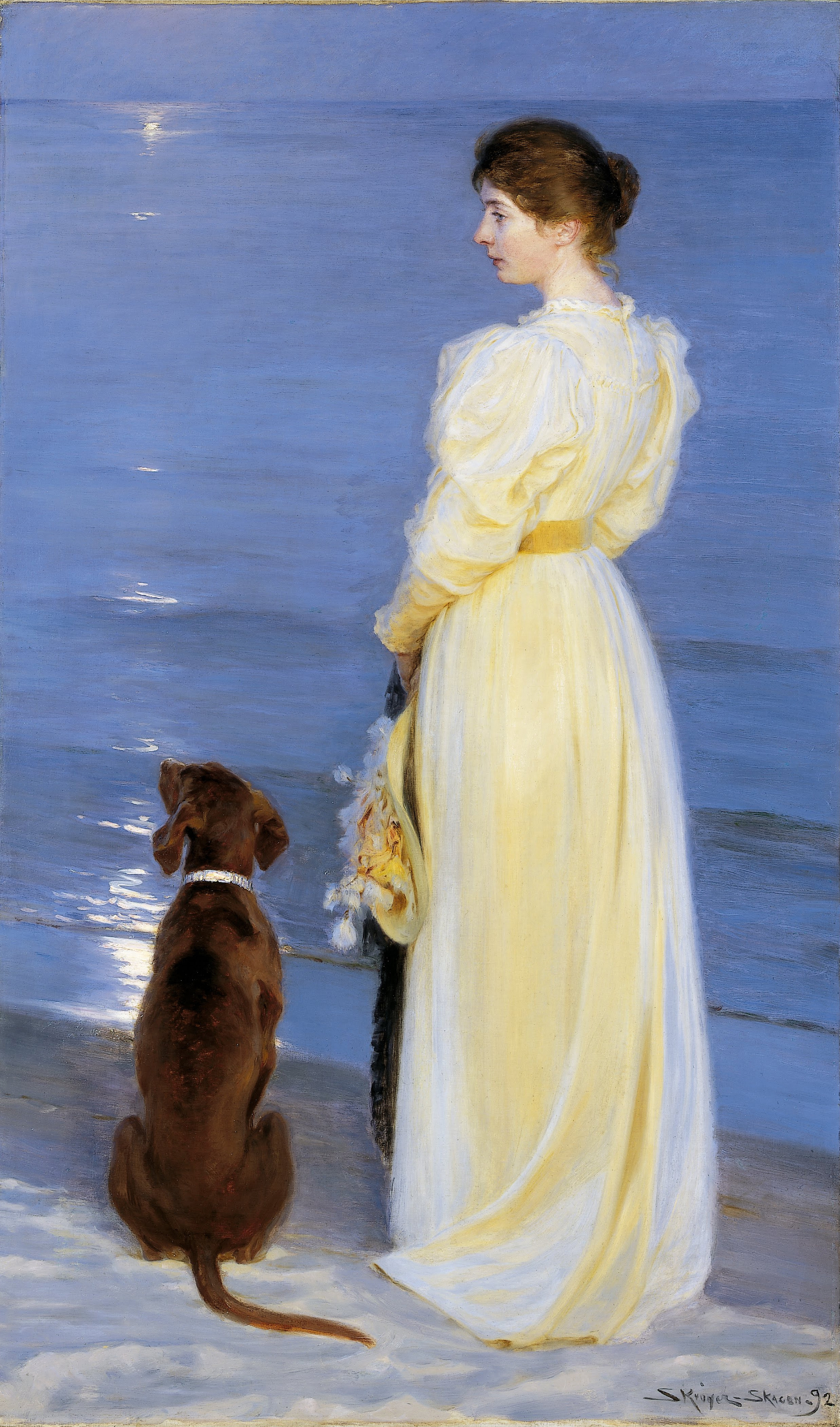
- Artist: Peder Severin Krøyer
- Year: 1892
- Medium: oil on canvas
- Dimensions: 206 cm × 123 cm (81 in × 48 in)
- Location: Skagens Museum, Skagen

Summer Evening at Skagen. The Artist's Wife and Dog by the Shore (Danish: Sommeraften ved Skagen. Kunstnerens hustru med hund ved strandkanten) is an 1892 painting by P.S. Krøyer, one of the best known of the artistic community known as the Skagen Painters. The work shows Marie Krøyer, the artist's wife, standing on the beach at Skagen with their dog Rap at her side and the moonlight reflected in the sea.

== Background ==
The Skagen Painters were a close-knit group of mainly Danish artists who gathered each summer from the late 1870s in the fishing village of Skagen in the far north of Jutland, painting the local fishermen and their own family life, gatherings and celebrations. Peder Severin Krøyer (1851–1909), who was born in Stavanger, Norway, but brought up in Copenhagen, first arrived in Skagen in 1882 and returned almost every summer, finally settling there permanently after marrying Marie Triepcke in 1889. He had already gained a reputation for his paintings of the fishermen in Hornbæk on the north coast of Zealand and had been influenced by the Impressionist movement during his travels to France. In Skagen, he became one of the central and most enthusiastic members of the artistic community creating masterpieces emphasizing the special effects of the local light, particularly in his beach scenes, and painting several memorable works recording the lively gatherings of the artists.

Marie Krøyer née Triepcke came from a well-to-do German family living in Copenhagen. From an early age she aspired to become an artist and after training privately she went to Paris to continue her studies. It was there, in early 1889, that she met Krøyer who immediately fell madly in love with her. Although he was 16 years her senior, the couple married that summer. In 1891, they settled in Skagen, giving Krøyer ample opportunity to paint portraits of Marie, both indoors and especially on the beach. The summers Krøyer spent together with his wife in the 1890s were clearly a source of inspiration for him, especially as Marie had a strong sense of beauty herself, often quoting Keats' "Beauty is truth, truth beauty". As a result of the periods of mental illness Krøyer experienced from 1900, the marriage fell apart. In 1912, she married the Swedish composer Hugo Alfvén who had also been taken by her beauty. It is believed Marie was reluctant to paint after meeting Krøyer whom she looked up to as a far more competent artist. A few of her works have nevertheless survived.

Two studies that Krøyer painted in preparation for the main piece

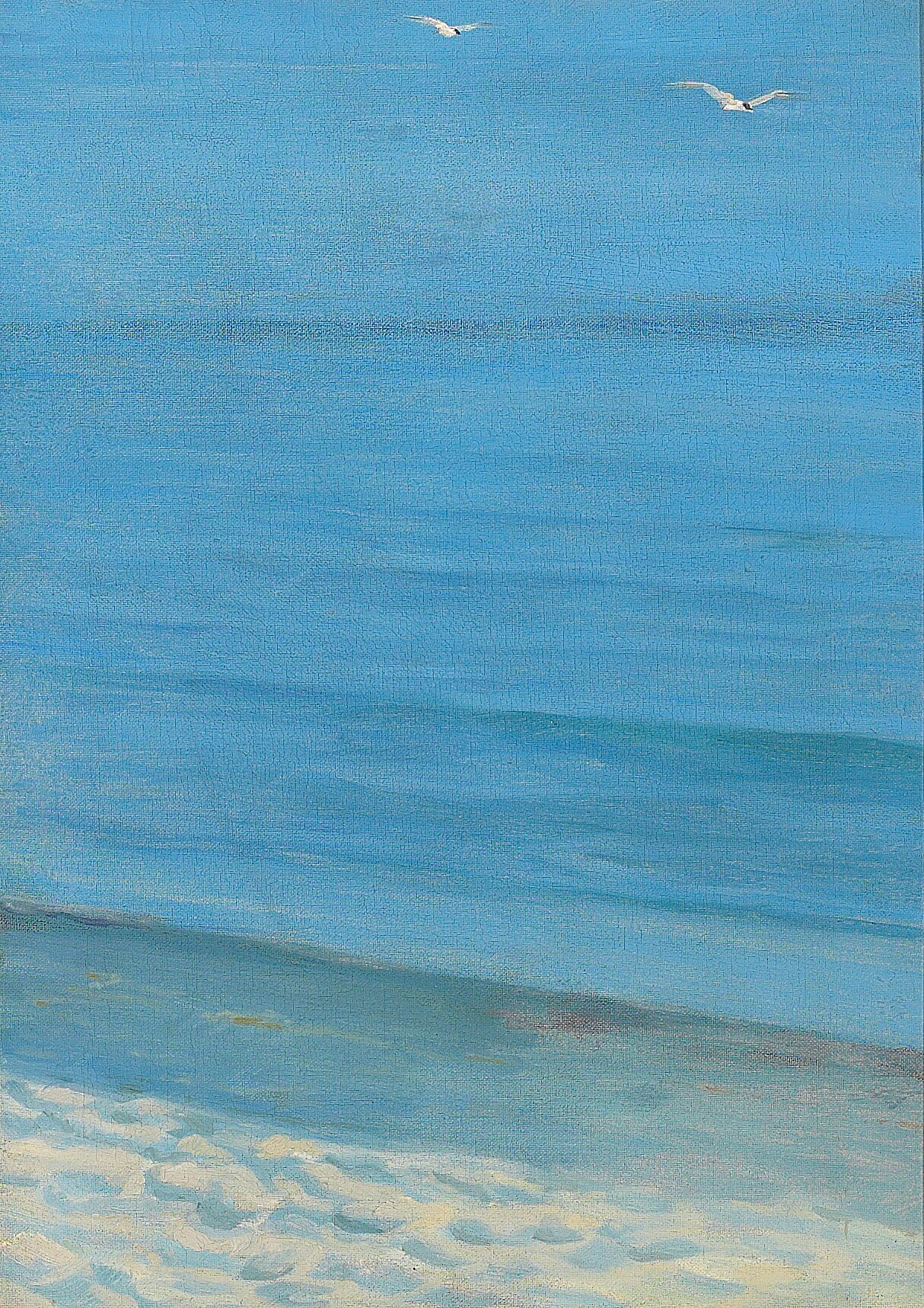
"Study of a beach with a couple of terns in the air, and a strip of sand with footprints. Slightly hazy."

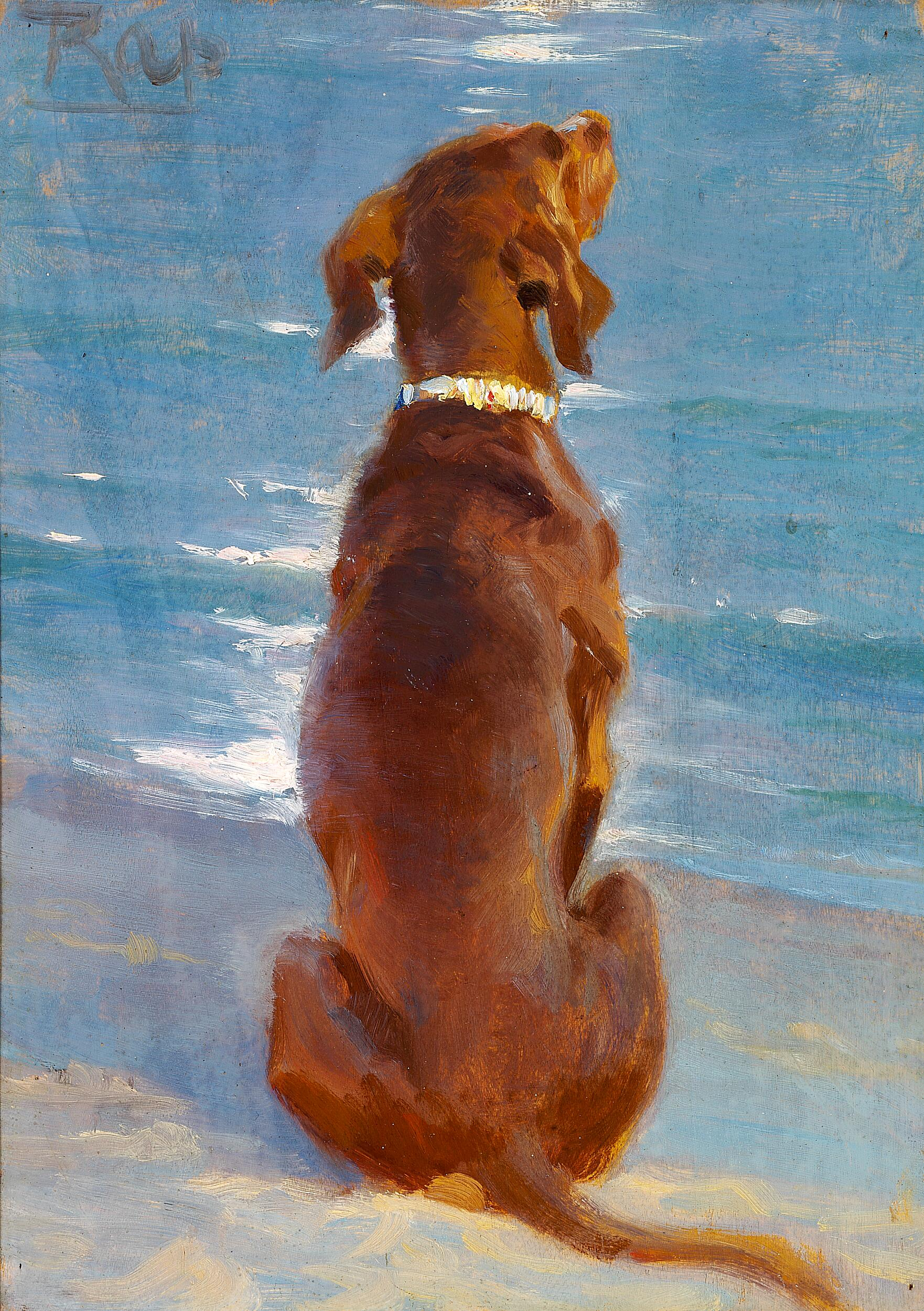
"A sitting brown dog. Rap."

== Painting ==
The work is oil on canvas and it measures 206 by 123 centimetres (81 in × 48 in). Marie Krøyer is shown in profile and her melancholy face and bright dress glow under the light of the setting sun. The painting is one of the works in which Krøyer tries to capture the light and mood on the Skagen shore during what he called "l'heure bleue" (the blue hour), the short period at dusk when the light casts a blue tint over the landscape. The Moon's reflection adds a slight feeling of depth to the otherwise flat background which consists mostly of the monolithic blue sea. Although Marie is depicted as being at a similar height to the viewer, the horizon rises above her head, so her radiance is emphasized by comparison with the muted, nearly monochrome background.

== Reception ==
The painting was exhibited in 1893 in Den Frie Udstilling (The Free Exhibition). Reviews were mixed; Carl Hartmann writing in the conservative Nationaltidende thought the painting beautiful and stated that it was "so fine that it ... throws an ennobling light on the whole collection", while Johannes Jørgensen in Politiken claimed that the viewer quickly tired of the picture as the figure of Marie was "incapable of awakening any mood", the colour was in places "distinctly unpleasant" and the dog, Rap, was "an ugly and unpleasant animal to behold". Critics at the Salon du Champ-de-Mars in 1894 were generally enthusiastic over Krøyer's use of colour and were struck and intrigued by the flatness of the composition. French critics who saw the picture at the Jeu de Paume in Paris in 1928 compared it to the Impressionist works of Paul-Albert Besnard, in particular his portrait of Madame Roger Jourdain, though at least one opined that the comparison showed the "victorious influence" of the French school.

== Provenance ==
After the exhibition at Den Frie Udstilling in 1893, it was exhibited at a Munich exhibition in the summer of the same year, and then sold to a German art lover directly from the exhibition. Krøyer had mixed feelings about the sale as he would have preferred to have kept the portrait for a Danish museum, but was pleased that his painting had drawn so much appreciation at the German exhibition that he had not only had enthusiastic reviews but was able to sell it for 1000 kroner more than he would have been able to achieve in Denmark. Although Krøyer no longer owned the painting he was still allowed to exhibit it at the Salon du Champ-de-Mars in 1894. In 1900, he received a letter from the original German purchaser, a banker called Steinbart, informing him that he would like to offer it for sale; Krøyer talked to Heinrich Hirschsprung who arranged for J.C. Jacobsen to acquire it for the Ny Carlsberg Glyptotek in early 1902. In 1937 it was lodged at Skagens Museum.

== See also ==
- List of works by Peder Severin Krøyer

== Sources ==
- Harmony in Blue: P.S. Krøyer's Poetic Paintings from the 1890s. Skagens Museum. 2001. ISBN 87-91048-03-6.
- Svanholm, Lise (2004). Northern Light: The Skagen Painters. Gyldendal A/S. ISBN 978-87-02-02817-1.
