= Degn Brøndum =

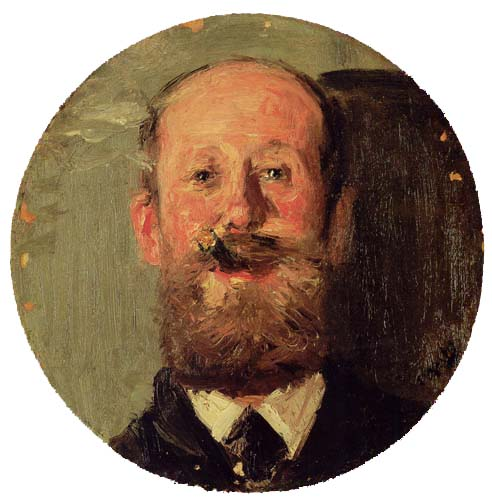
Degn Brøndom, painted by P.S. Krøyer (1883)

Christen Degn Brøndum (21 March 1856 – 18 April 1932) was the proprietor of Brøndums Hotel in Skagen, Denmark, which was closely associated with the Skagen Painters.

== Biography ==
Born in Skagen, Brøndum was the son of Erik Andersen Brøndum and Ane Hedvig Møller and the brother of Anna Ancher. Erik Andersen Brøndum, Anna's and Degn's father ran the Brøndums Hotel before Degn Brøndum took over the hotel around 1880. Anna Ancher became one of the Skagen painters. Degn Brøndum was one of the founders of Skagens Museum in 1908.

An avid art lover, Brøndum provided accommodation for many of the artists who came to spend the summer months in Skagen. If the artists were short of money, they were able to cover the cost of their accommodation at Brøndum's hotel by donating paintings to Degn Brøndum. These paintings were hung in the dining-room. In addition to Michael Ancher, who married his sister Anna, the guests included P.S. Krøyer, Christian Krogh, Carl Locher, Holger Drachmann, Agnes and Harald Slott-Møller, Georg Brandes, Thorvald Bindesbøll and Hugo Alfvén. When the dining-room became too small to accommodate the increasing number of guests, Brøndum called upon Bindesbøll to design a larger room where the paintings could be hung on the paneling.

Degn Brøndum left the dining-room's paintings to Skagens Museum where it was transferred in 1946.

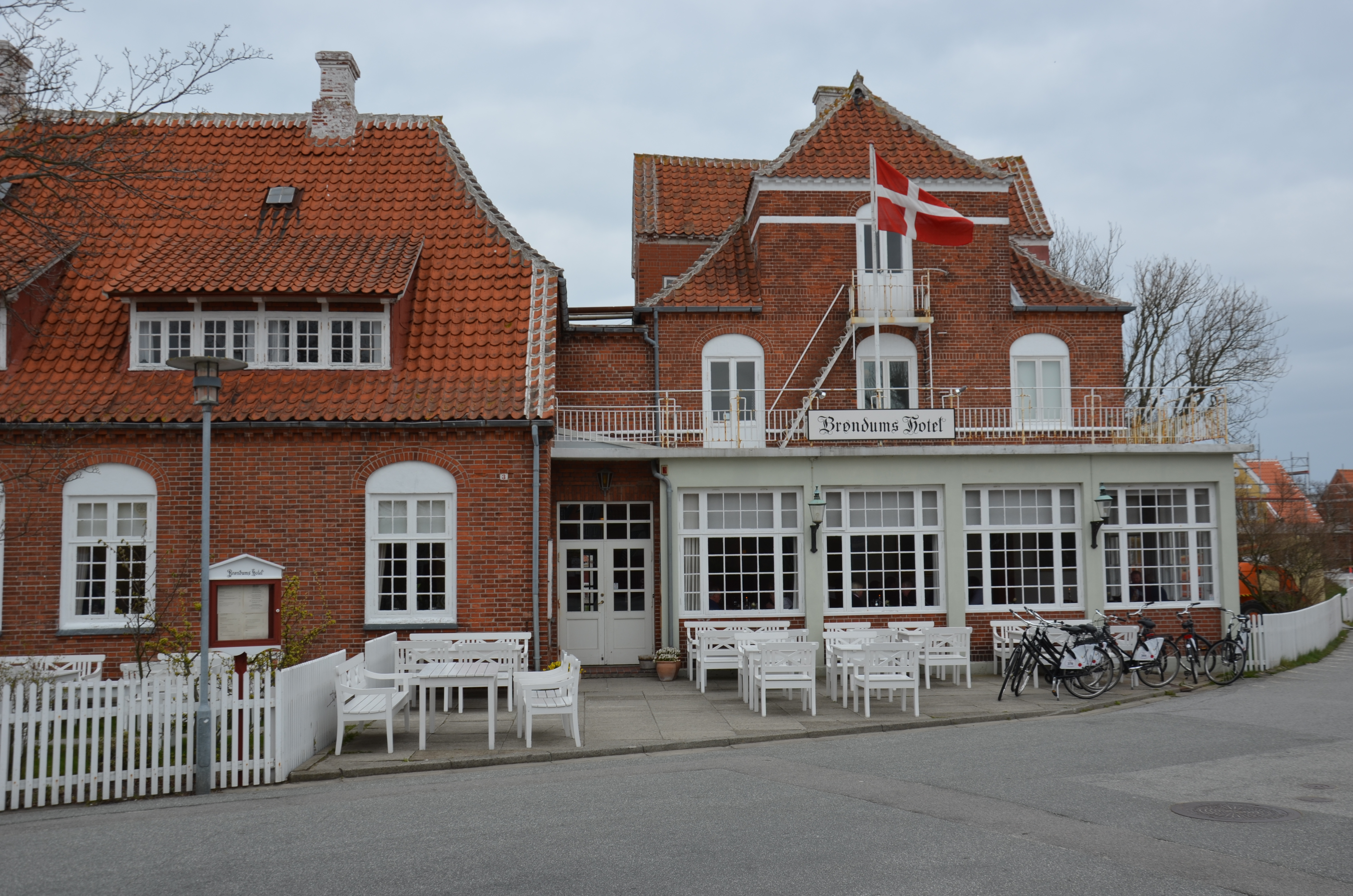
Hotel Brøndum

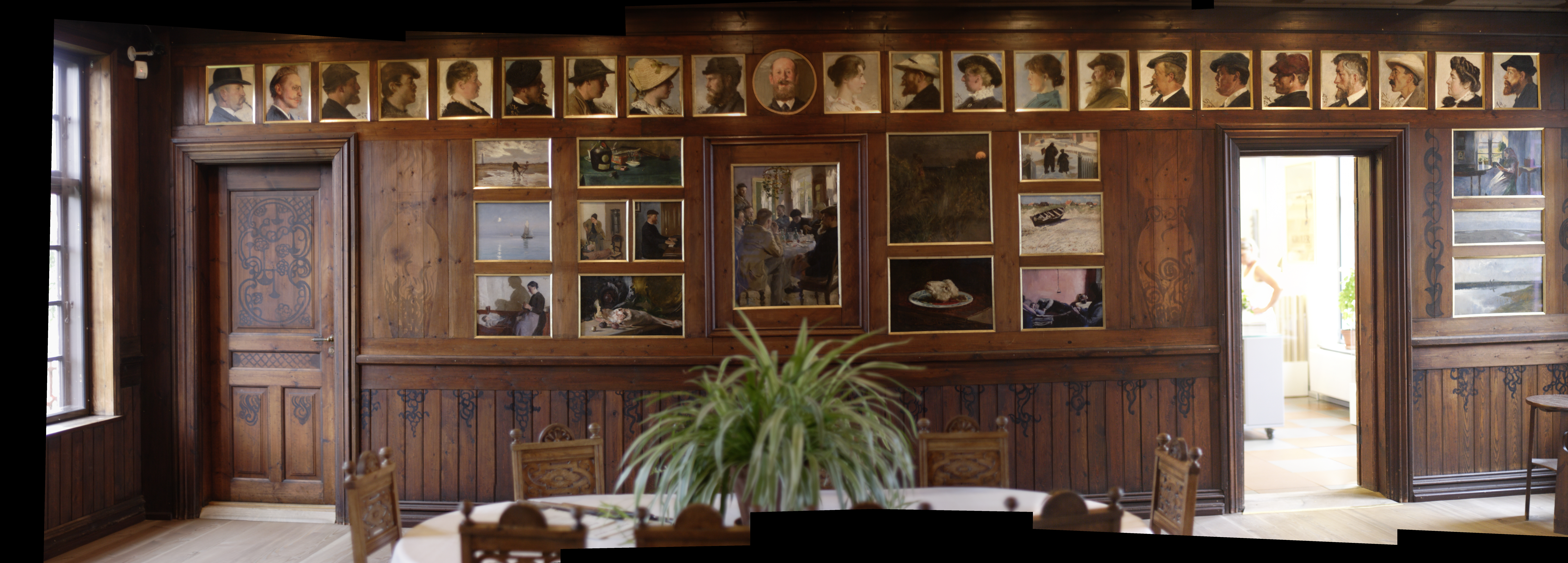
The dining room

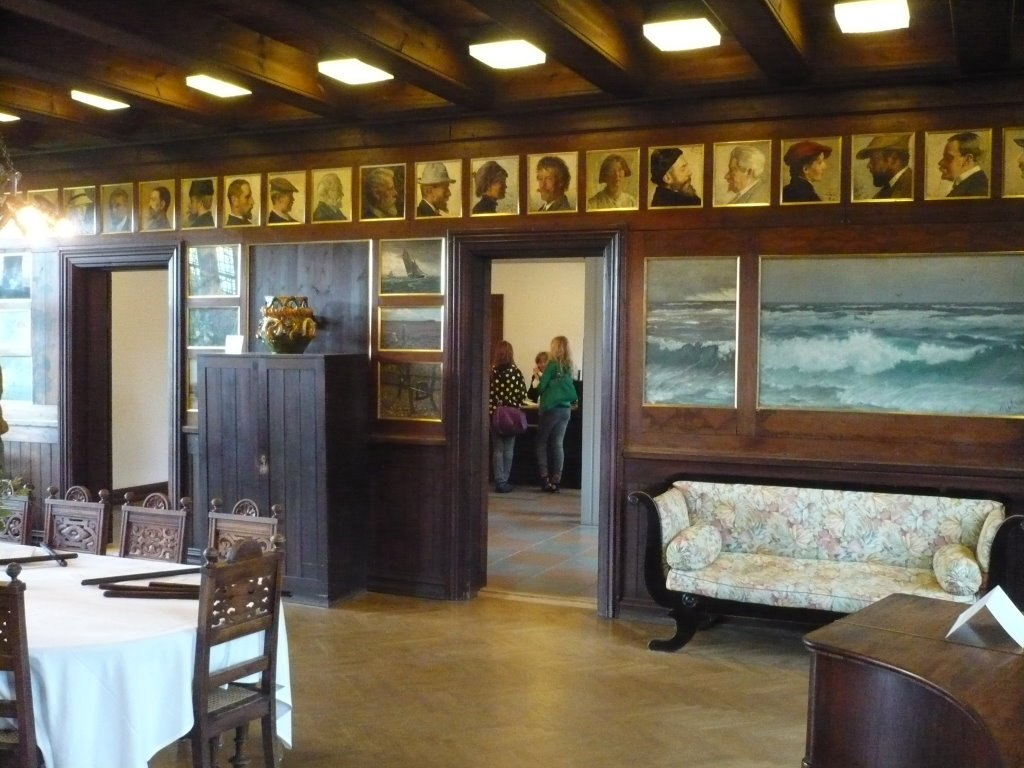
The dining-room with paintings

The bust of Christen Degn Brøndum in Skagen
