= Brøndums Hotel =

Hotel in Skagen, Denmark

Coordinates: 57°43′29″N 10°35′54″E

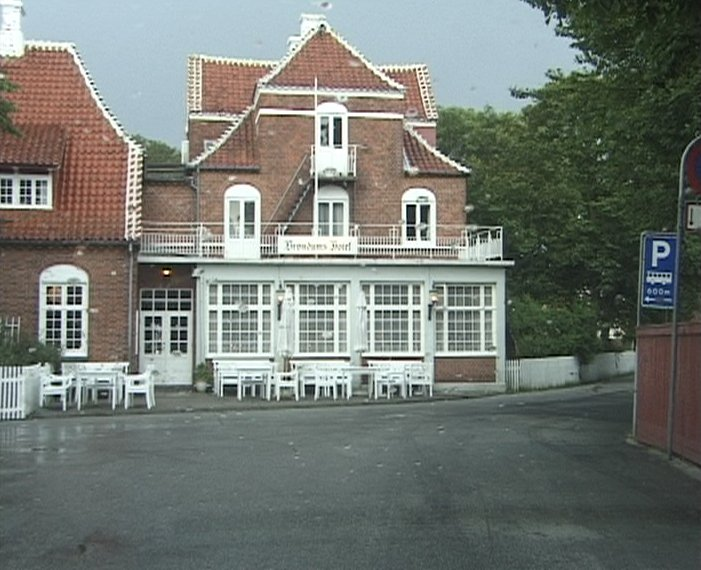
- Brøndums Hotel, Skagen

Brøndums Hotel, in the little harbor town of Skagen in the north of Denmark, is remembered for its close associations with the late 19th-century artists colony known as the Skagen Painters. It still operates as a hotel today.

== History ==
The hotel originated in a farmhouse which Ane Kirstine Houmann (1785–1858) had inherited from her stepfather Chresten Jensen Degn (1760–1839). After the death of her husband Anders Eriksen Brøndum (1781–1835), her son Erik Andersen Brøndum (1820–1890) helped her to run the grocery shop and guest house which she established in the old farmhouse. Erik and his wife Anne Hedvig Sørensdatter Møller (1826–1916) later ran the business together until it was taken over by their son Christen Degn Brøndum (1856–1932) who converted it into guest rooms and in 1891 gave it the name of Brondums Hotel. Their daughter, the painter Anna Ancher (1859–1935) was born in the hotel.

The architect Ulrik Plesner was called upon to expand the hotel in 1892. It was further expanded in 1909 and 1916, latterly with an extension known as Admiralgården. The interior of the dining-room was designed by Thorvald Bindesbøll in 1906. The hotel was run by Degn Brøndum until his death in 1932 when he left it to Skagens Museum. The hotel was damaged by fire in 1954 and 1959. Repairs together with the cost of modernization after the Second World War brought the concern into debt and led to its sale in 1966.

The hotel was a place of staying for Hans Christian Andersen and Karen Blixen.

== The painters' venue ==
The Skagen Painters had close associations with Brøndums Hotel. Michael Ancher arrived in Skagen in 1874 where he struck up a close relationship with the Brøndoms, marrying their daughter Anna in 1880. He encouraged his friends Karl Madsen and Viggo Johansen to join him in 1875. More artists followed, many staying in the Brøndums' guest house. Key members of the group included the author Georg Brandes and the painter P.S. Krøyer, their unofficial leader The Brøndums' dining-room became the centre of the artists' social life and was filled with the paintings they donated to cover the cost of board and lodging.

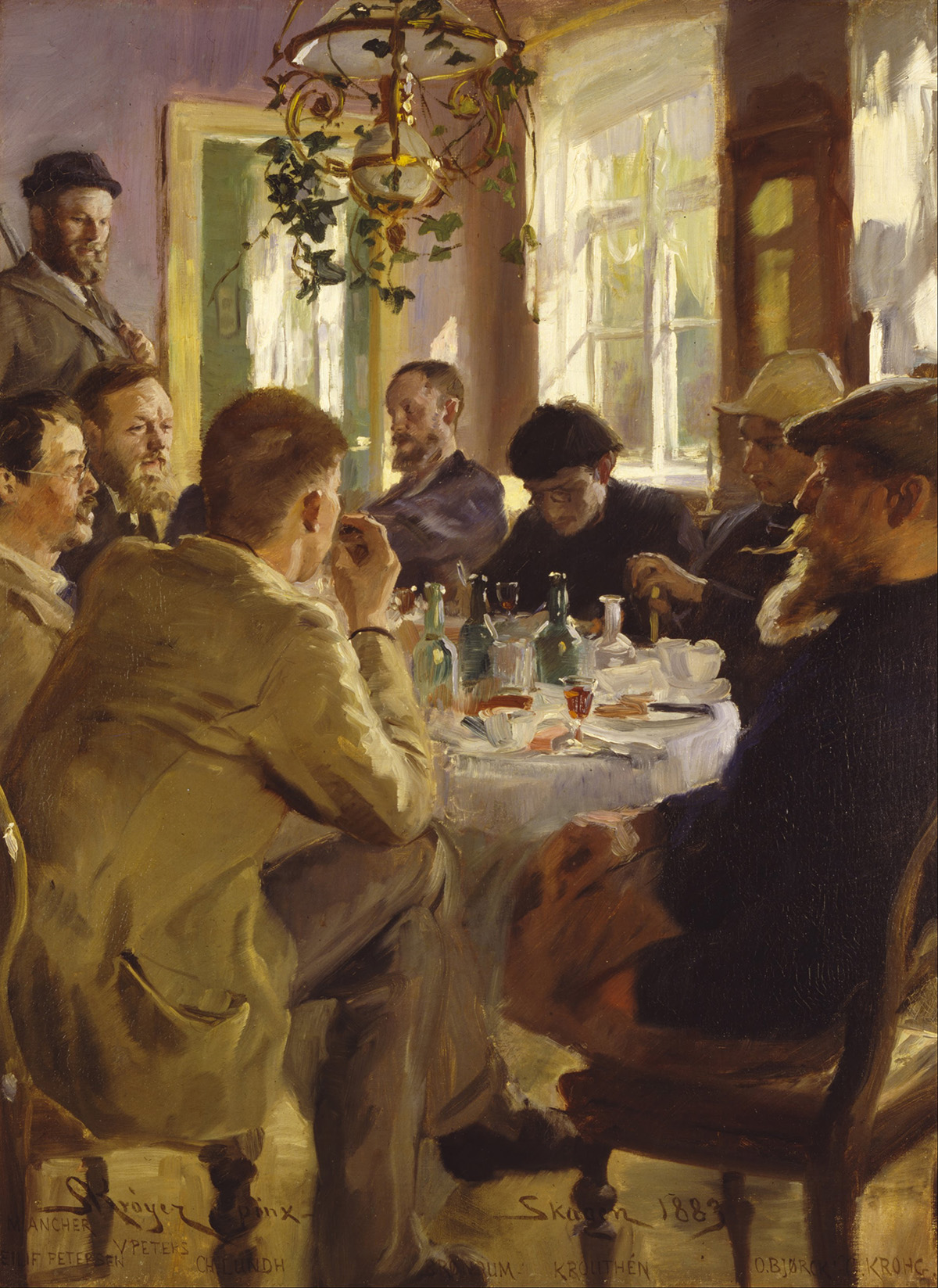
P.S. Krøyer: Ved Frokosten (1883), the painters lunching in the hotel

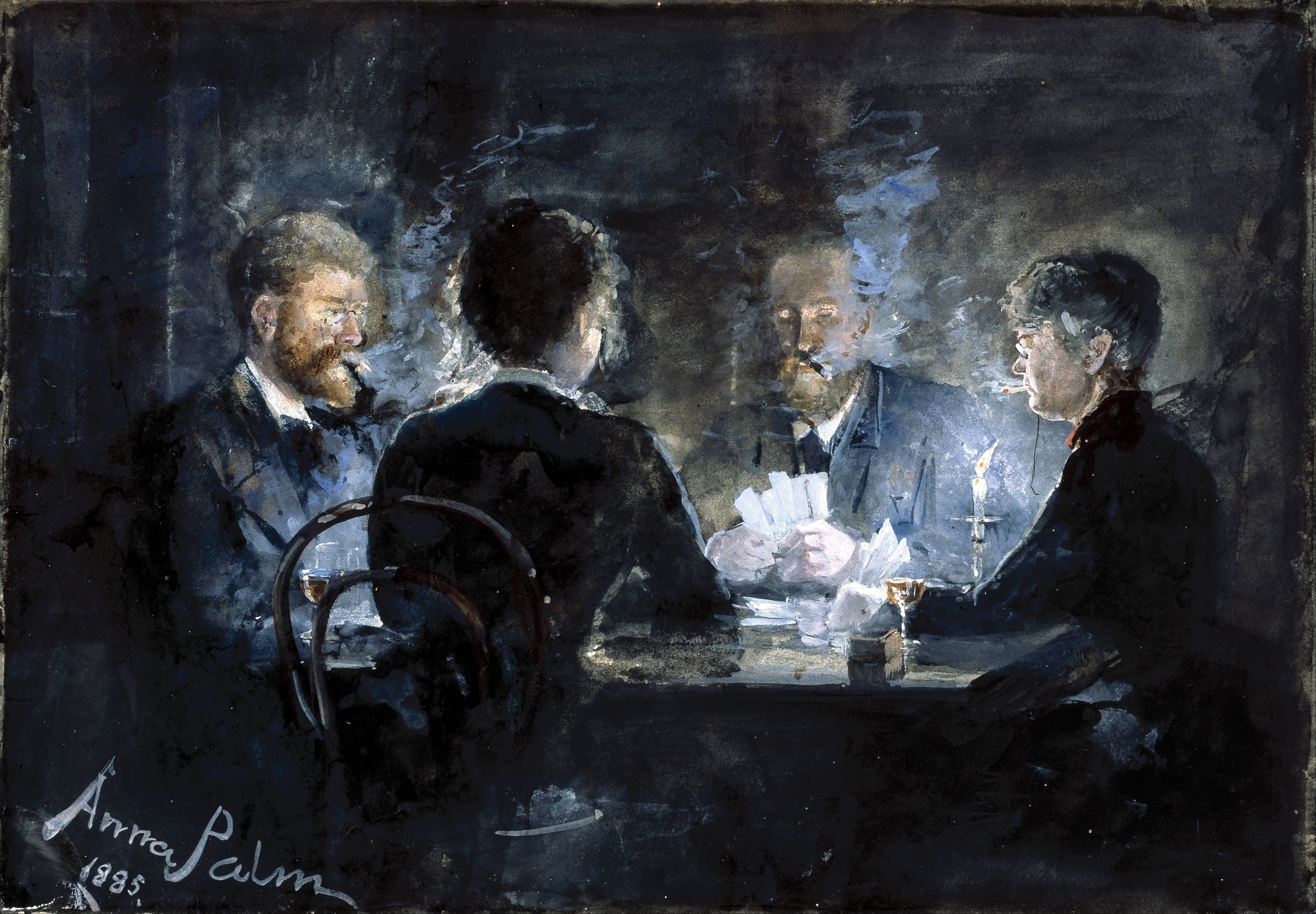
A Game of L'hombre in Brøndum's Hotel by Anna Palm de Rosa

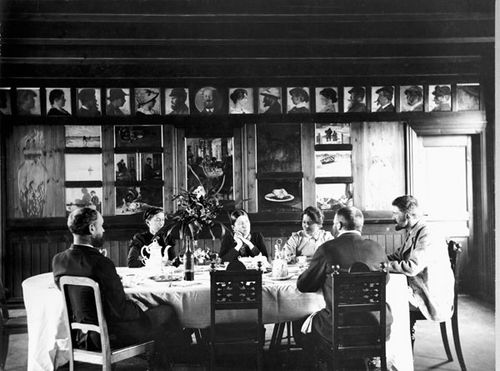
The hotel dining-room with portraits of the Skagen Painters

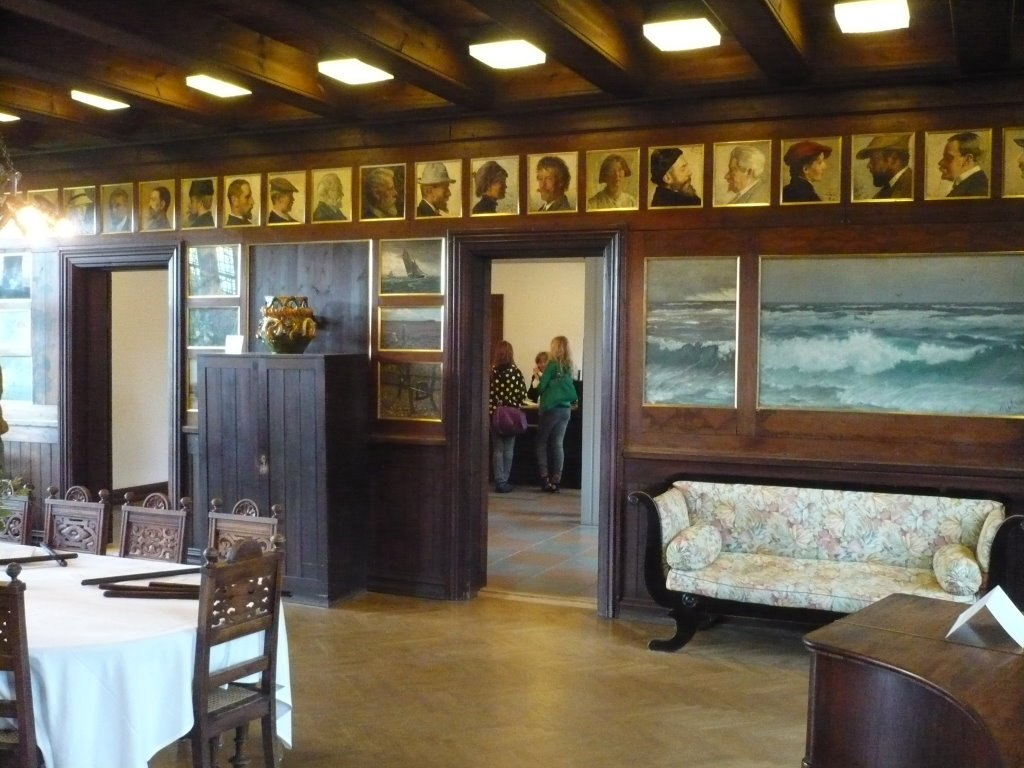
The dining-room today, now in Skagens Museum

== Literature ==
- Bøgh Jensen, Mette (2011). Brøndums spisesal: Til tak for glade dage (in Danish). Skagens Museum. ISBN 978-87-91048-26-5.
- Jacobsen, Claus (2003): Brøndums Hotel: stedet og maden, Aschehougs Forlag. ISBN 87-11-16315-1. (in Danish)
- Voss, Knud (1989): Hos Brøndums i Skagen 1780-1930, Forlaget Gyldendal. ISBN 87-00-40812-3. (in Danish)
