= Summer Evening at Skagen Beach – The Artist and his Wife =

1889 painting by Peder Severin Krøyer

- Artist: Peder Severin Krøyer
- Year: 1899
- Medium: oil on canvas
- Dimensions: 135 cm × 187 cm (53 in × 74 in)
- Location: Hirschsprung Collection, Copenhagen, Denmark

Summer Evening at Skagen Beach – The Artist and his Wife (Danish: Sommeraften ved Skagens strand. Kunstneren og hans hustru) is an 1899 painting by Peder Severin Krøyer. One of the best known paintings of the Skagen Painters, it depicts Krøyer with his wife Marie and his dog Rap strolling on the beach in the moonlight.

== Background ==
The Skagen Painters were a close-knit group of mainly Danish artists who gathered each summer from the late 1870s in the fishing village of Skagen in the far north of Jutland, painting the local fishermen and their own gatherings. P. S. Krøyer arrived there in 1882, quickly becoming the most prominent member of the group.

In 1895, in a letter to his friend Oscar Björck, Krøyer wrote "I am also thinking of painting a large portrait of my wife and me together — but for that I shall definitely need good weather, so it won't be this year." In fact it was four years later, in the summer of 1899, that he finally created his large painting. Maybe it was in recognition of 10 years of marriage with Marie Triepcke as illustrated in other works of family life at the time as well as in a number of the photographs and sketches he used as a basis for the work.

== See also ==
- List of works by Peder Severin Krøyer
