= Skagens Museum =

Art museum in Skagen, Denmark

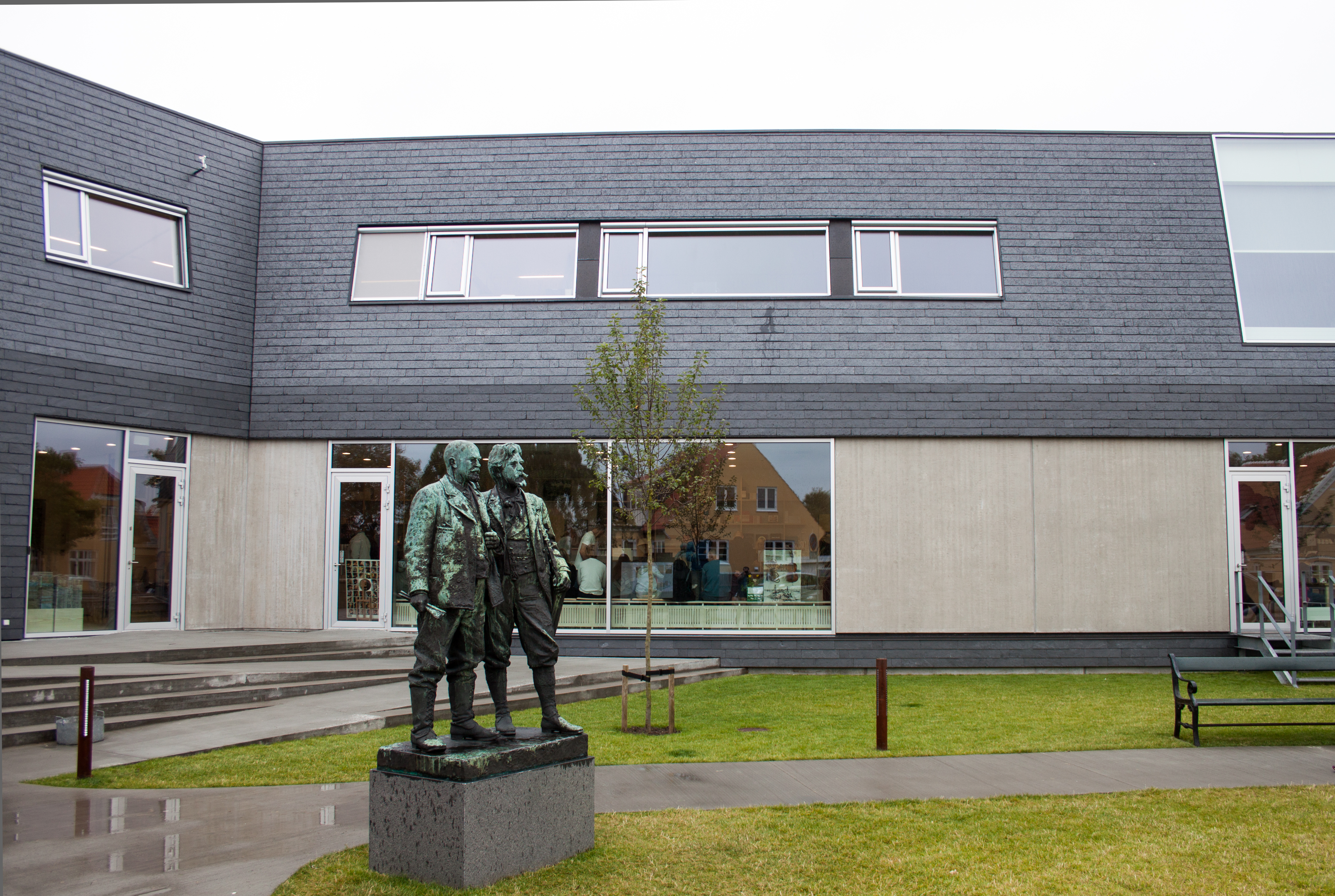
- Statue of Michael Ancher and PS Krøyer by Laurits Tuxen
- Interactive fullscreen map
- Established: 1908
- Location: Skagen, Denmark
- Coordinates: 57°43′29″N 10°35′50″E
- Type: Art museum
- Visitors: 89.004 (2014)
- Director: Lisette Vind Ebbesen
- Architects: Ulrik Plesner (1928), Friis & Moltke (2014–2016)
- Website: skagensmuseum.dk

Skagens Museum is an art museum in Skagen, Denmark, that exhibits an extensive collection of works by members of the colony of Skagen Painters who lived and worked in the area in the late 19th and early 20th centuries. Important artists include Marie and P. S. Krøyer, Anna and Michael Ancher, Laurits Tuxen, Viggo Johansen, and Holger Drachmann. The museum also hosts special exhibitions. Its facilities include a café in the Garden House, an old building which for a while served as home residence and studio of Anna and Michael Ancher.

== History ==
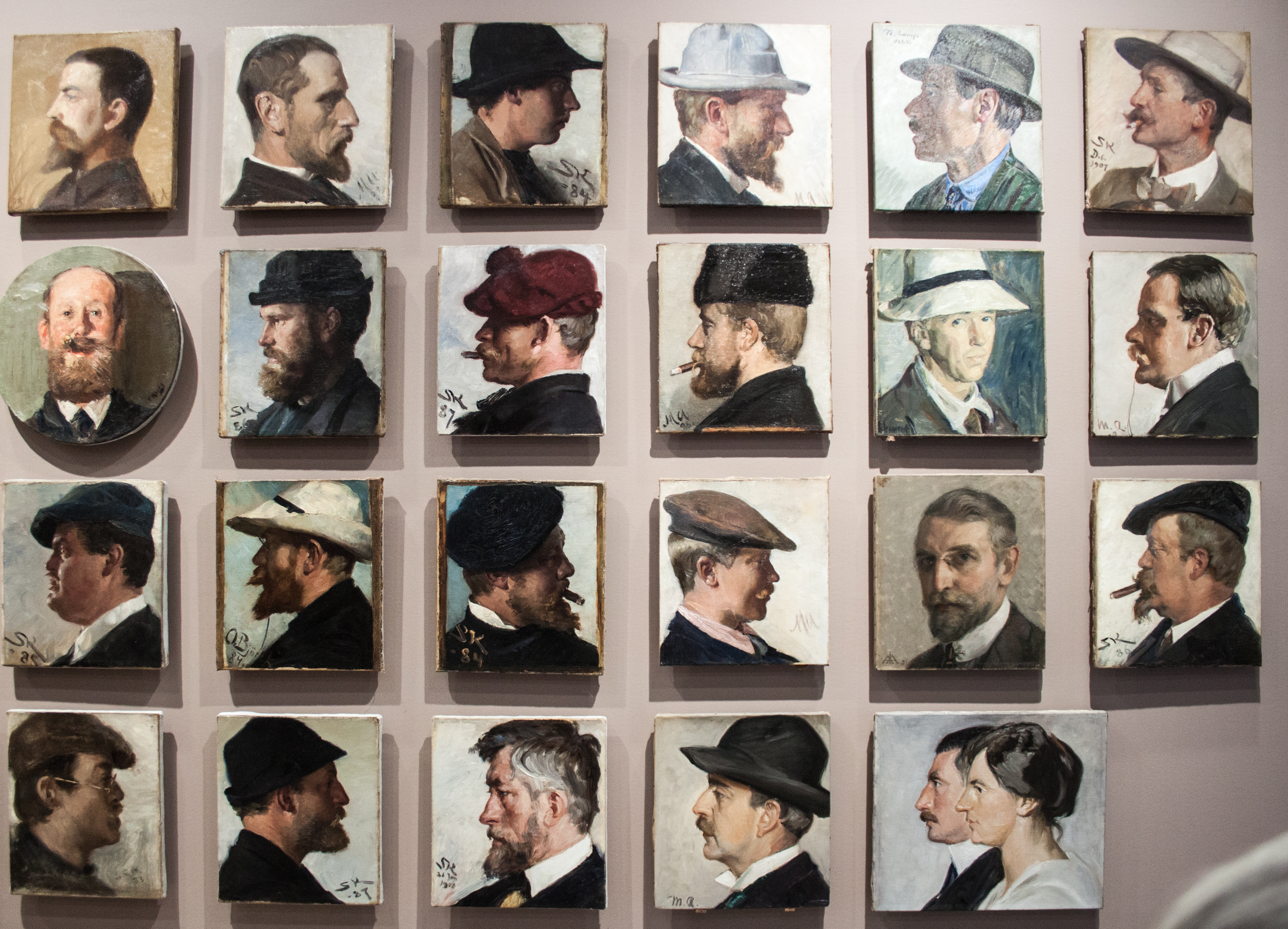
Portrait gallery by Skagen painters

Skagens Museum was founded on 20 October 1908 in the dining room at Brøndums Hotel. Among the founders were artists Michael Ancher, P.S. Krøyer and Laurits Tuxen, who were elected to form the first board of governors together with Victor Christian Klæbel, the local pharmacist, and Degn Brøndum, proprietor of Brøndums Hotel and Anna Ancher's brother. The idea was to collect works by the Skagen Painters and to raise funds for the construction of a building for their exhibition. It was also decided that the Brøndums Hotel's dining room should, in due time, be transferred to the new museum once it had been built. It had served as an important venue for the members of the artist colony ever since its formation in the 1870s.

The first exhibitions were arranged in the local technical school. After P.S. Krøyer's death in 1909, his house in Skagen Plantation was used as a temporary venue for the museum. In 1919, Degn Brøndum donated the old garden of his hotel for the construction of a purpose-built museum. The architect Ulrik Plesner was charged with its design. He was an active member of the artistic community in Skagen and had already designed a number of buildings in the area. The building was financed by a combination of private donors and foundations with Degn Brøndum, Laurits Tuxen and the Ny Carlsberg Foundation as the largest contributors. Construction started in 1926 and the new museum was officially opened on 22 September 1928.

In 1982, the exhibition rooms were extended with an annex designed by the Royal Surveyor, architect Jacob Blegvad. Blegvad also planned the later extension to the museum that was inaugurated in 1989.

In the period 1997–2015, the museum's administration was housed in the old Technical School, but since then has had offices on the first floor of the new museum extension.

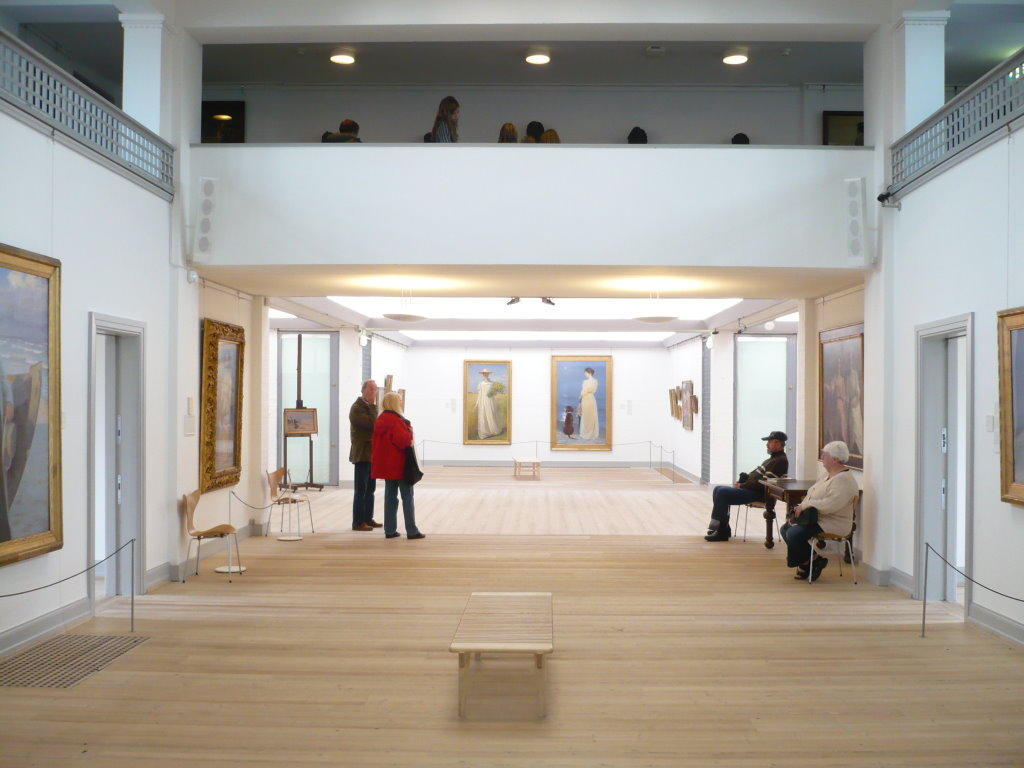
One of the galleries

== Collections and special exhibitions ==
Today Skagens Museum has more than 1,800 works of art at its disposal. All important members of the artist colony are represented in the collections with central works, including Maria and P. S. Krøyer, Anna and Michael Ancher, Laurits Tuxen, Viggo Johansen and Holger Drachmann.

The museum also hosts special exhibitions.

== Brøndum's dining room ==
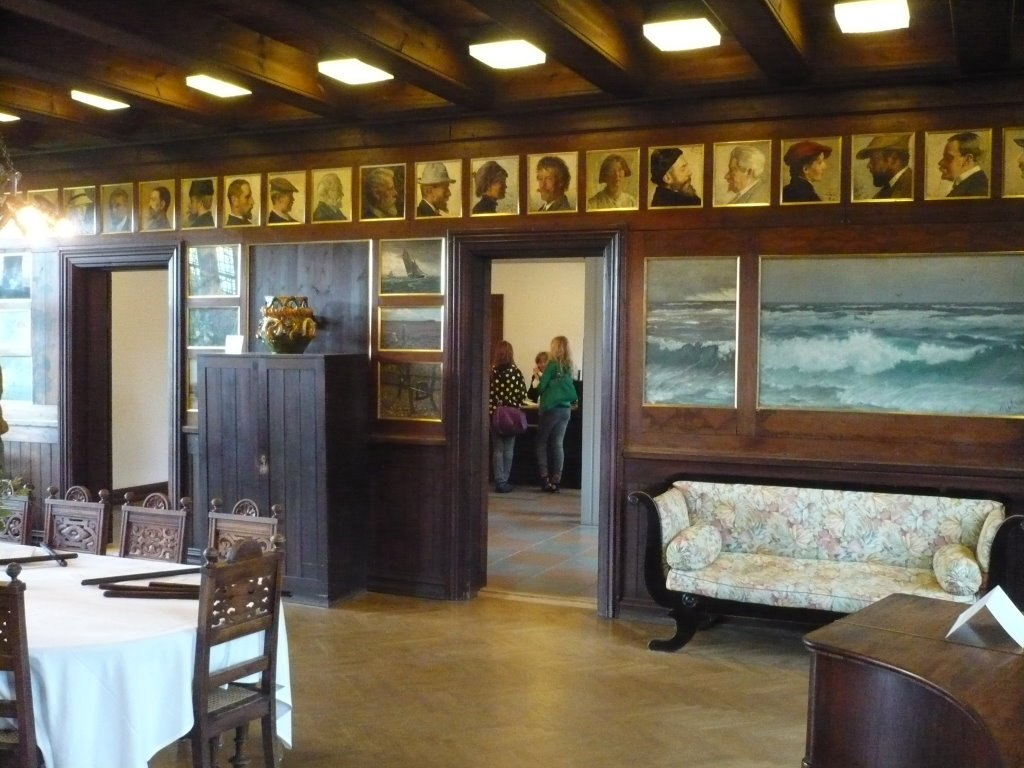
Brøndum's dining room today

The dining room of Brøndums Hotel as it appears today was designed by Ulrik Plesner and Thorvald Bindesbøll in connection with the first major expansion of the hotel in 1892. Instigated by P. S. Krøyer, it was decided to incorporate Degn Brøndum's art collection in its decoration. Over the years it had become a custom that visiting artists donated portraits of each other to the hotel owner and these were placed in a frieze just under the ceiling. The dining room also features the furniture which Maria Krøyer designed for it in 1898.

Today the dining room is also used for wedding ceremonies.

== Garden and Garden House ==
The museum garden features some of the museum's sculptures.

The Garden House is one of the oldest buildings in Skagen and received its name when it was incorporated into what was then the hotel garden. In 1853 it was used as a cholera lazaretto.

In 1880, after their wedding, Michael and Anna Ancher took up residency in the building. They used the eastern end as a studio with natural light from a large new window still present in the gable. Their daughter Helga Ancher was born in the house in 1883. The following year the family moved to a new house on Markvej, now known as the Michael and Anna Ancher House, but Michael Ancher continued to use the Garden House as a studio. Later it was used as a summer residence for artists.

After the Brøndum family donated the garden house to Skagens Museum in 1919, they hosted various exhibitions and established memorial rooms dedicated to P. S. Krøer and Holger Drachman. From 1989 ti 1997, the house served as an administration building. Since 2009, it has been a café.

== Digital art project ==
Many of the museum's paintings have been digitized under the Google Art Project. As of August 2013, 105 are accessible online. The museum's director, Lisette Vind Ebbesen, believes it is important for the museum's paintings to be available online as it allows people from around the world to access the works even if they are unable to visit the museum itself. She is nevertheless convinced that visitors to the museum continue to appreciate the originals which provide a special kind of experience. In addition, they can access additional information about the works on iPod guides as they move through the museum, frequently spending longer as they study individual works.

Another technological development has involved the painting Hip, Hip, Hurra! which is not part of the museum's physical collection as it hangs in the Gothenburg Museum of Art. Thanks to funding from the European Regional Development Fund, it was possible to develop a three-dimensional digital version of the painting in the museum next to the site where it was originally painted.

== Anchers Hus and Drachmanns Hus ==
In 2014, Skagens Museum became Skagens Kunstmuseer (Art Museums of Skagen) by merging with the two local historic house museums; Anchers Hus, the art museum and former residence of the painters Michael and Anna Ancher and their daughter Helga Ancher, as well as Drachmanns Hus, a writer's home museum dedicated to the writer and marine painter Holger Drachmann. This has furthermore extended the museum's collection with several thousands original objects, personal belongings, furniture, works of art, photographs etc. from the two houses and their former residents and artists.

== Extensions ==
In 2014, the museum underwent substantial extensions to the west of the original building. Planned by architects Friis & Moltke, the work included a new building with an additional 2,000 m^{2} (22,000 sq ft) of floor space on the ground floor, first floor and in the basement. It currently provides space for special exhibitions and for the museum's shop on the ground floor as well as administrative offices on the first floor. The museum was thus extended from the original 509 m^{2} (5,480 sq ft) to 917 m^{2} (9,870 sq ft), allowing up to 50% of the museum's collection of 2,000 works to be displayed to visitors while offering better facilities for exhibiting sculptures and drawings. The project was completed on February 12, 2016. Skagens Museum is Denmark's fifth most popular art museum with up to 200,000 visitors a year. Frederikshavn Municipality has provided DKK 5 million for the project, supplemented by donations from a number of foundations.

== Publications ==
The museum has published several books, mostly in Danish and English, about the Skagen Painters, Danish artists' colonies and exhibitions held at the museum. They include:

- Bøgh Jensen, Mette (2011). Brøndums spisesal: Til tak for glade dage (in Danish). Skagens Museum. ISBN 978-87-91048-26-5.
- Bøgh Jensen, Mette (2009). I Am Anna: A Homage to Anna Ancher. Skagens Museum. ISBN 978-87-91048-18-0.
- Bøgh Jensen, Mette (2012). Marie Krøyer: der skal mod til at have talent (in Danish). Skagens Museum. ISBN 978-87-91048-30-2.
- Bøgh Jensen, Mette; Fabienke, Tine Nielsen (2014). Tuxen. Colour, Countryside and Crown. Skagens Museum. ISBN 978-87-91048-33-3.
- Fabritius, Elisabeth (2007). Danish Artists' Colonies: The Skagen Painters, the Funen Painters, the Bornholm Painters, the Odsherred Painters. Skagens Museum. ISBN 978-87-88686-39-5.
- Vind Ebbesen, Lisette (2009). Skagensmalerne - introduktion til skagensmalerne og Skagens Museum (in Danish). ISBN 978-87-910-48197.

== See also ==
- Klitgården
