= Skagen Painters =

Late 1870s–early 1900s group of Scandinavian artists

Coordinates: 57.7250°N 10.5983°E

P.S. Krøyer: Hip, Hip, Hurrah! (1888) depicting the group's festivities

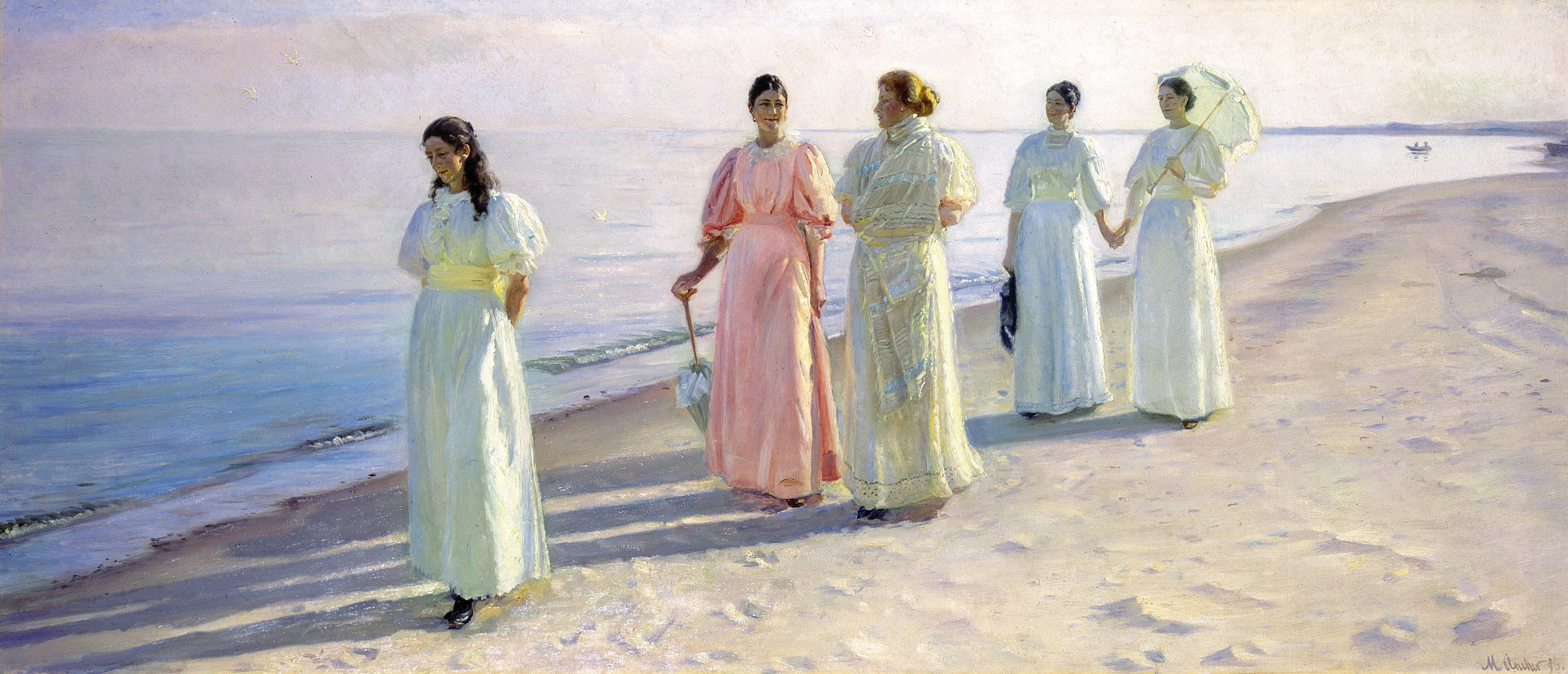
Michael Ancher: A Stroll on the Beach (1896)

The Skagen Painters (Danish: Skagensmalerne) were a group of Scandinavian artists who gathered in the village of Skagen, the northernmost part of Denmark, from the late 1870s until the turn of the century. Skagen was a summer destination whose scenic nature, local milieu and social community attracted northern artists to paint en plein air, emulating the French Impressionists—though members of the Skagen colony were also influenced by Realist movements such as the Barbizon school. They broke away from the rather rigid traditions of the Royal Danish Academy of Fine Arts and the Royal Swedish Academy of Arts, espousing the latest trends that they had learned in Paris. Among the group were Anna and Michael Ancher, Peder Severin Krøyer, Holger Drachmann, Karl Madsen, Laurits Tuxen, Marie Krøyer, Carl Locher, Viggo Johansen and Thorvald Niss from Denmark, Oscar Björck and Johan Krouthén from Sweden, and Christian Krohg and Eilif Peterssen from Norway. The group gathered together regularly at the Brøndums Hotel.

Skagen, in the very north of Jutland, was the largest fishing community in Denmark, with more than half of its population engaged. Among the locals, fishermen were by far the most common subject for the Skagen painters. Skagen's long beaches were exploited in the group's landscapes; P.S. Krøyer, one of the best known of the Skagen painters, was inspired by the light of the evening "blue hour", which made the water and sky seem to optically merge. This is captured in one of his most famous paintings, Summer Evening at Skagen Beach – The Artist and his Wife (1899). Although the painters had their own individual styles without any requirement to adhere to a common approach or manifest, one of their common interests was to paint scenes of their own social gatherings, playing cards, celebrating or simply eating together.

Michael Ancher drew attention to the attractions of the area when his Will He Round the Point? (1885) was purchased by King Christian IX. He married Anna Brøndum, the only member of the group from Skagen, who became a pioneering female artist at a time when women were not permitted to study at Denmark's Royal Academy. Today the Skagens Museum, founded in the dining room at Brøndum's Hotel in October 1908, hosts many of their works of art, some 1,800 pieces in total. Many of the paintings have been digitized under the Google Art Project and are accessible online. Related exhibitions continue to be held; in 2008, the Arken Museum of Modern Art in Copenhagen presented "The Skagen Painters—In a New Light", and in 2013, the National Museum of Women in the Arts in Washington, D.C. presented "A World Apart: Anna Ancher and the Skagen Art Colony".

== History ==
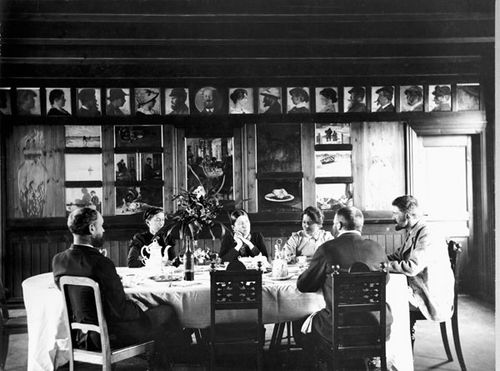
Dining room in Brøndums Hotel (c. 1891) showing some of the group and the panel of their portraits

The first notable artist to paint in Skagen was Martinus Rørbye (1803–1848), one of the central figures of the Golden Age of Danish Painting. His first visit was in 1833 but he returned towards the end of his life in 1847 and 1848. He is remembered in particular for his Men of Skagen on a Summer Evening in Fair Weather painted in 1848. Another marine painter, Vilhelm Melbye (1824–1882), visited Skagen in 1848, painting his View over Skagen. According to Karl Madsen, the painter Peter Raadsig (1806–1882) also visited the town on several occasions between 1862 and 1870, painting the dunes and the fishermen. Christian Blache (1838–1920), another marine painter, first visited Skagen in 1869 when he painted his Grey Lighthouse. It was as a result of his influence that the poet and dramatist Holger Drachmann first visited the town in 1871.

In the 1860s and 1870s, despite evolving trends in Europe, especially in Paris, embracing Realism and Impressionism, the Royal Danish Academy of Fine Arts and the Royal Swedish Academy of Arts refused to change their approach, insisting their students should continue to paint in the preferred styles of Historicism and Neoclassicism. Among those who were increasingly frustrated by this approach were Michael Ancher, Karl Madsen and Viggo Johansen who in the early 1870s were studying at the Royal Danish Academy in Copenhagen. Madsen, who had already visited Skagen in 1871 while staying with his uncle in nearby Frederikshavn, invited Ancher to join him there in 1874, to paint the local fishermen. Ancher became a friend of the Brøndum family, who had a shop with a bar which was soon extended to become Brøndums Gastgiveri, a guest house. He was invited to their 15-year-old daughter Anna's confirmation and showed an immediate interest in her. The following year, he returned to Skagen with both Madsen and Viggo Johansen, who had been strongly influenced by French Impressionism. In particular, Johansen began to paint open-air scenes combining Impressionism with Realism.

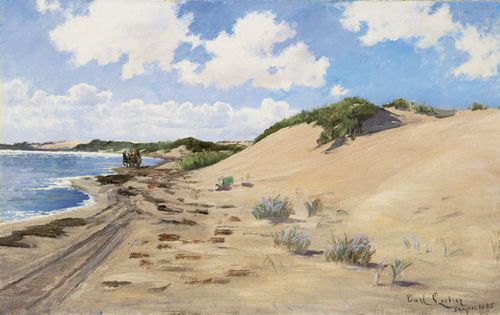
Carl Locher: Mail Coach on Skagen Beach (c. 1890)

In 1876 and especially in 1877, several other artists spent the summer in Skagen, using the Brøndums' house for accommodation and their frequent gatherings. Michael Ancher made Skagen his new home. He became engaged to Anna Brøndum in 1878 and married her in 1880. Their home then became a focal point for the artists, especially after King Christian IX bought Ancher's painting Will He Round the Point?. Anna Ancher first took a serious interest in painting after the artists began to stay in her family's inn, leaving their paintings to dry in their rooms when they left for the day. She studied them carefully and in 1875 attended Vilhelm Kyhn's art school in Copenhagen. She was later influenced by Christian Krohg, who taught her the art of painting people in their everyday lives and making full use of colour. Krohg first came to Skagen in the summer of 1878, encouraged by Georg Brandes, whom he had met in Berlin. He brought many of the latest international art trends with him, influencing the other members of the group. His encounters with the local population also exerted a strong influence on his own work.

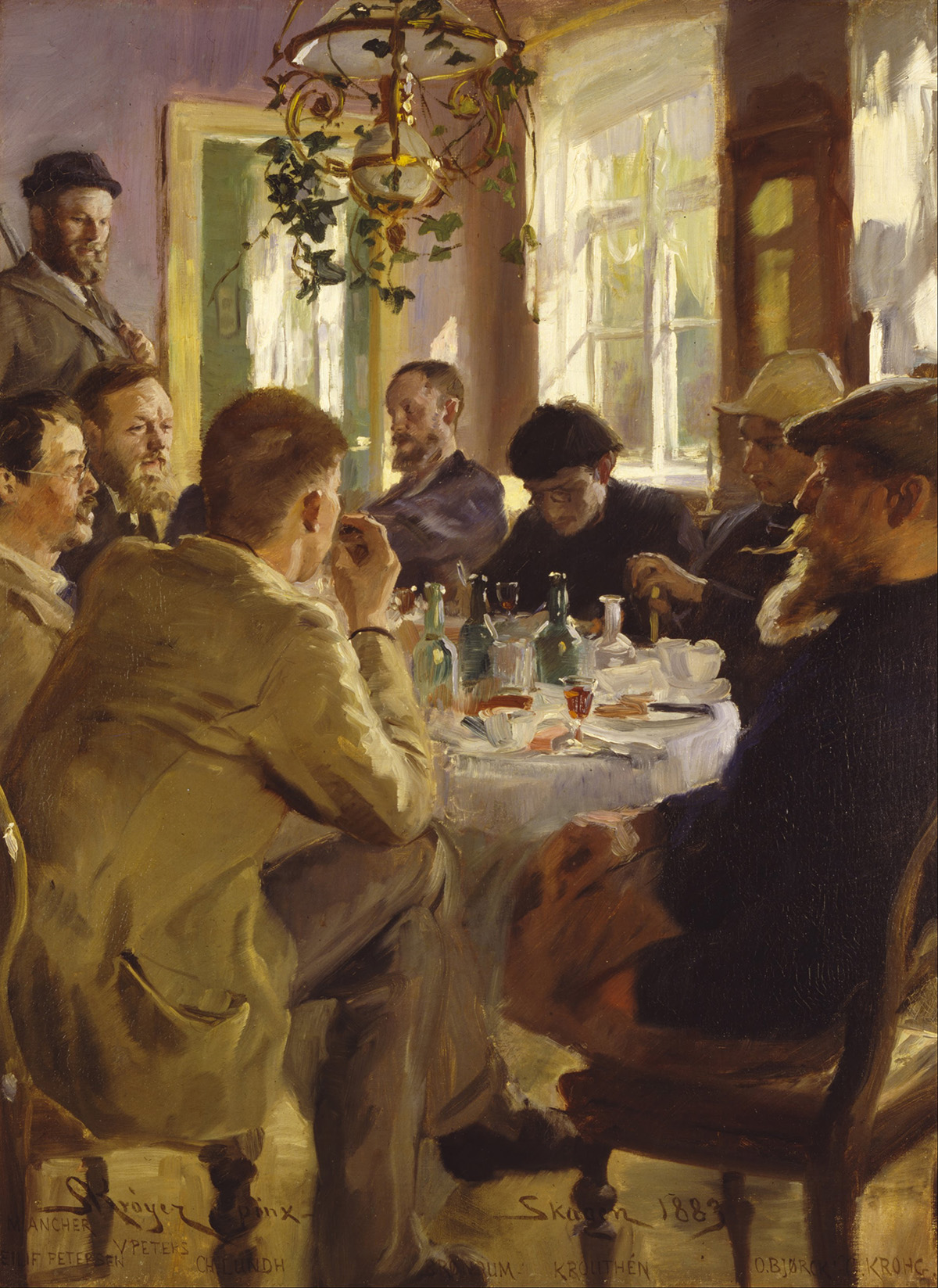
P.S. Krøyer: Artists at Lunch (1883)

In 1882, the Anchers travelled abroad. While they were in Vienna, they met P.S. Krøyer, who informed them he would also be going to Skagen that year, despite the fact that Ancher was apparently not too keen to have him there. Krøyer, who had enjoyed close contacts with several Impressionist artists in Paris, immediately became the central member and unofficial leader of the artists' colony. In 1883, he created the "Evening Academy" where the artists gathered to paint and discuss each other's work, often enjoying champagne. In 1884, the German painter Fritz Stoltenberg took photographs of the artists celebrating in the Anchers' garden, just after the couple had moved into their new home. One of these photos in particular inspired Krøyer to paint Hip, Hip, Hurrah!, which took him four years to complete.

In 1890, the railway's arrival in Skagen not only led to the expansion of the village but also brought in considerable numbers of tourists. It was largely responsible for breaking up the regular summer meetings of the artists as they could no longer find suitable accommodation or venues for their meetings. However, some of them purchased homes in Skagen: P.S. Krøyer in 1894, Laurits Tuxen in 1901 and Holger Drachmann in 1903.

Anna and Michael Ancher, Krøyer and Tuxen continued to paint in Skagen until well into the 20th century and were occasionally joined by their earlier friends. Two core members of the group, Drachmann and Krøyer, died in 1908 and 1909, bringing the traditional gatherings of the group to an end. There were nevertheless other painters, sometimes referred to as the younger group of Skagen painters, who continued to visit the area. They included Jørgen Aabye, Tupsy and Gad Frederik Clement, Ella Heide, Ludvig Karsten, Frederik Lange and Johannes Wilhjelm, some of whom settled in the area until the 1930s or even later. Skagens Museum has a number of their works in its collection. Another notable artist who visited Skagen from 1906 was J.F. Willumsen, who painted Children Bathing on Skagen Beach in 1909.

== Family relationships ==
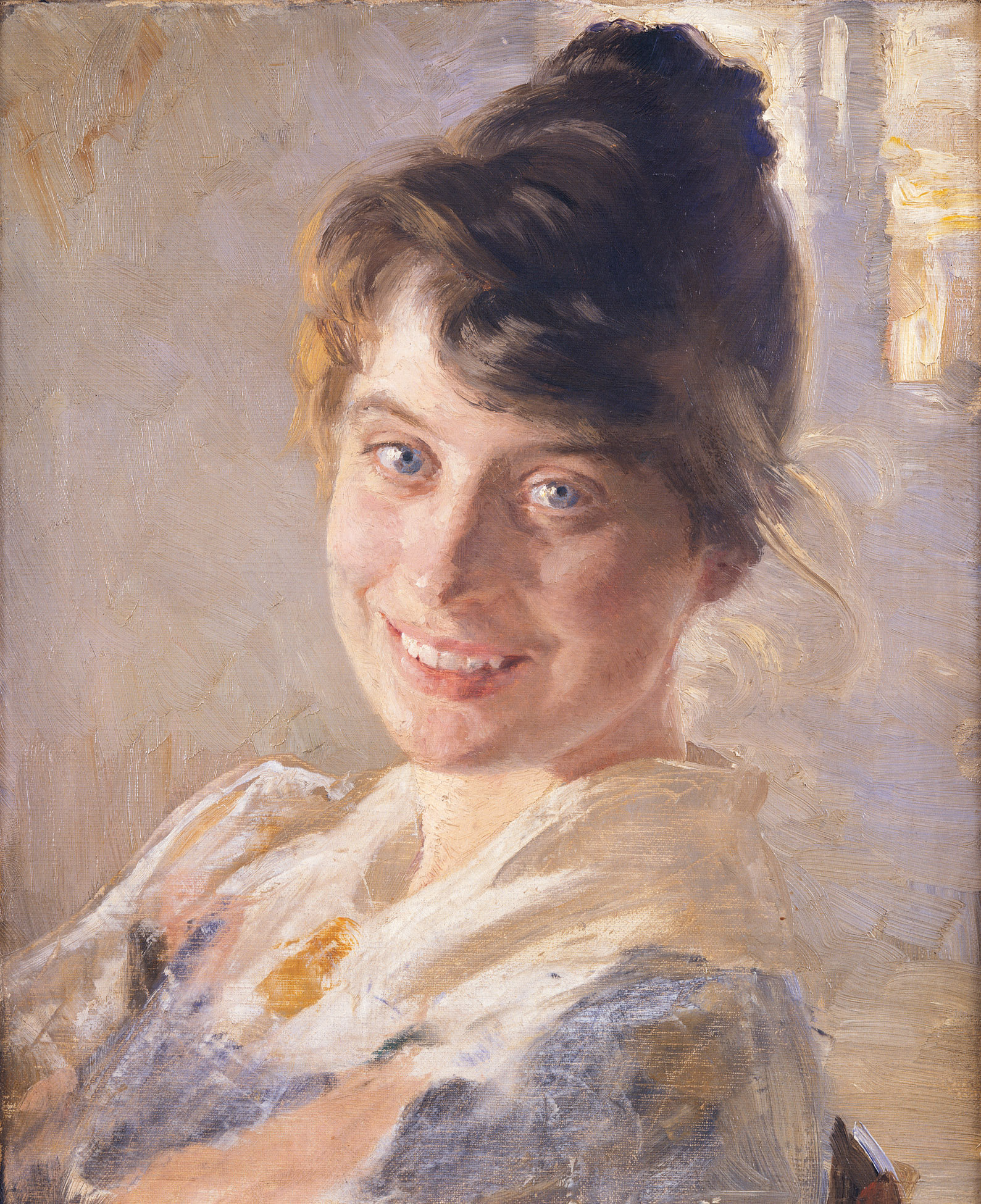
Marie Krøyer painted by her husband, P.S. Krøyer (1890)

The Skagen painters quickly began to form a close-knit community as relationships grew between the artists and the young women from the area. In 1880, Michael Ancher married Anna Brøndum from the guest house, Viggo Johansen married Martha Møller, Anna's cousin, and Karl Madsen married Henriette Møller, Martha's sister. Henriette died the next year in giving birth to a boy, named Henry Sofus Madsen (1881–1921). Until Karl Madsen remarried, Martha helped to take care of the boy. The house the Anchers moved into in 1884 became a focus for the artists' colony, especially as the couple lived there all the year round. When their daughter Helga (the little girl in Hip, Hip, Hurrah!) died in 1964, she left the house to a foundation which soon turned it into a museum. The Johansens acquired a large family between 1881 and 1886: Ellen Henriette (who became an artist and was presumably named after Martha's sister Henriette who died in childbirth three months earlier), Fritz, Lars, Gerda and Bodil. They can be seen dancing around the Christmas tree in Johansen's painting Merry Christmas.

Another key figure in Skagen, P.S. Krøyer, married Marie Triepcke after falling in love with her in Paris in 1888. The daughter of a prosperous German loomery engineer, she was said to be the most beautiful woman in Copenhagen. However, as the years went by, Krøyer's health began to deteriorate and Marie was increasingly unhappy with their marriage. The marriage finally ended in a divorce in 1905 when Marie became pregnant after an affair with the composer Hugo Alfvén, whom she then married. Krøyer died in Skagen four years later, apparently as a result of mental illness.

In 1901, after the death of his first wife Ursule, Laurits Tuxen married Frederikke Treschow, a Norwegian, and shortly afterwards purchased Madam Bendsen's house in Skagen where first Viggo and Martha Johansen and later Marie and P.S. Krøyer had stayed in the 1880s. He converted it into a stately summer residence. Michael Ancher and Laurits Tuxen died in 1927, Anna Ancher and Viggo Johansen in 1935.

== Members of the group ==
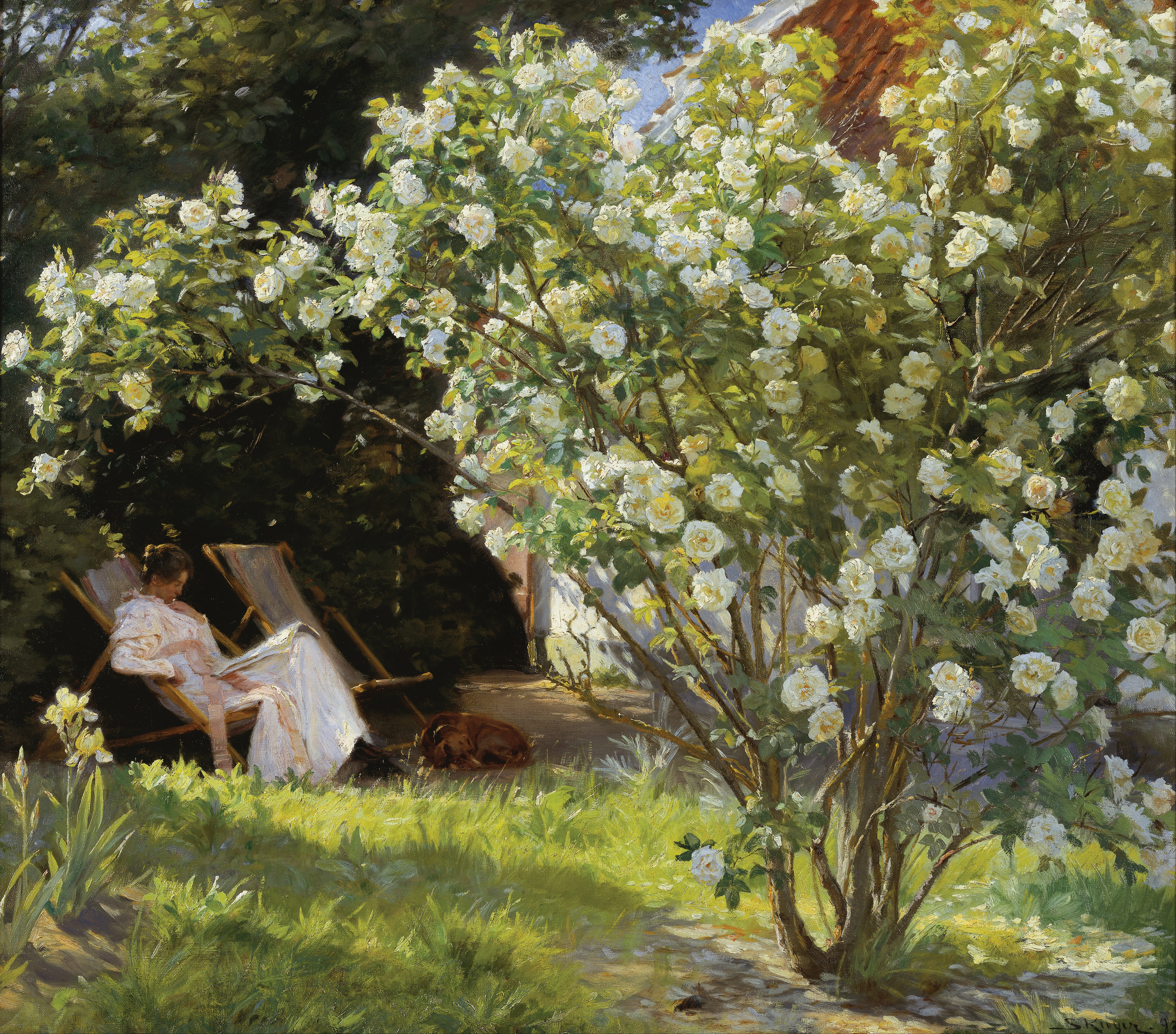
P.S. Krøyer: Roses (1893)

The principal Danish painters included Karl Madsen, Laurits Tuxen, Marie Krøyer, Carl Locher, Viggo Johansen, Thorvald Niss, and most notably, Anna and Michael Ancher and Peder Severin Krøyer. There were also painters from the rest of Scandinavia including Oscar Björck and Johan Krouthén from Sweden and Christian Krohg and Eilif Peterssen from Norway. The gatherings in Skagen were not restricted to painters. The Danish writers Georg Brandes, Holger Drachmann and Henrik Pontoppidan and the Swedish composer Hugo Alfvén were also members of the group.

A number of other artists also joined the Skagen Painters for shorter periods. From Denmark they included Vilhelm Kyhn, Einar Hein and Frederik Lange, from Norway Frits Thaulow, Charles Lundh and Wilhelm Peters, from Sweden Wilhelm von Gegerfelt and Anna Palm de Rosa, from Germany Fritz Stoltenberg and Julius Runge, and from England Adrian Stokes and his Austrian-born wife, Marianne Stokes. The Danish composer Carl Nielsen and his wife Anne Marie, a sculptor, also spent summers in Skagen and eventually bought a summerhouse there.

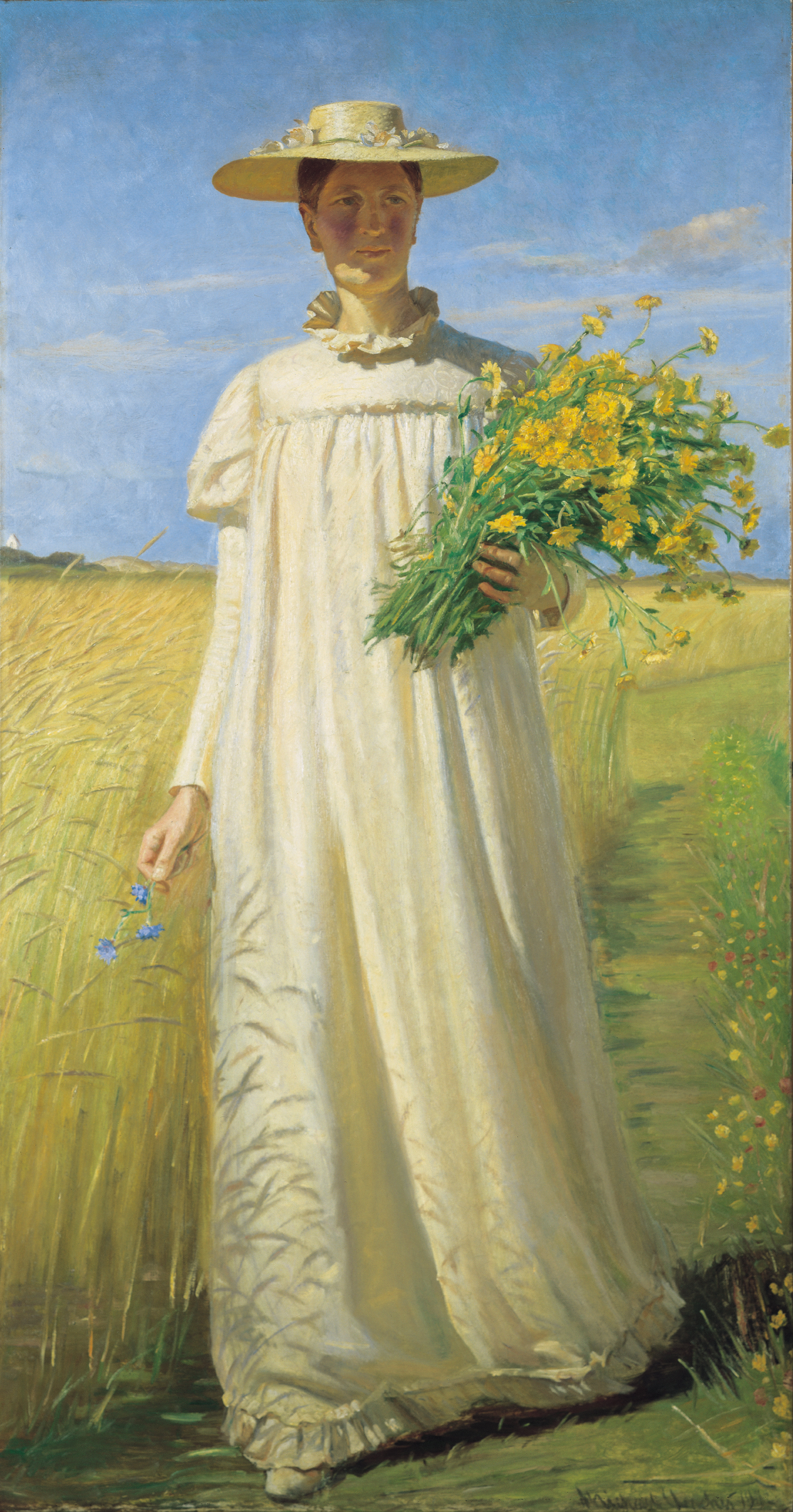
Michael Ancher: Anna Ancher returning from the fields (1902)

=== Anna Ancher ===
The only member of the group born in Skagen, Anna Ancher (1859–1935), was the daughter of Erik Brøndum, the owner of the grocery shop and guest house which later became Brøndums Hotel. Inspired by the artists who stayed there, she received her first lessons from Karl Madsen, Viggo Johansen and Michael Ancher. From 1875, she spent several winters in Copenhagen at Vilhelm Kyhn's school for women painters. As a result of her portraits of family and friends as well as her skills as a colourist, she is considered to be one of Denmark's finest artists although all her talents were not fully appreciated until after her death. Her works depict scenes from the home, children and women and religious life in Skagen. She now stands out as a pioneer at a time when women were not expected to become artists and were not admitted to the Royal Danish Academy. Unlike her husband, she adopted a style of Realism, inspired above all by Christian Krohg. Commenting on her Blind Woman (1882) in which the face is illuminated in an otherwise dark portrait, Madsen pointed out that she was the first Danish artist to depict a sunbeam. Her most cherished works include Girl in the Kitchen (1886), Sunlight in the Blue Room (1891) and A Mission Meeting (1903).

=== Michael Ancher ===
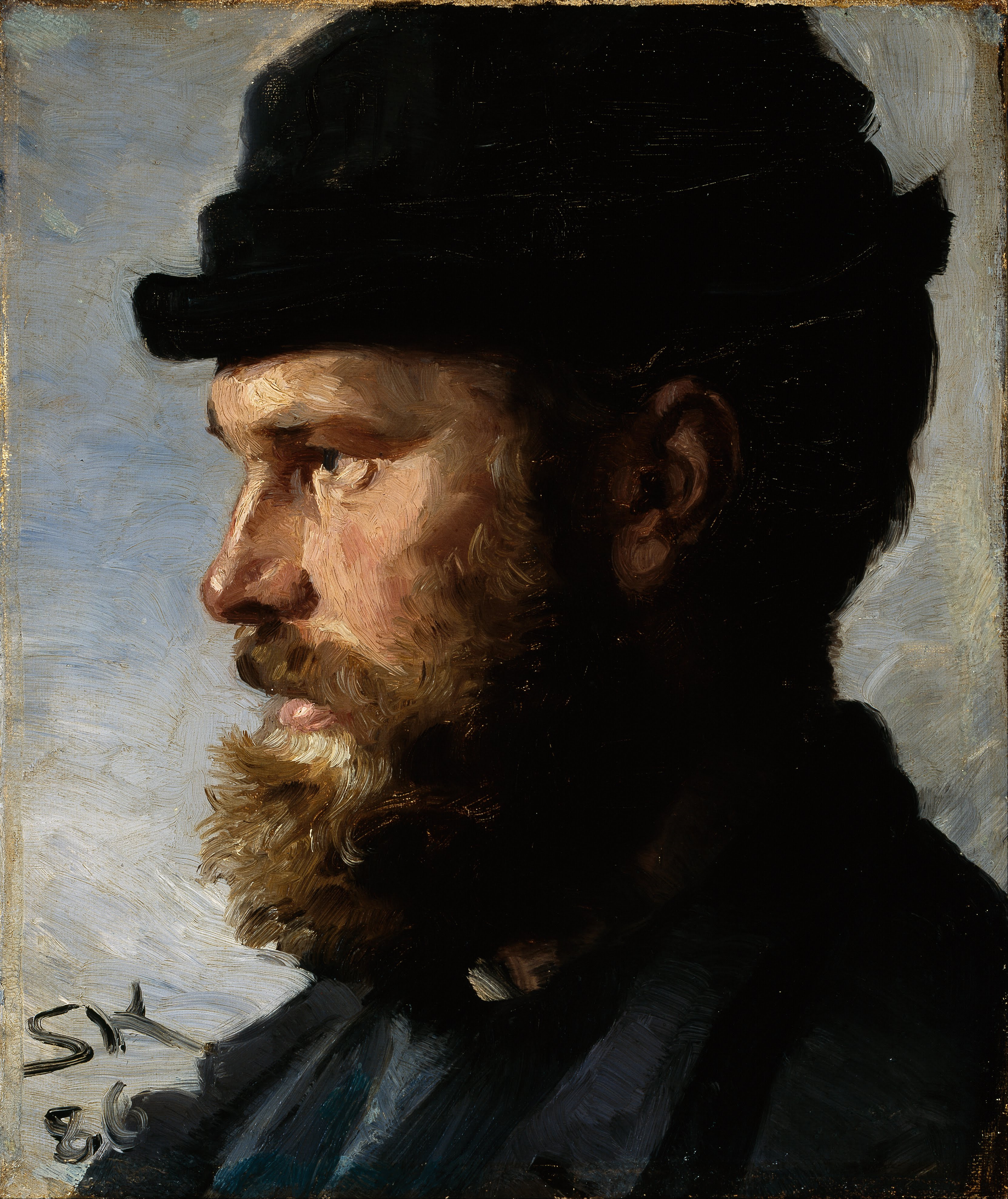
P.S. Krøyer: Michael Ancher (1886)

Michael Ancher (1849–1927), originally from the island of Bornholm, was invited to Skagen in 1874 by his friend Karl Madsen with whom he was studying at the academy. In 1880, he married Anna Brøndum and settled in Skagen. He achieved his artistic breakthrough in 1879 with the painting Will he Round the Point? which was bought by Christian IX. Several other works by Ancher depict Skagen's heroic fishermen and their dramatic experiences at sea, combining Realism and with classical composition. Key works include The Lifeboat is Carried Through The Dunes (1883), The Crew Are Saved (1894) and The Drowned Man (1896). He also painted portraits and landscapes, especially of Skagen's Østerby district. Many of his paintings can be seen in Skagens Museum. Michael Ancher has become one of Denmark's most cherished painters.

=== P.S. Krøyer ===
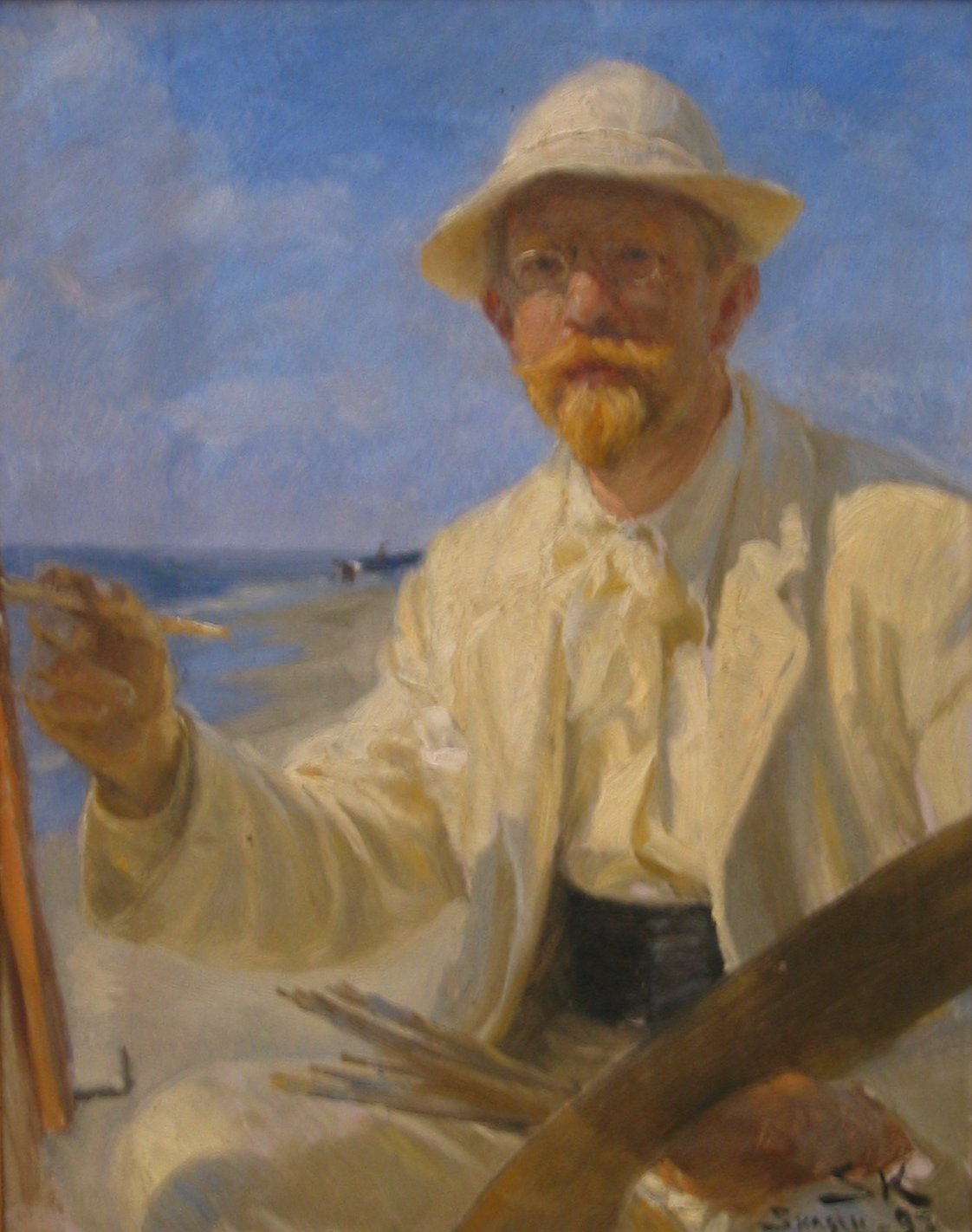
P.S. Krøyer: Self-portrait (1899)

Born in Stavanger, Norway, but brought up in Copenhagen, Peder Severin Krøyer (1851–1909) came to Skagen in 1882 and returned almost every summer, finally settling there after marrying Marie Triepcke in 1889. He had already gained a reputation for his paintings of the fishermen in Hornbæk on the north coast of Zealand and had been influenced by the Impressionist movement in his travels to France. In Skagen, he became one of the central and most enthusiastic members of the group of painters, creating masterpieces emphasizing the special effects of the local light in his beach scenes while painting several memorable works recording the lively gatherings of the artists. Key works include Summer Evening on Skagen's Southern Beach (1893), In the Grocer's Store When There is No Fishing (1892), and Midsummer Eve Bonfire on Skagen Beach (1906) which shows many members of the community including Krøyer's daughter Vibeke, mayor Otto Schwartz and his wife Alba Schwartz, Michael Ancher, Degn Brøndum, Anna Ancher, Holger Drachmann and his third wife Soffi, Hugo Alfvén and Marie Krøyer.

=== Viggo Johansen ===
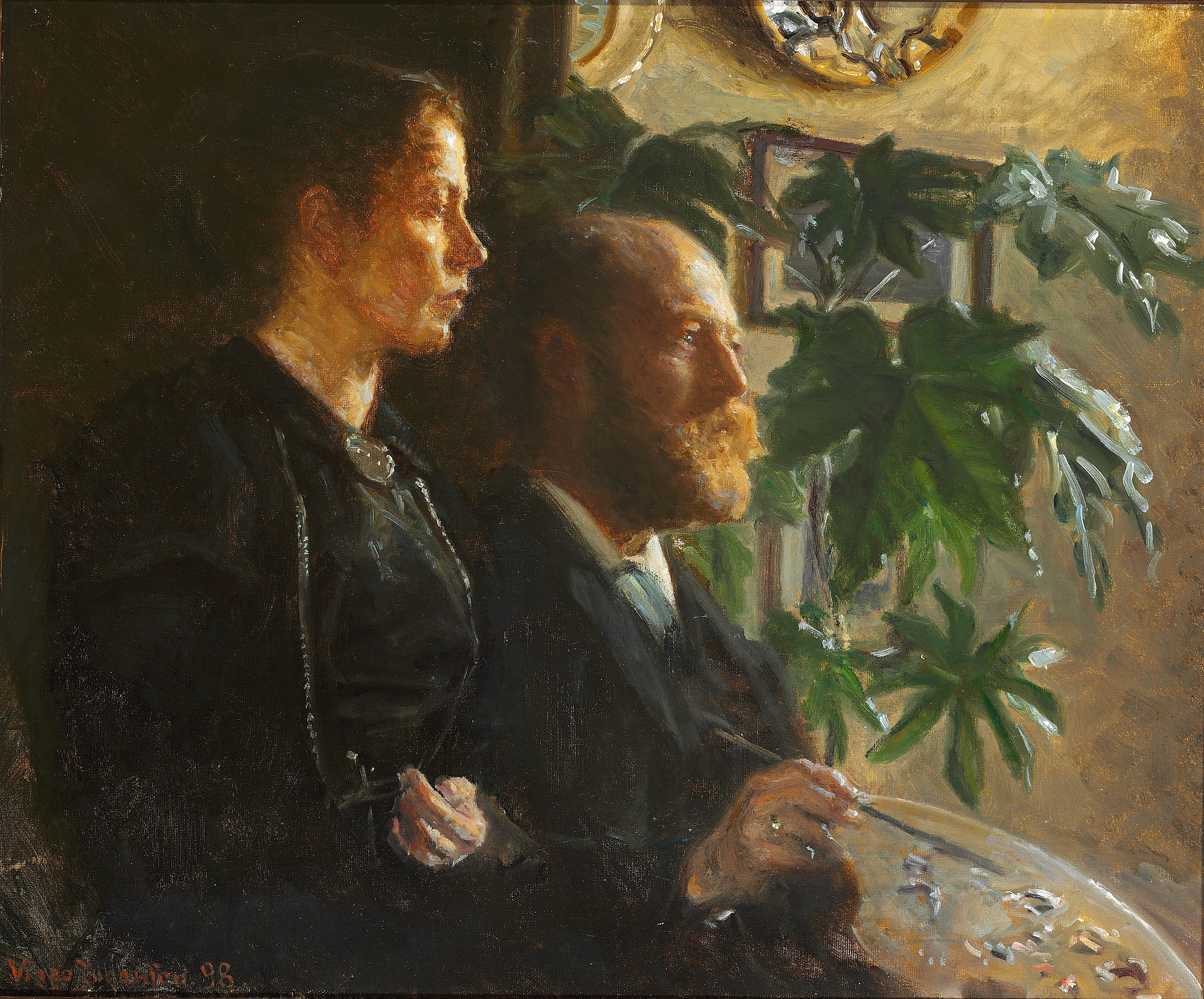
Viggo Johansen: Self-portrait with wife Martha (c. 1895)

Viggo Johansen (1851–1935), who had studied at the Royal Academy with Michael Ancher (also without graduating), first went to Skagen in 1875. An active member of the group, he married Anna Ancher's cousin Martha Møller in 1880. From 1885, he exhibited in Paris where he was inspired by Claude Monet. His paintings took on lighter tones as he had noted the absence of black in the works of the French artists and considered his own earlier works too dark by comparison. Monet's use of colour is reflected in his painting Christian Bindslev is ill (1890). The work displays stronger contrasts than his earlier paintings, depicting the red-bearded Christian looking out towards the light at the foot of his bed where the flaming gold and white sunlight streams down onto the little blue cupboard on the wall. Among the works he painted in Skagen are Kitchen Interior (1884) which depicts his wife Martha arranging flowers, and the much brighter Dividing the Catch (1885) showing four fishermen who have pulled their boat up onto the beach while one of their wives hopes there will be something for the evening meal. After falling out with P.S. Krøyer in 1891, Johansen's relationship with the Anchers was strained and he and his family did not visit Skagen for several years but finally returned in 1903. In 1906, he became a professor at the Royal Academy where he was director from 1911 to 1914.

=== Carl Locher ===
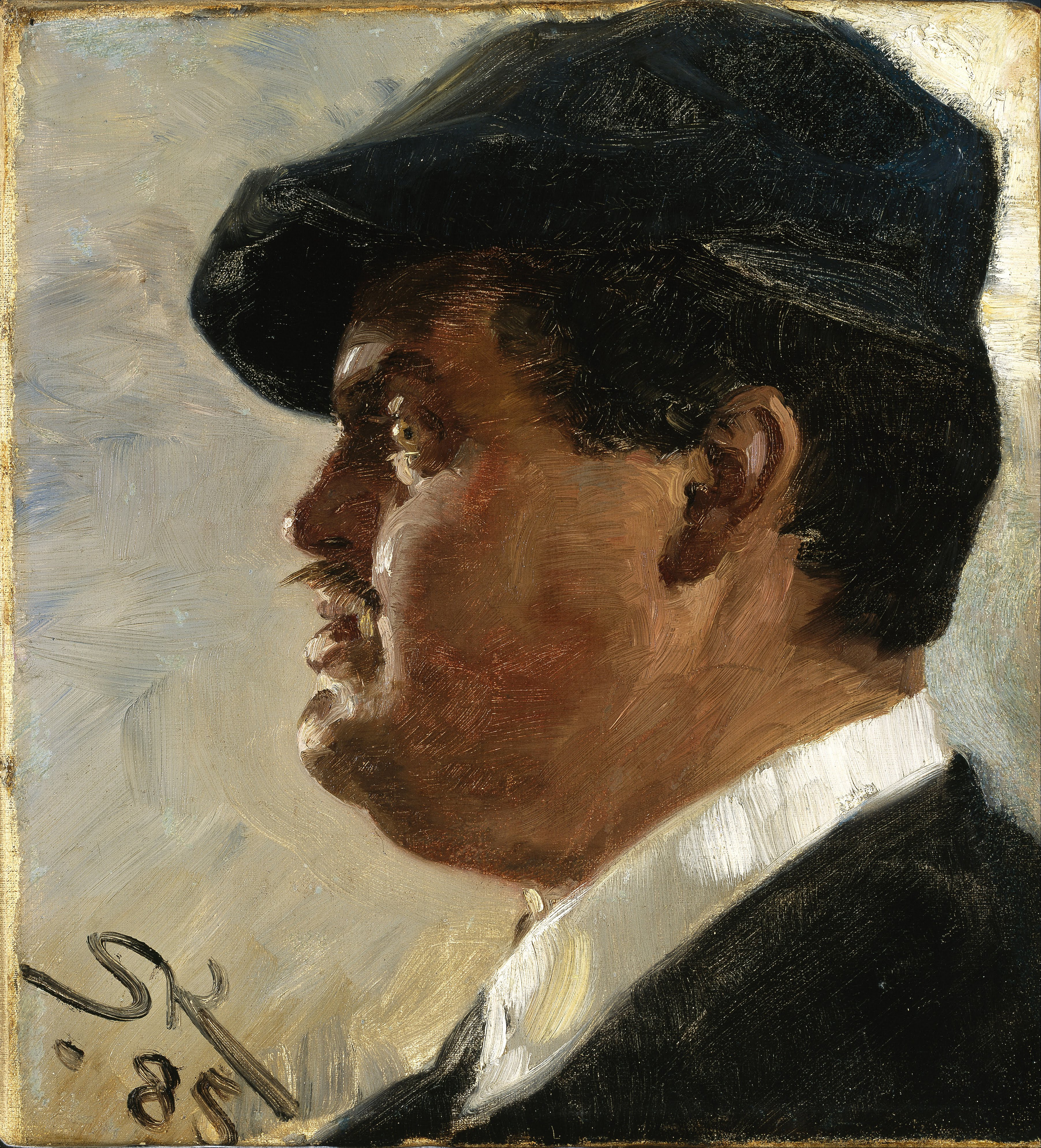
P.S. Krøyer: Carl Locher (1885)

Somewhat forgotten today, Carl Locher (1851–1915) was one of the earlier visitors to Skagen. Holgen Drachmann, who had taught him before he attended the Royal Academy, persuaded him to go there in 1872. Especially interested in marine painting, Locher adopted a realist impressionistic approach, influenced by the time he spent with Léon Bonnat in Paris during the 1870s. A stickler for perfection, especially in his drawings, his works cover the transition from sailing ships to steamships and from the original Skagen to the evolving tourist destination. His paintings include Fishing Cutters in the Moonlit Night, 1888, The Lightship at Skagen Reef (1892) and above all The Mail Coach (c. 1890) which depicts the horse-drawn carriage which until the railway reached Skagen in 1890 was the way travellers arrived there from Frederikshavn. In 1910, Locher built a house overlooking the beach at Skagen Østerby where he painted until he died of heart trouble in 1913.

=== Laurits Tuxen ===
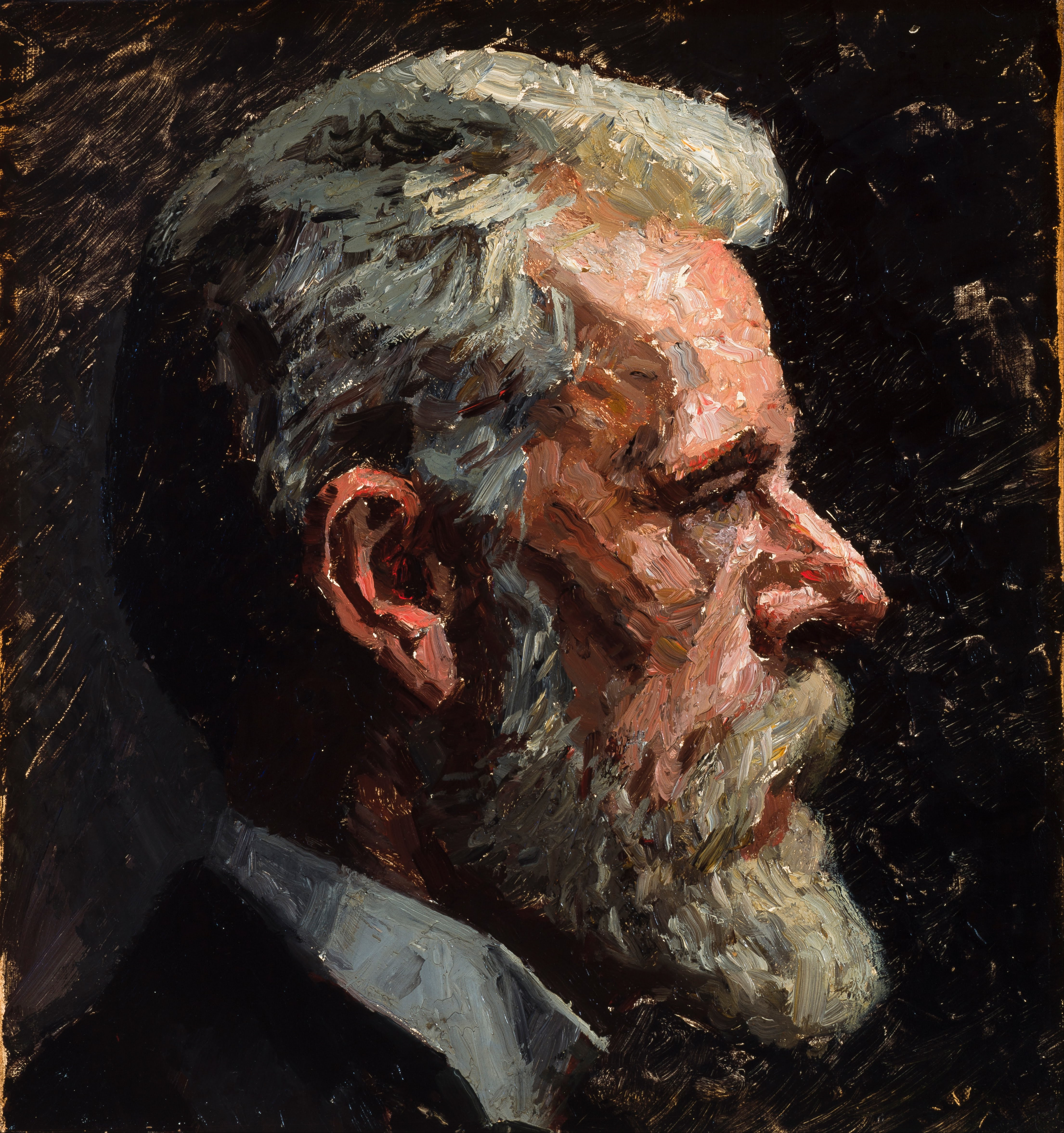
Laurits Tuxen: Self-portrait (1911)

Born and raised in Copenhagen, Laurits Tuxen (1853–1927) studied at the Royal Danish Academy together with P.S. Krøyer where he was considered to be one of the best painters. In 1875, he began to study in Paris in Léon Bonnat's studio with whom he also worked in subsequent years. His Suzanna i Badet (1878), first painted in Paris, was warmly received in the Copenhagen spring exhibition in 1879. He first visited Skagen in 1870 but after a few more visits in the 1870s, did not return until 1901. After his first wife died of tuberculosis, he married the Norwegian Frederikke Treschow and bought a house in Skagen. There he painted a number of pictures depicting family and friends as well as landscapes. Among the works from Skagen are The North Sea in Stormy Weather (1909), the powerful The Drowned Boy is Brought Ashore (1913) inspired by paintings of drownings he saw in France and Pouring the Morning Coffee (1906) depicting Tuxen's wife Frederikke and his daughters Yvonne and Nina in their Skagen home, Villa Dagminne. Through his use of colour, brushstrokes and backlighting through the window flowers, the artist creates a homely atmosphere. Tuxen's most famous paintings are however his portraits of European royal personalities, including Christian IX of Denmark, Queen Victoria and Czar Nicholas II.

=== Christian Krohg ===
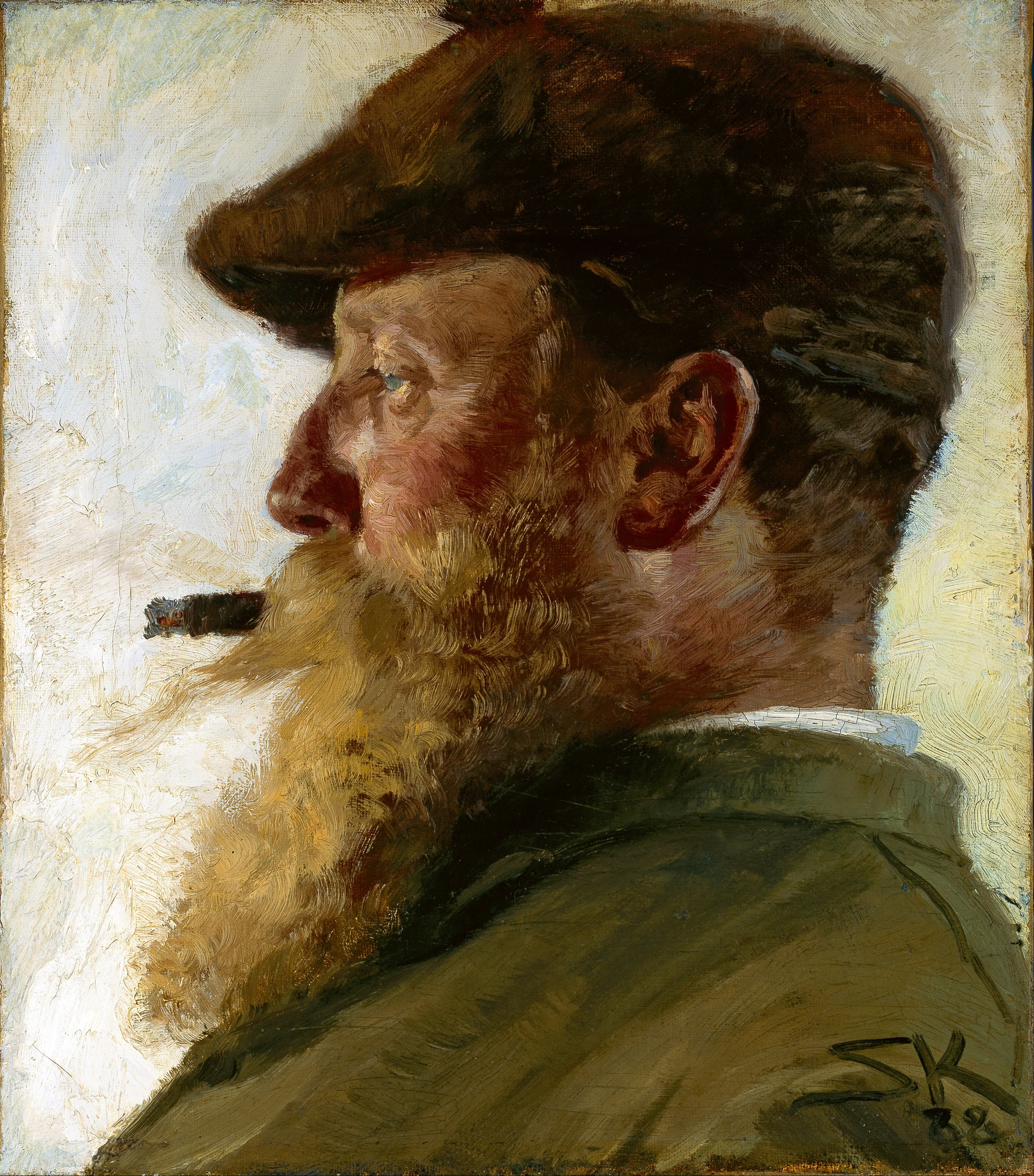
P.S. Krøyer: Christian Krohg (1888)

The Norwegian Christian Krohg (1852–1925) first visited Skagen with Frits Thaulow in 1879. One of the most important figures in Norwegian art, he first studied law but his interest in art was triggered by his friendship with fellow student Eilif Peterssen. He attended J.F. Eckersberg's painting school in Christiania (now Oslo) before moving to Karlsruhe and Berlin where he studied under Karl Gussow, specializing in figure painting in the new idiom of Realism. In Berlin, he also developed a friendship with Georg Brandes. In 1879 he returned to Christiania before travelling to Skagen where he achieved his artistic breakthrough, attracted by the simple lives of the local fishermen. Depicting a fisherman at sea, his Babord litt (1879) is considered to be one of his early masterpieces. His association with Ancher, Krøyer and the other members of the colony had a marked effect on his style as can be seen in the works he painted on returning to Norway. He went to Paris in 1881–82, where was influenced by Édouard Manet and the Impressionist movement. His experience of French art can be seen in several of his later Skagen paintings, including Tired (1885) and Braiding Her Hair (1888) in which the mother and child unusually have their backs facing the observer. His lighter palette with bold brushstrokes and contrasting tones of blue, red and green give the painting a deeper texture.

=== Marie Krøyer ===
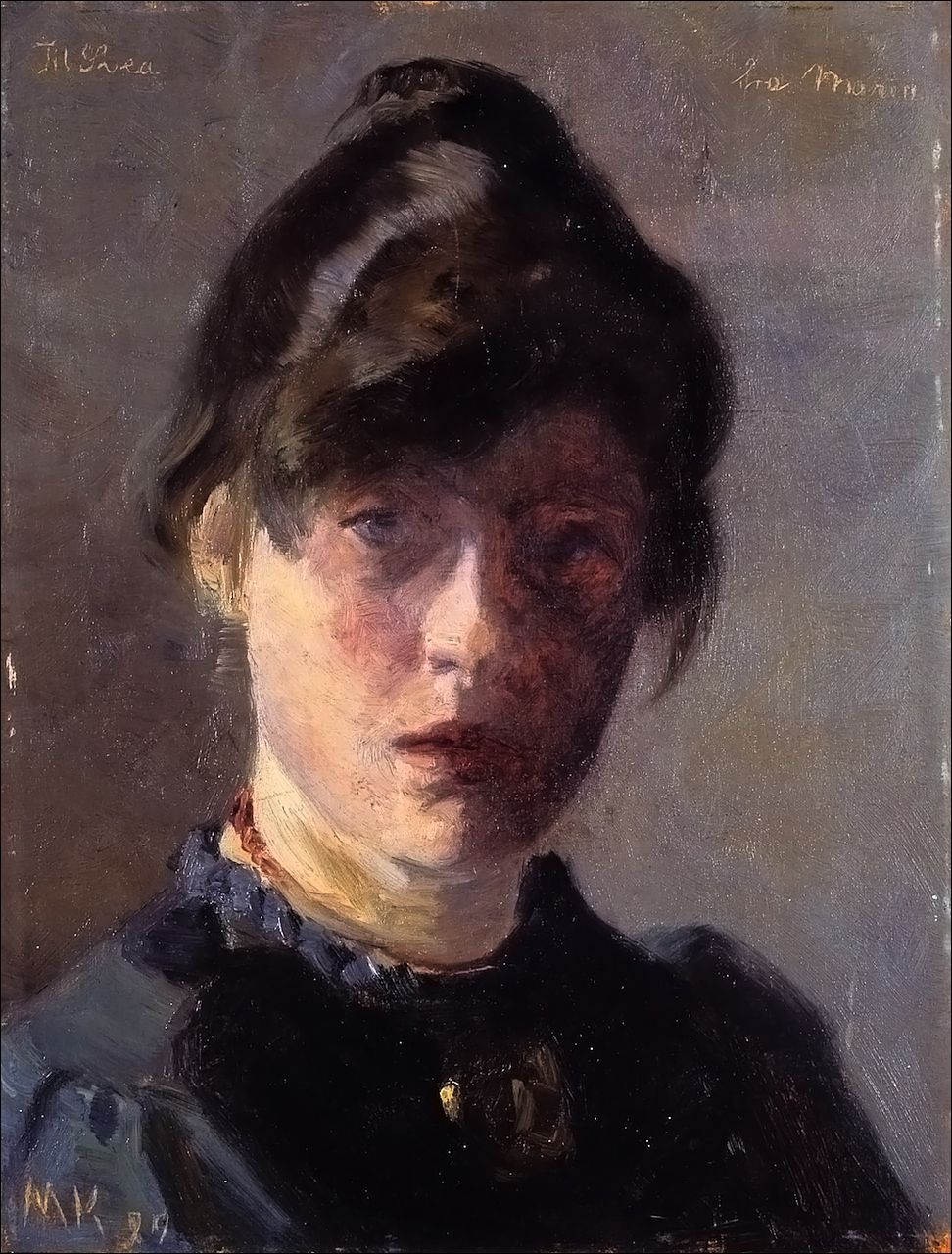
Marie Krøyer: Self-portrait (c. 1900)

Marie Krøyer, née Triepcke (1867–1940), came from a well-to-do German family living in Copenhagen. From an early age she aspired to become an artist and after training privately she went to Paris to continue her studies. It was there, in early 1889, that she met P.S. Krøyer, who immediately fell madly in love with her. Although he was 16 years her senior, the couple married that summer. In 1891, they settled in Skagen, giving P.S. ample opportunity to paint portraits of Marie, both indoors and especially on the beach. The summers P.S. Krøyer spent together with his wife in the 1890s were clearly a source of inspiration for him, especially as Marie had a strong sense of beauty herself, often quoting Keats' "Beauty is truth, truth beauty". As a result of the periods of mental illness P.S. Krøyer experienced from 1900, the marriage fell apart. In 1912, Marie married Hugo Alfvén, who had also been taken by her beauty. It is believed Marie was reluctant to paint after meeting Krøyer, whom she looked up to as a far more competent artist. A few of her works have nevertheless survived, including Interior with Girl Sewing.

== Styles of painting ==
P.S. Krøyer: Summer Evening at Skagen Beach – The Artist and his Wife (1899)

Encouraged by the Modern Breakthrough movement led by Georg Brandes, the early painters were attracted by Skagen's village community, its seascapes and culture, all far removed from the effects of industrialization on city life. Their painting styles evolved from the formal Neoclassical approach of the Royal Academy in Copenhagen to embrace the evolving European trends in Realism and Impressionism, including the plein air approach adopted by the Barbizon School. The artists were especially attracted by the opportunities for painting en plein air, focusing on the activities of the local fishermen and their modest cottages. In the absence of any rules within the colony, the painters freely developed their individual styles. Nevertheless, one of the interests they shared was to paint scenes of their own social gatherings, whether playing cards, celebrating or simply eating together.

By adopting the plein-air approach, the painters were able to create their works in the open, immediately capturing the special effects of light and colour on their subjects. Fishermen were considered an especially interesting group in view of their dangerous work and their heroic behaviour. Lars Kruse, depicted by Michael Ancher, was famous for his success in rescuing a number of sailors who would otherwise have drowned. P.S. Krøyer's works were less dramatic, depicting fishermen pulling their nets in after a day at sea. While some of the paintings portrayed authentic occurrences, the artists often paid the fishermen to act as models, supplementing their modest incomes. Krøyer's works also included scenes of walks on the beach, romantic evenings in the moonlight and portraits of his wife Marie. As time went by, Krøyer increasingly painted "moods", works which depicted the special atmosphere of the "Blue Hour" which developed in the evening as the sky merged with the sea. In addition to his commissions from the royal courts of Europe, Laurits Tuxen is remembered for painting the flowers in his garden. Anna Ancher's paintings, on the other hand, focused on interiors of the home, including women and children, in a more abstract, colouristic style.

== Skagens Museum ==
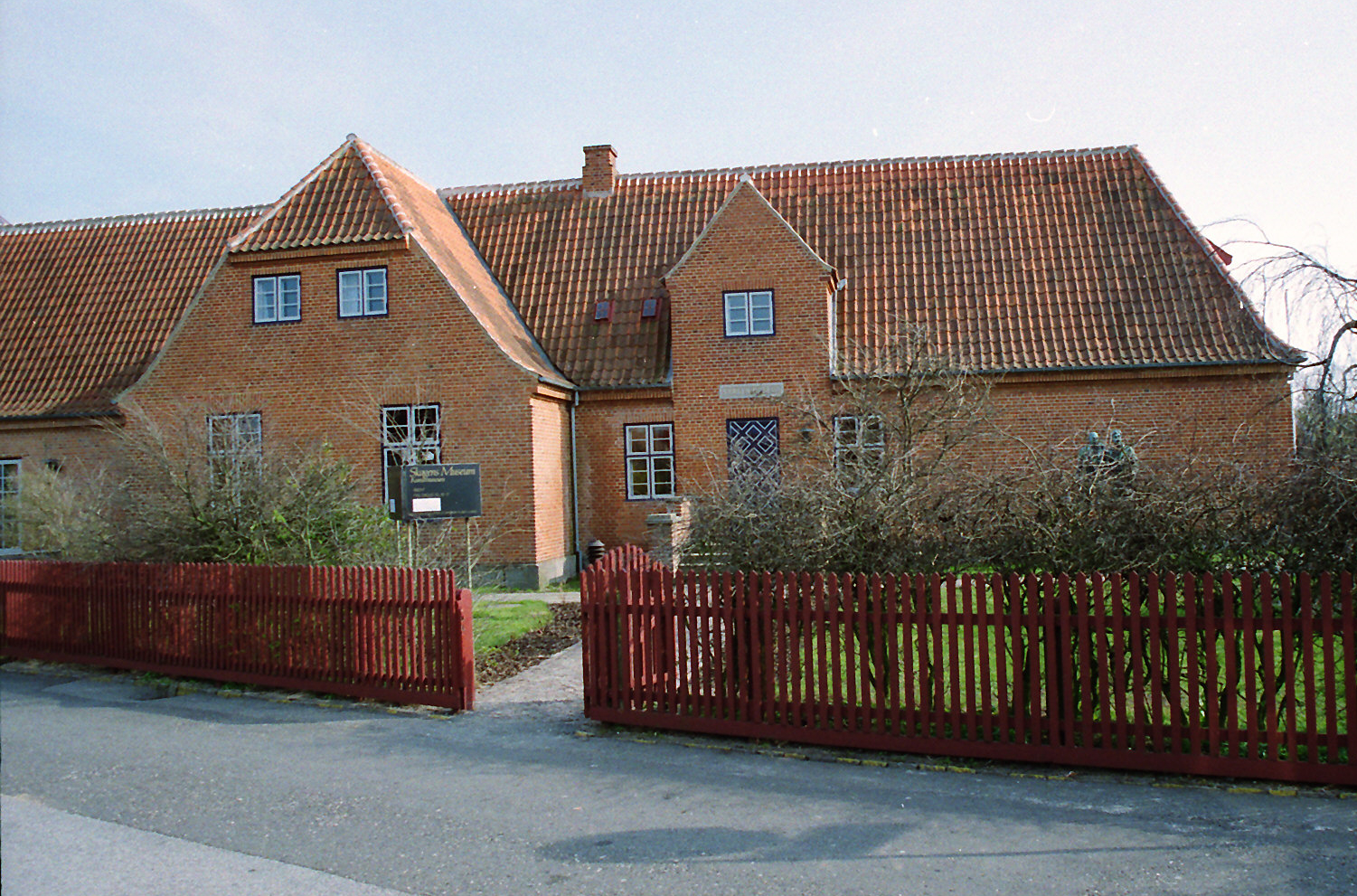
Skagens Museum, as it looked in 1996, located in the old garden of Brøndums Hotel

Skagens Museum was founded in the dining room at Brøndums Hotel in October 1908. Victor Christian Klæbel, the local pharmacist, Degn Brøndum, proprietor of Brøndums Hotel and Anna Ancher's brother, and Michael Ancher, Krøyer and Tuxen were elected to form the first board of governors. After P.S. Krøyer's death in 1909, his house in Skagen Plantation was used as a museum. In 1919, Degn Brøndum donated the old hotel's garden to Skagens Museum as a site for a new building. Work started in 1926 and was completed in September 1928 when the new museum was officially opened.

In 1982, the exhibition rooms were extended with an annex designed by the Royal Surveyor, architect Jacob Blegvad, who also planned the later extension to the museum inaugurated in 1989. In 1997, the museum administration moved into the Technical School. In 2014, the museum underwent a substantial, two-year extension of its main building, as well as a merger with the two historic house museums Anchers Hus and Drachmanns Hus. Today the collection now total almost 9,000 works. A selection of these works are on display at Skagens Museum. Many of the museum's paintings have been digitized under the Google Art Project and are accessible online.

== Films ==
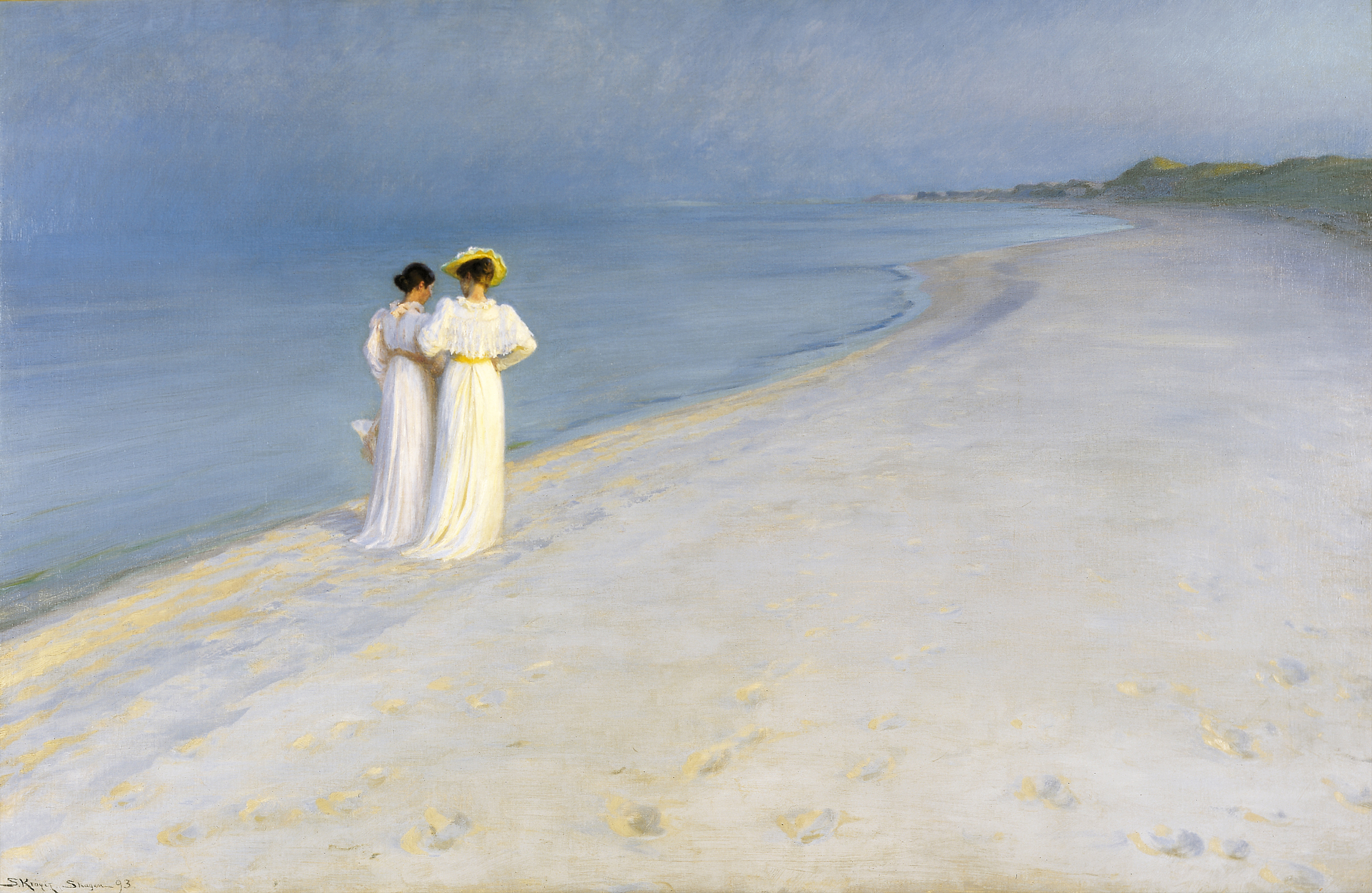
P.S. Krøyer: Summer Evening on Skagen's Southern Beach, one of Krøyer's most cherished images (1893)

The Skagen artists were the subject of the 1987 film Hip Hip Hurra! by the Swedish director Kjell Grede, inspired by Krøyer's famous painting.

In 2012, the film The Passion of Marie, directed by Bille August, dramatized Marie's increasingly difficult relationship with her husband P.S. Krøyer. The film is based on the book Balladen om Marie by Anastassia Arnold.

== Exhibitions ==
There have been a number of exhibitions of the Skagen Painters in recent years. In 2008, the Arken Museum of Modern Art in Copenhagen presented "The Skagen Painters — In a New Light", contrasting the paintings depicting the artists with those of the fishermen. In 2011, the Hirschsprung Museum in Copenhagen succeeded in arranging the largest exhibition of Krøyer's work titled : "Krøyer—i internationalt lys" (Krøyer—in international light), with works from museums and private collections in France, Germany, the United States and Scandinavia. The National Museum of Women in the Arts in Washington, D.C. presented "A World Apart: Anna Ancher and the Skagen Art Colony" in 2013. It was the largest exhibition of Anna Ancher's paintings ever held in the United States. In 2014, Skagens Museum, which frequently presents new aspects of the work of the Skagen Painters, concentrated its efforts on "Laurits Tuxen—colour, countryside and crown", presenting many works held in private collections illustrating the artist's involvement in establishing Kunstnernes Studieskole (The Artists' School of Study) in Copenhagen as well as his work as a court painter.

A major exhibition of paintings by the Skagen Painters titled Michael Ancher – P.S. Krøyer: Venner og Rivaler (Friends and Rivals) is to be held at Arken, Copenhagen from 27 September 2014 to 12 April 2015.

== Gallery of paintings ==
The gallery presents a selection of paintings by the Skagen artists, roughly in chronological order.

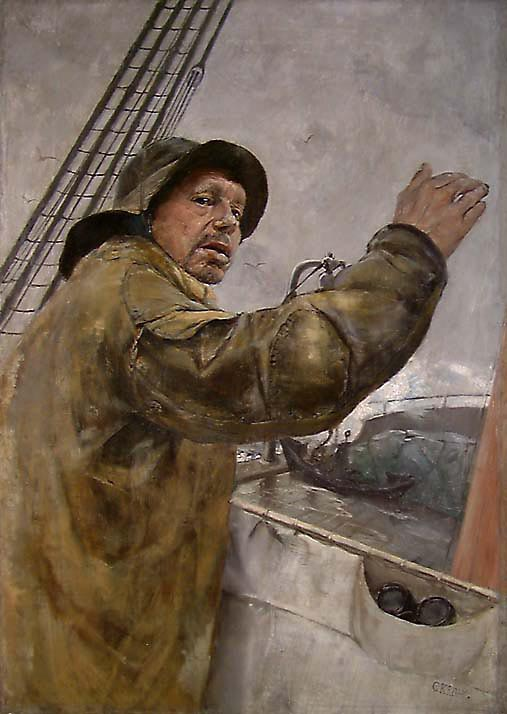
Portside, Christian Krohg, 1879

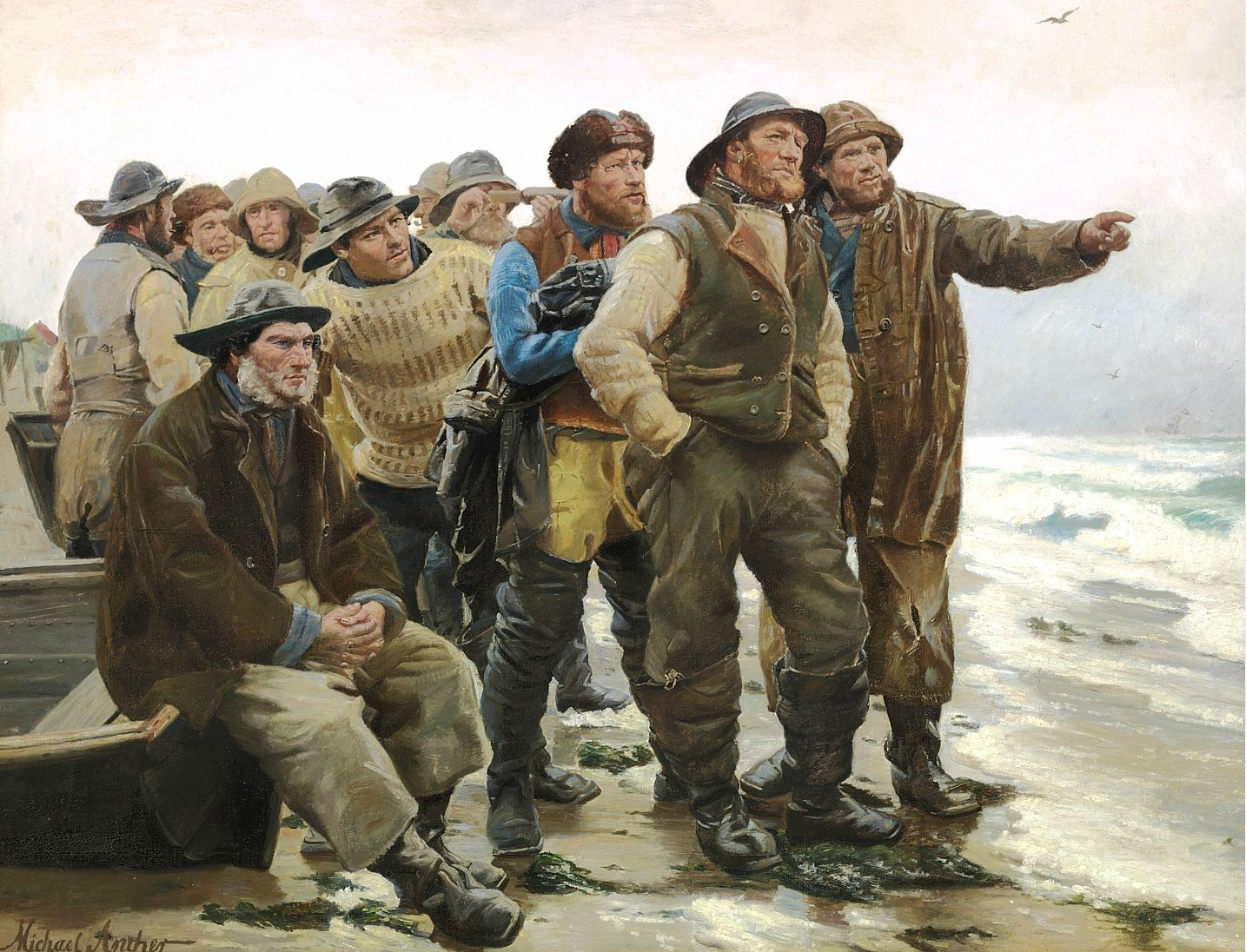
Will He Round the Point?, Michael Ancher, c. 1880

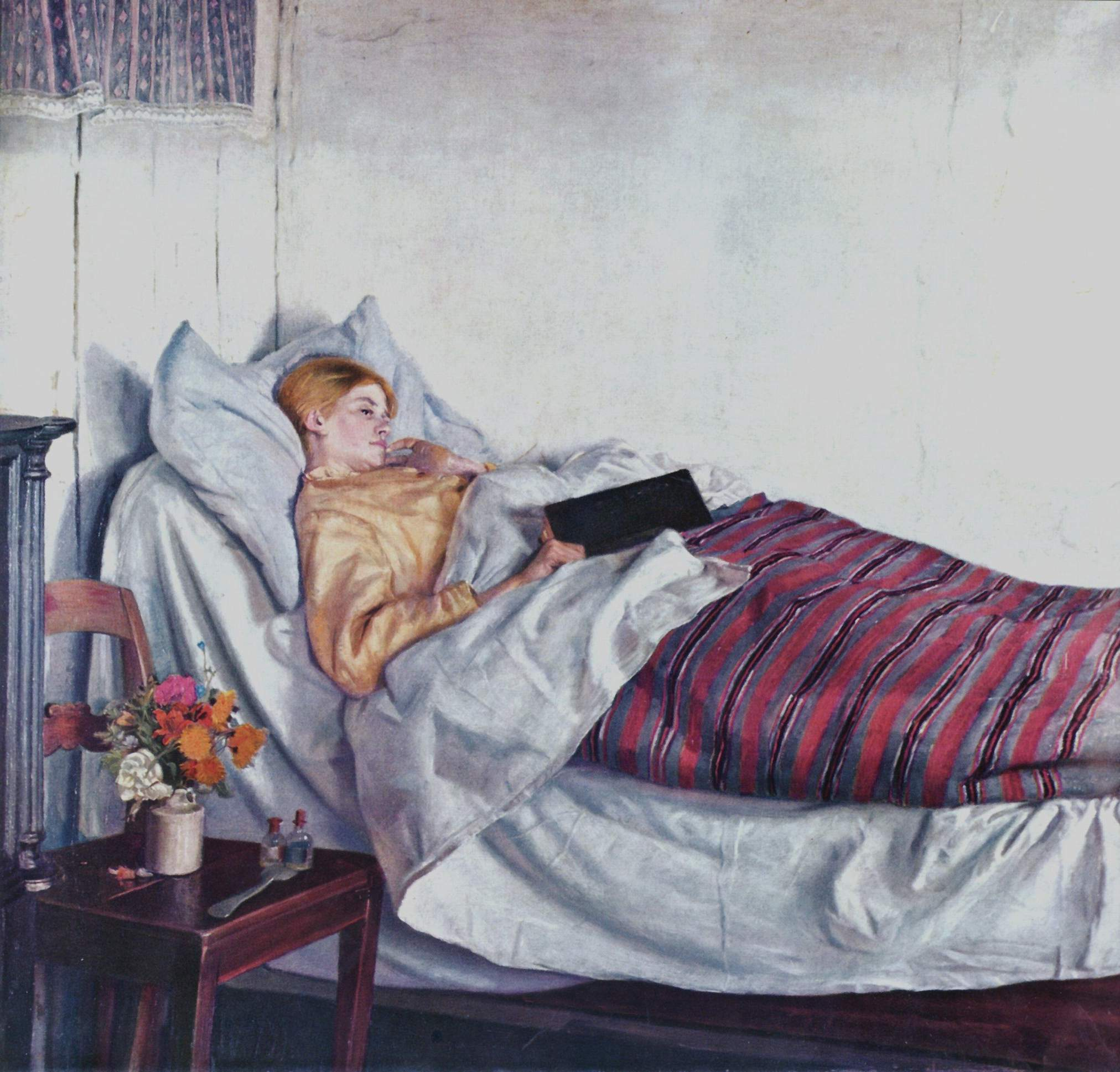
The Sick Girl, Michael Ancher, 1882

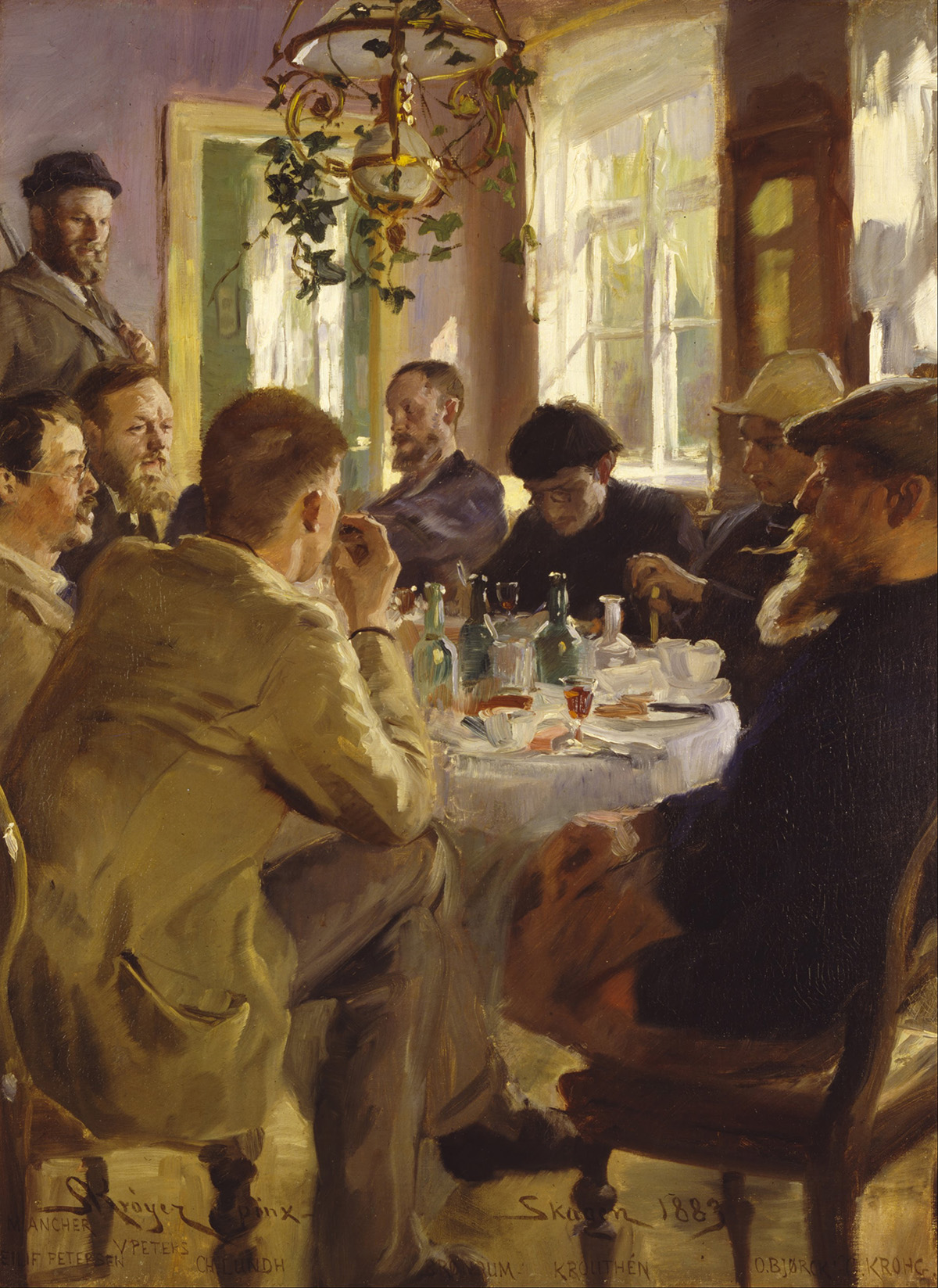
Artists' luncheon at Skagen, P.S. Krøyer, 1883

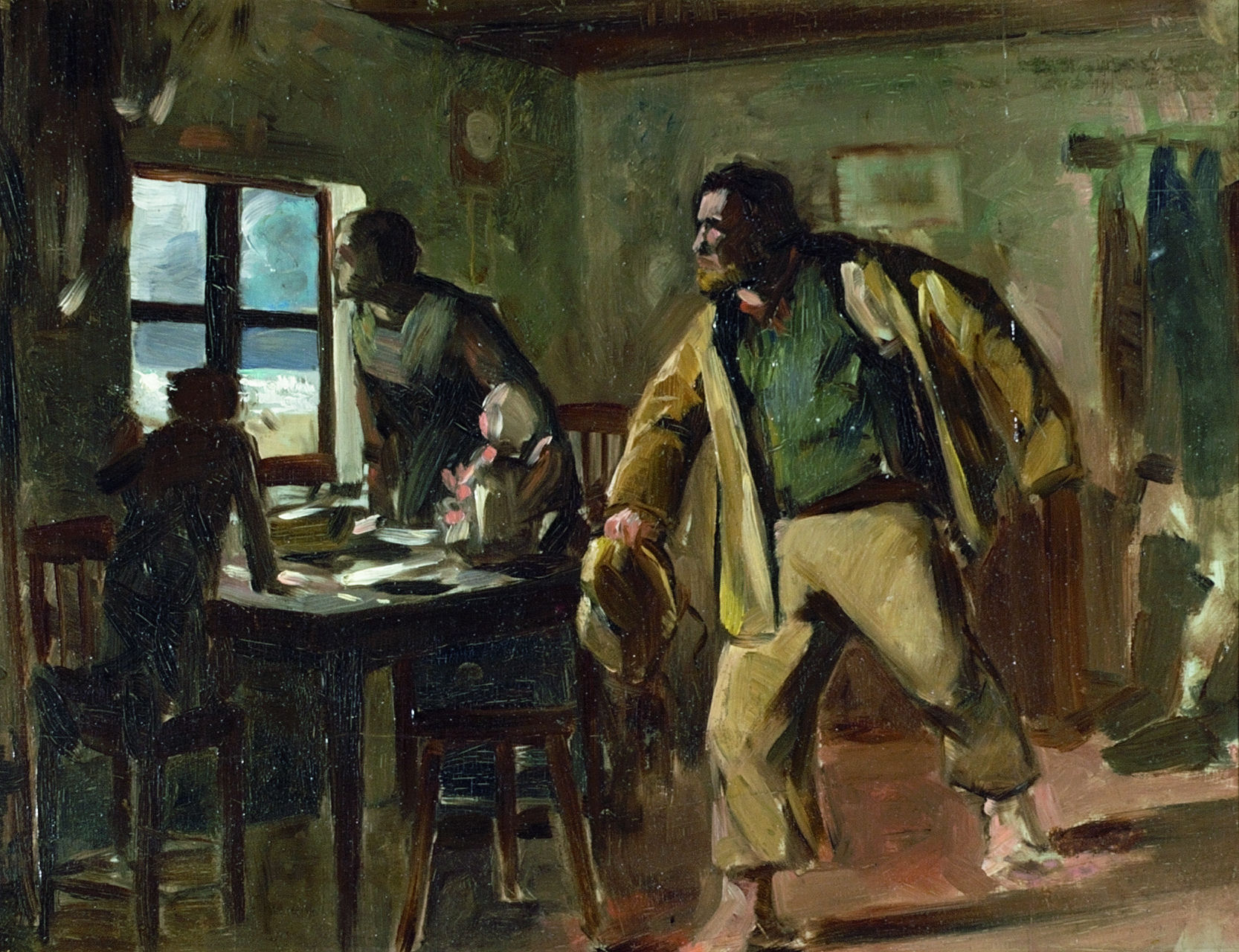
Signal of Distress, Oscar Björck, 1883

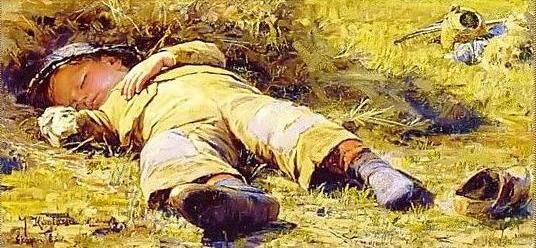
Sleeping Boy, Johan Krouthén, 1883

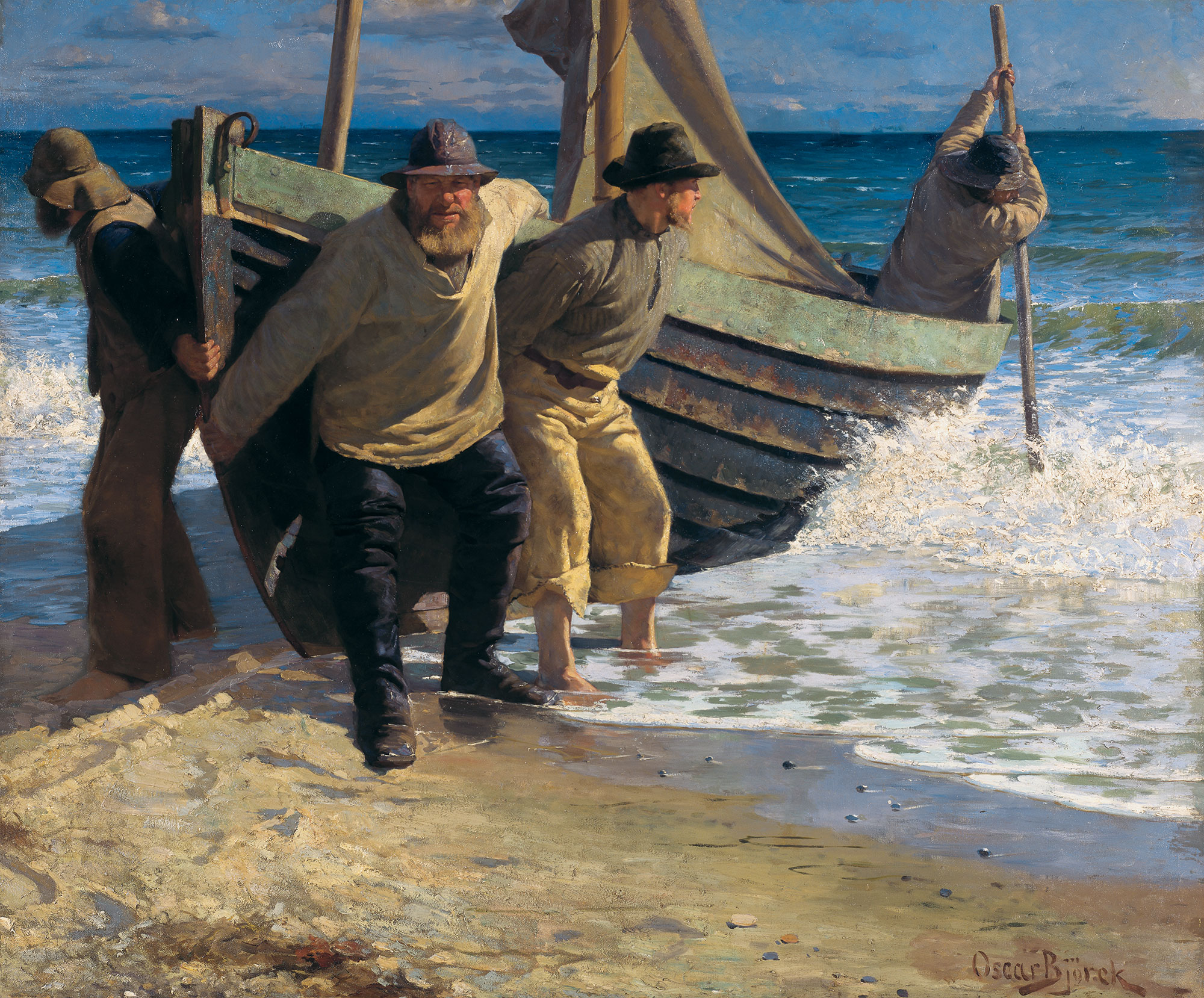
Launching the Boat. Skagen, Oscar Björck, 1885

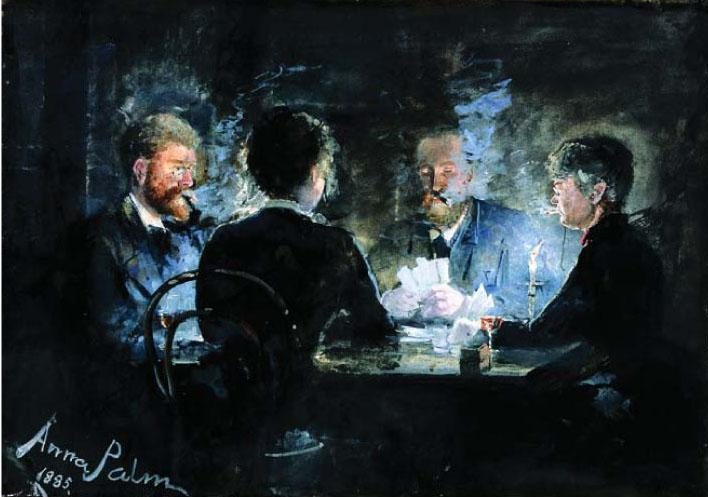
A Game of l'Hombre, Anna Palm de Rosa, 1885

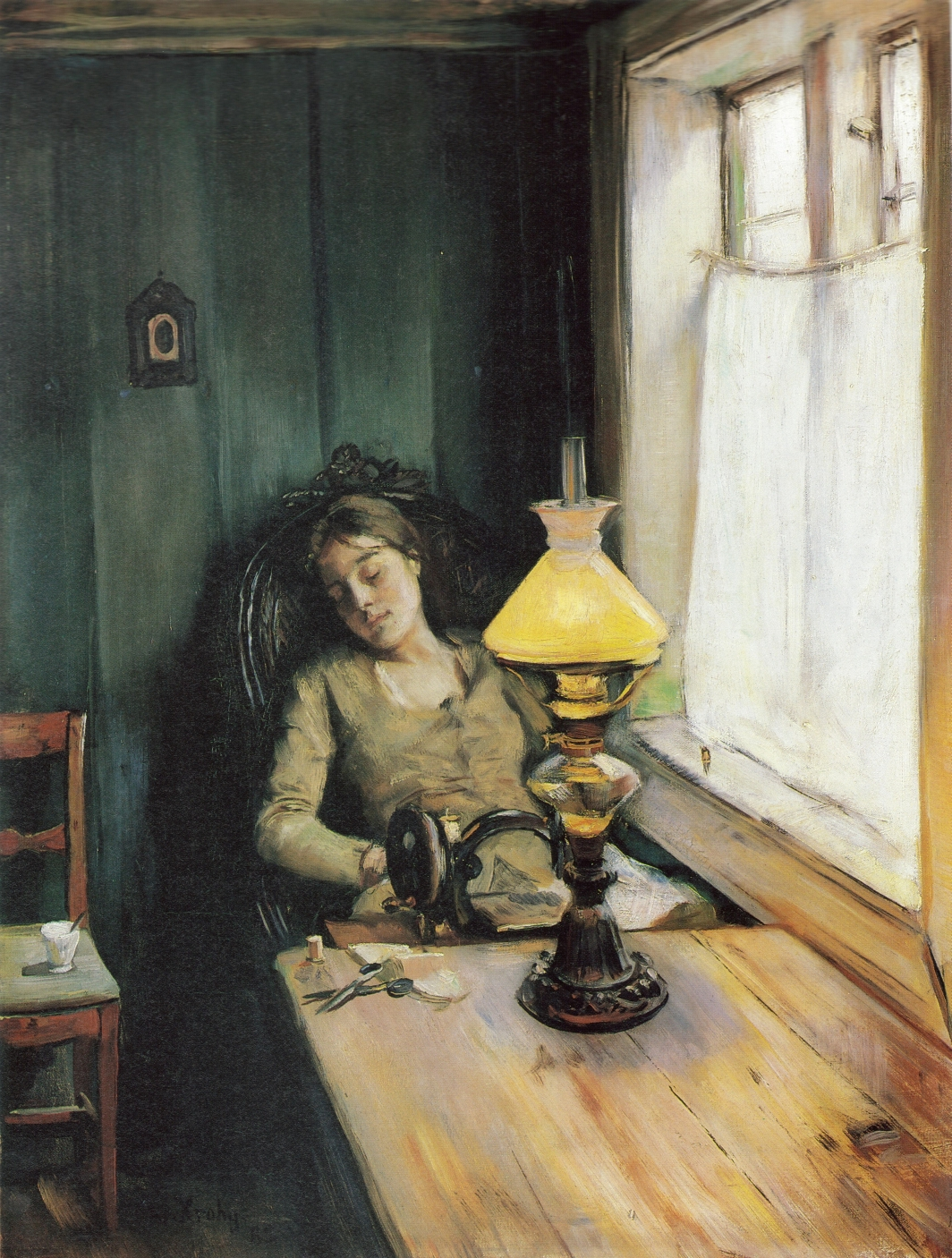
Tired, Christian Krohg, 1885

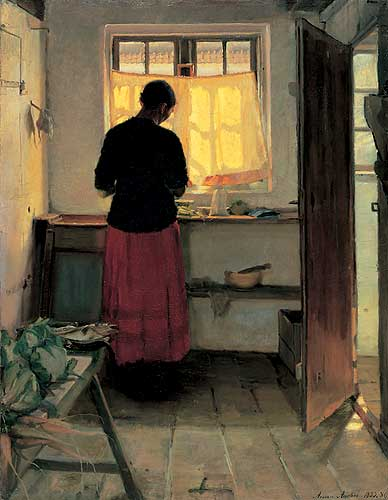
Girl in the Kitchen Anna Ancher, 1886

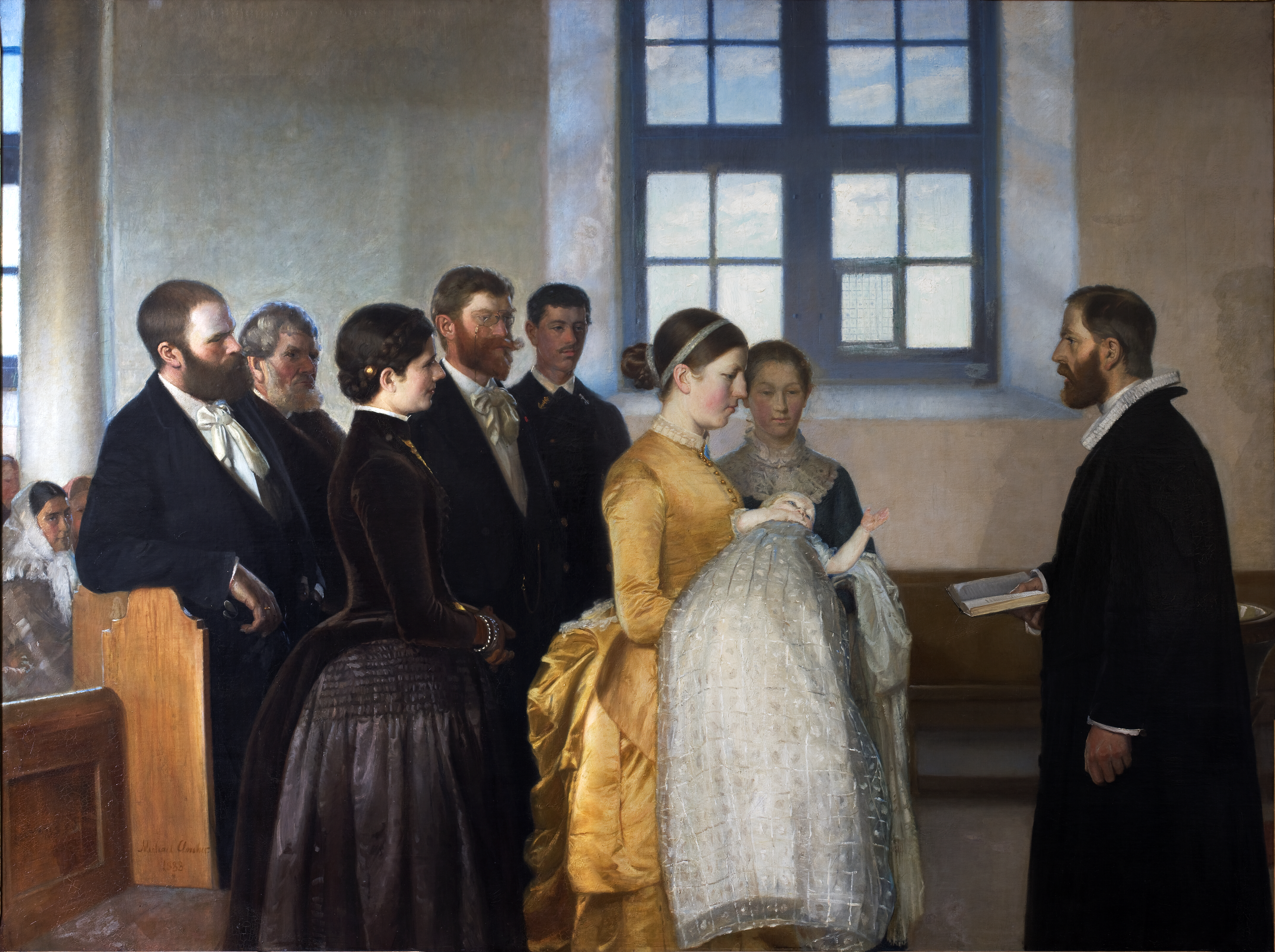
A Christening, Michael Ancher, 1888

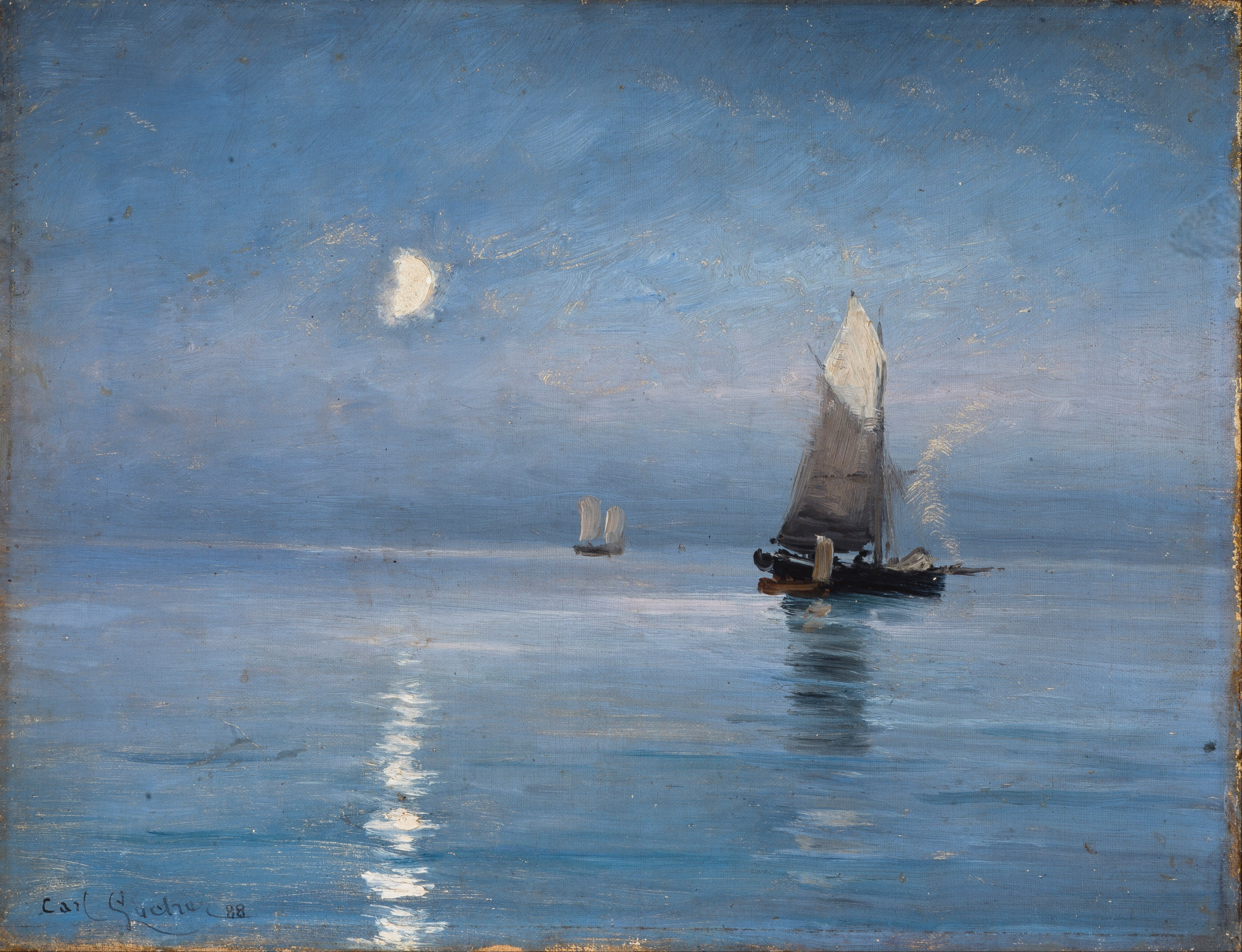
Fishing Cutters in the Moonlit Night, Carl Locher, 1888

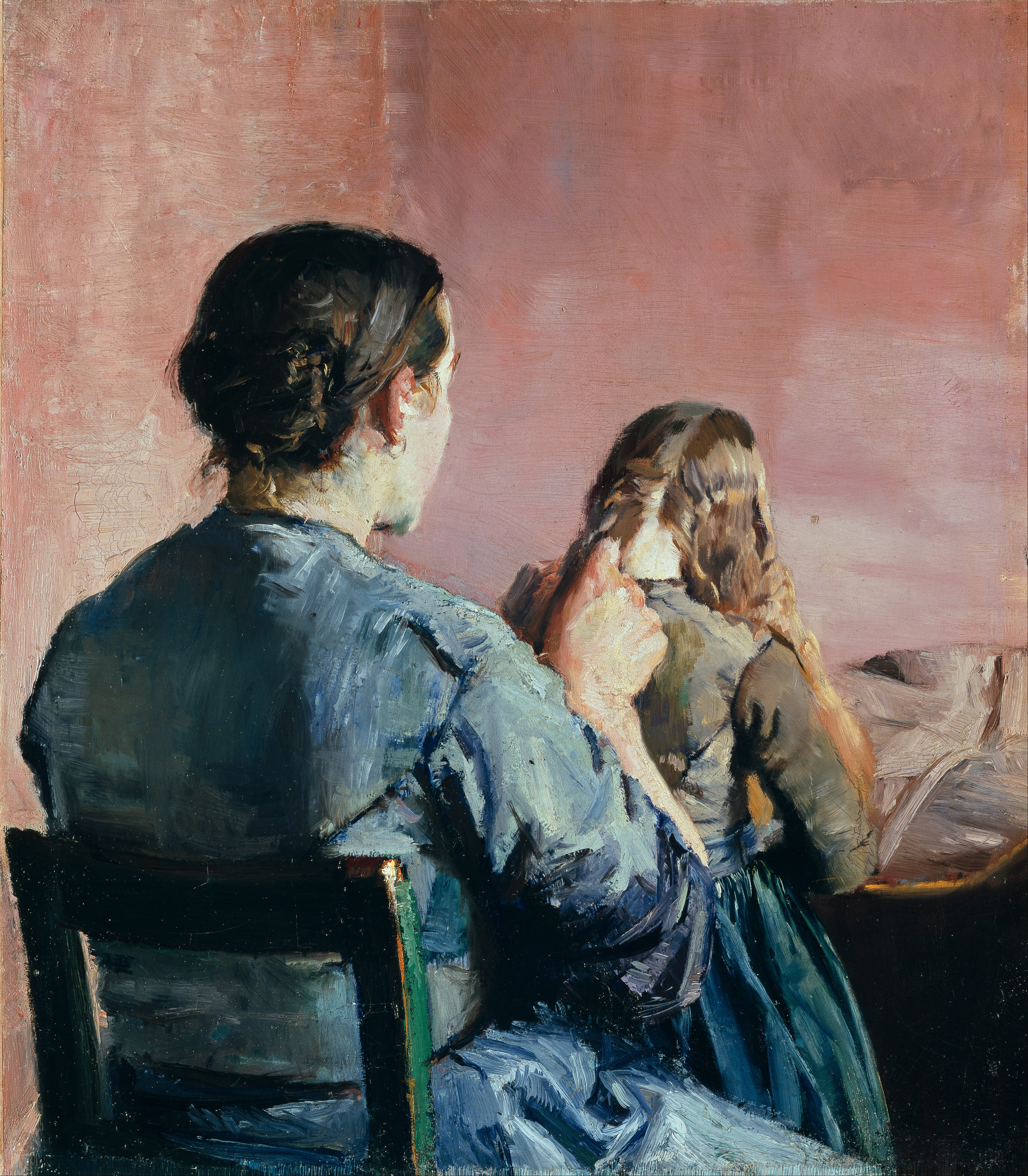
Braiding Her Hair, Christian Krohg, 1888

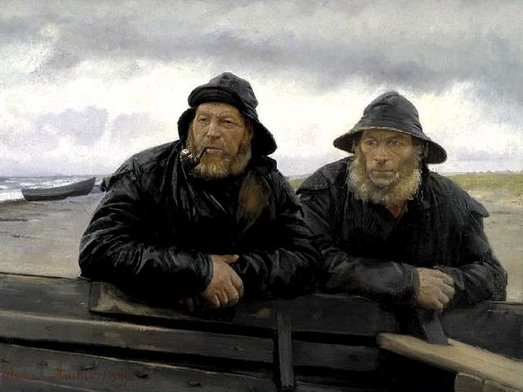
Two Fishermen, Michael Ancher, 1889

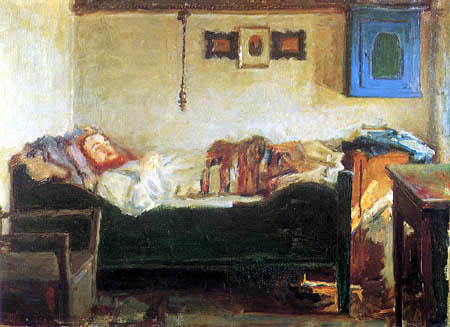
Christian Bindslev is Ill, Viggo Johansen, 1889

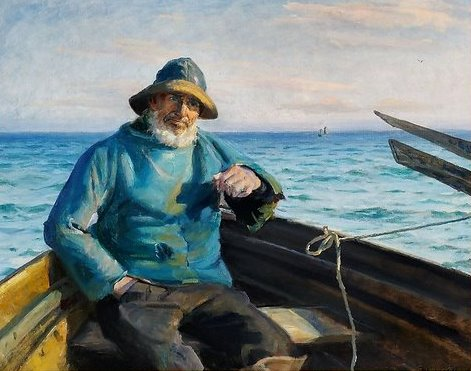
Skagen Fisherman, Michael Ancher

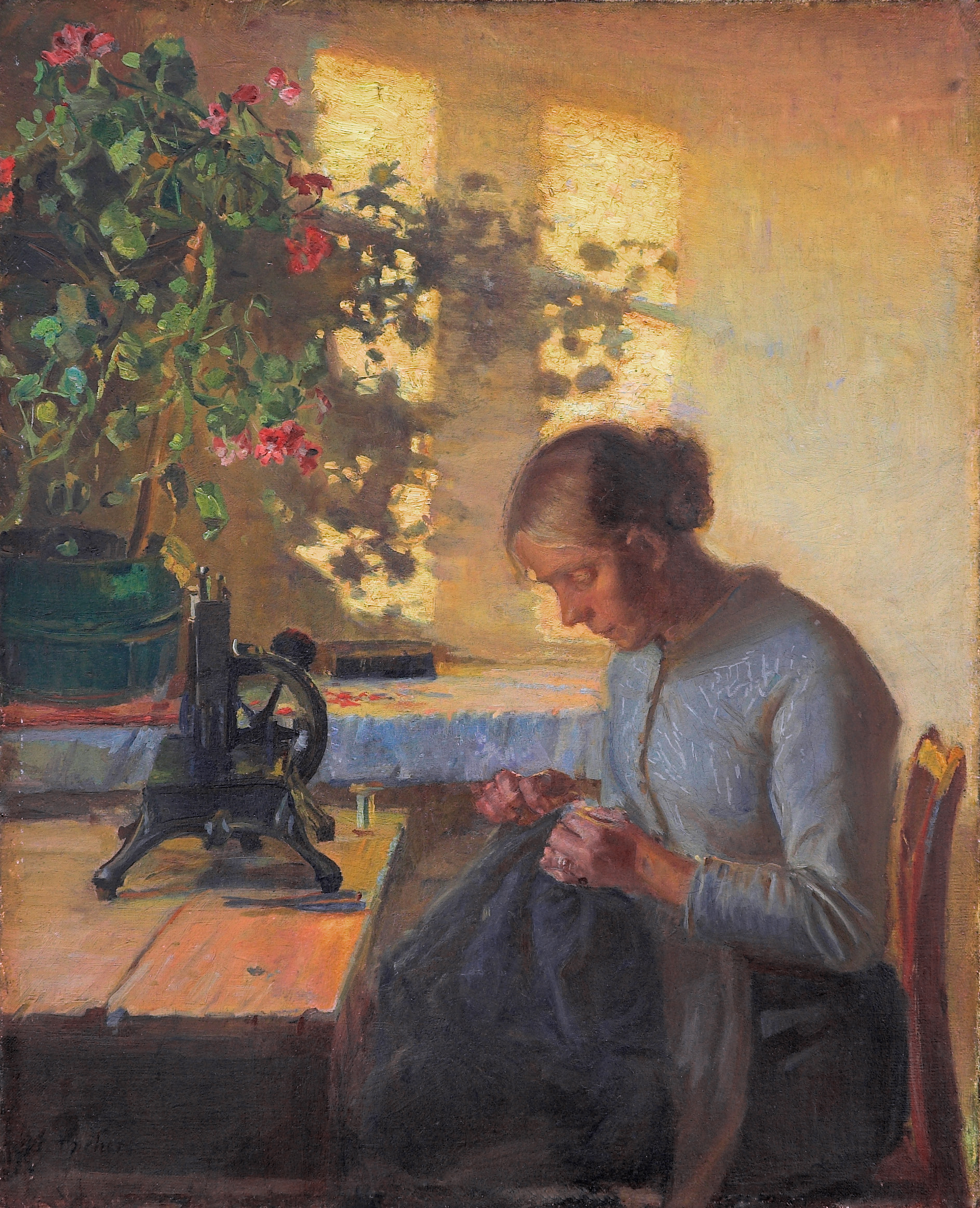
Fisherman's Wife Sewing, Anna Ancher, 1890

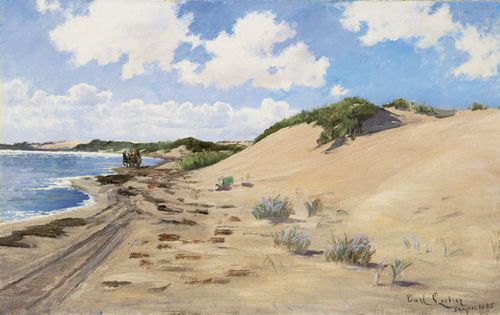
The Mail Coach, Carl Locher, c. 1890

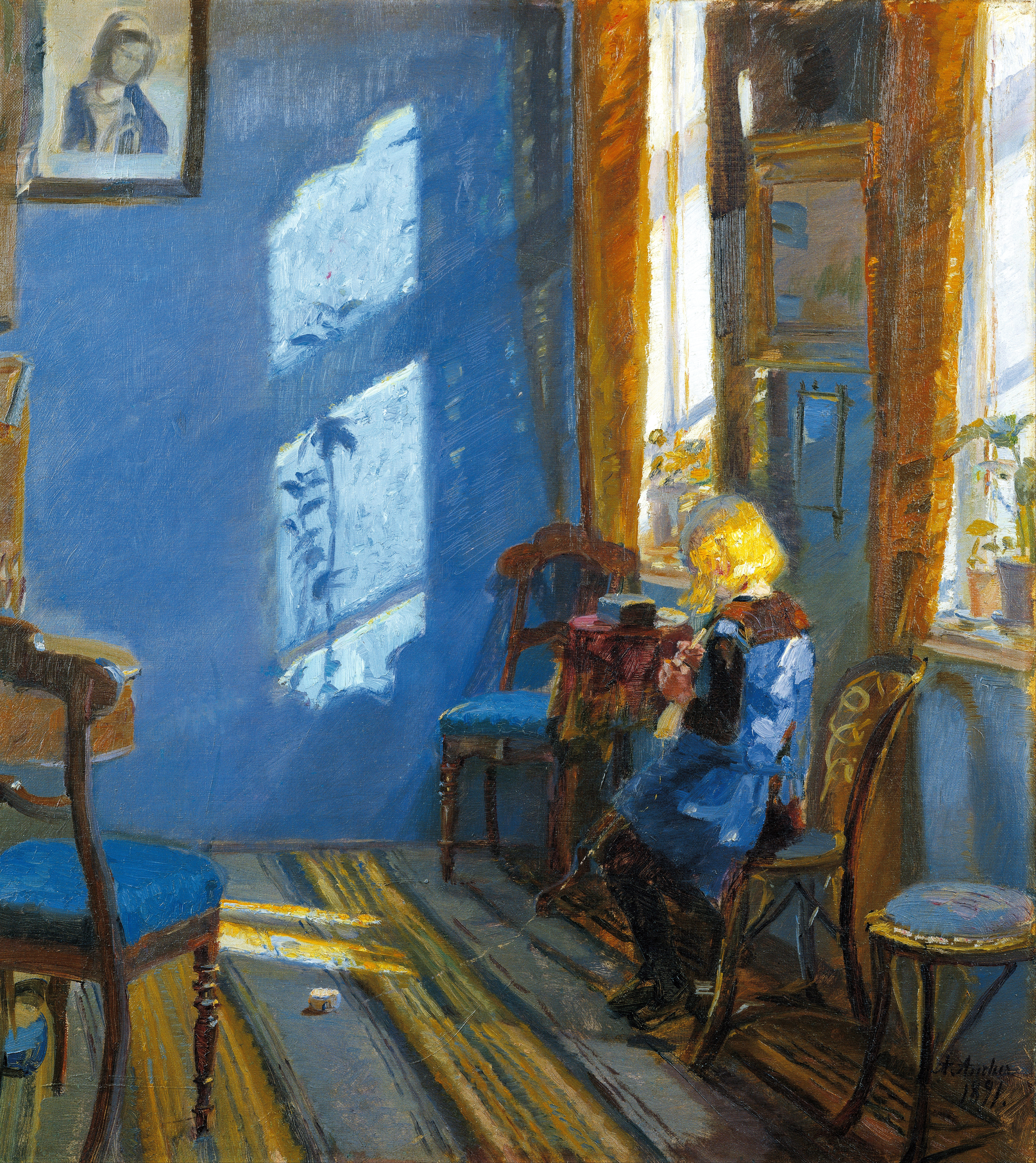
Sunlight in the Blue Room, Anna Ancher, 1891

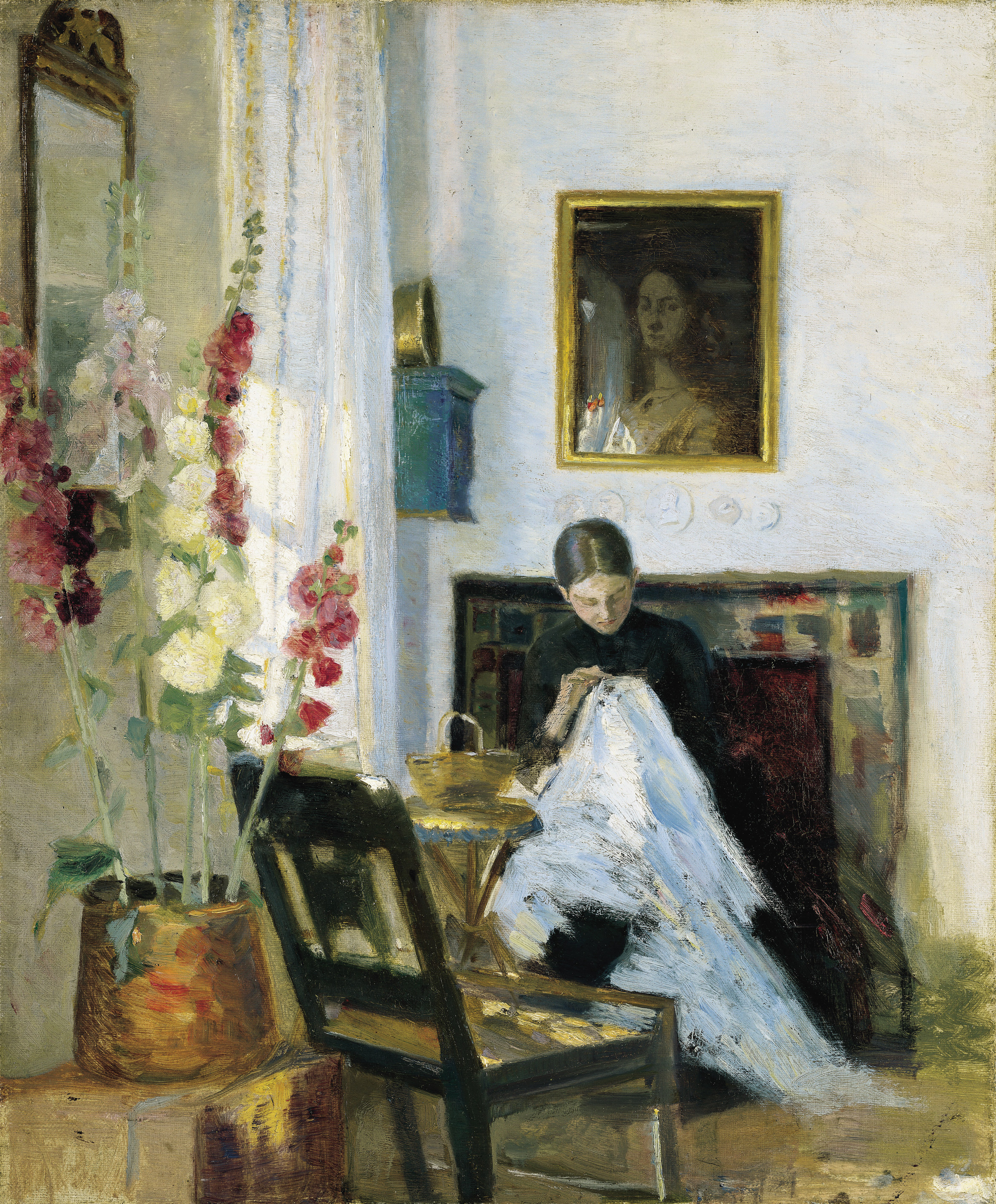
Interior with Girl Sewing, Marie Krøyer, undated

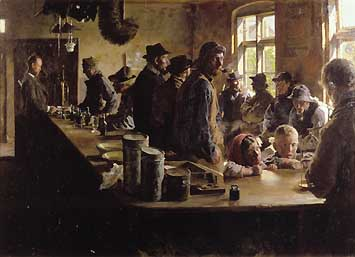
In the Grocer's Store When There is No Fishing, P.S. Krøyer, 1892

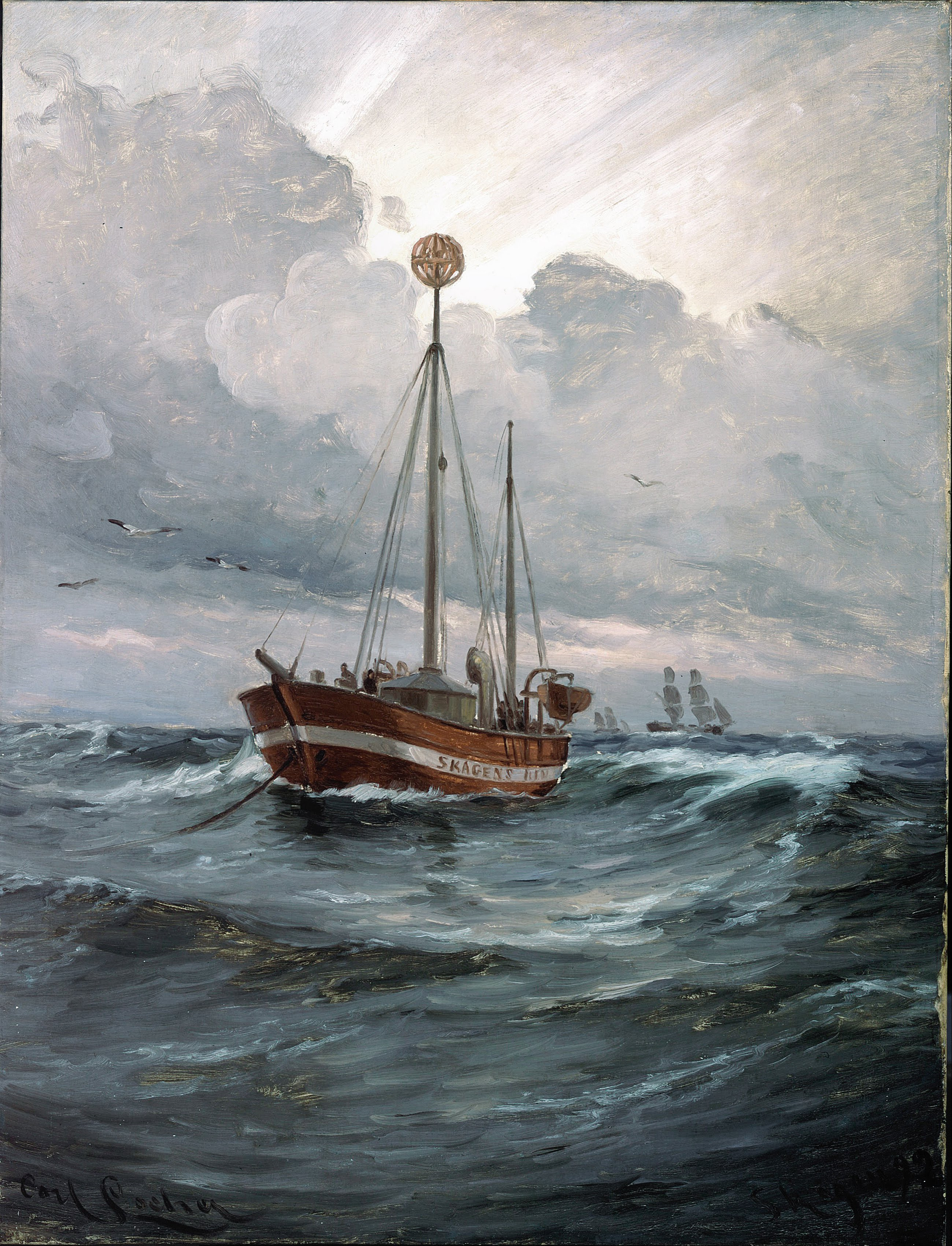
The Lightship at Skagen Reef, Carl Locher, 1892

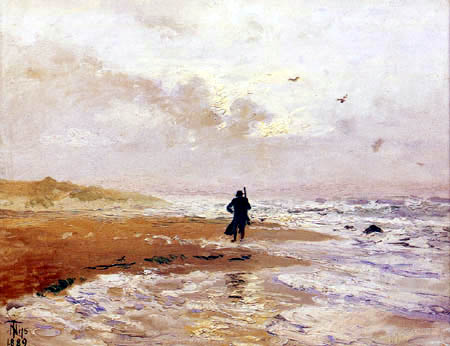
The Beach of Skagen, Thorvald Niss, c. 1889

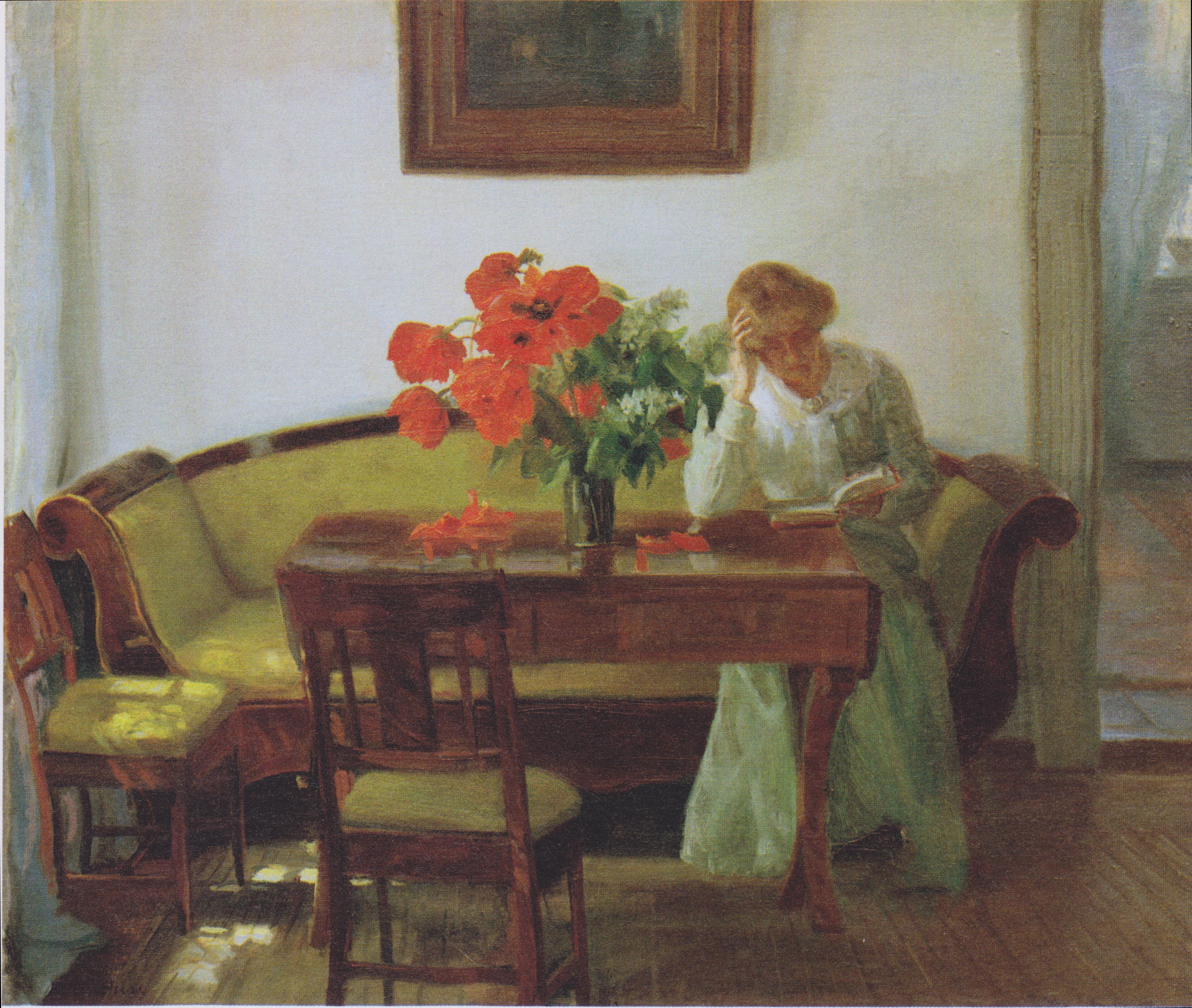
Interior with Poppies and Reading Woman (Lizzy Hohlenberg), Anna Ancher, 1905

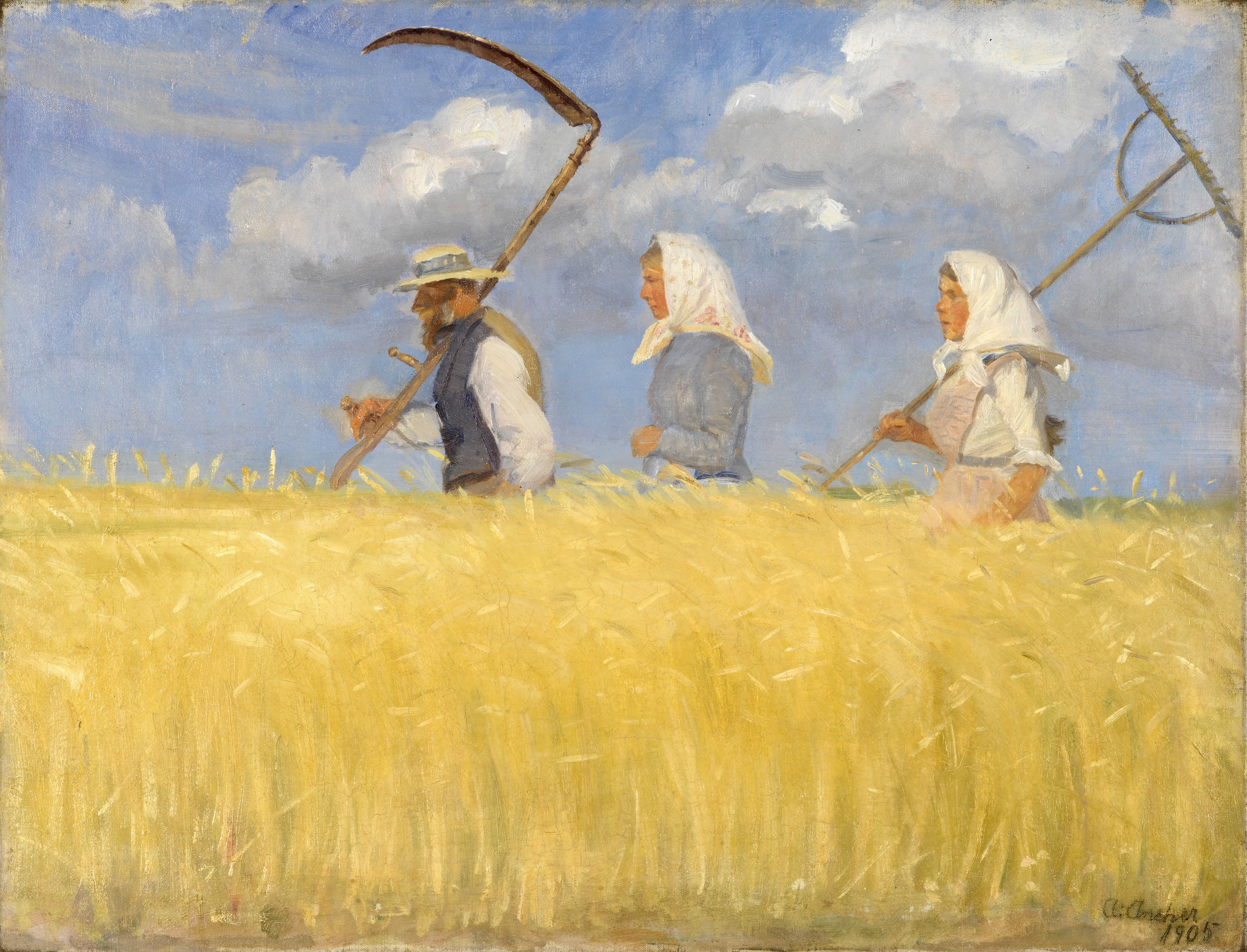
Harvesters, Anna Ancher, 1905

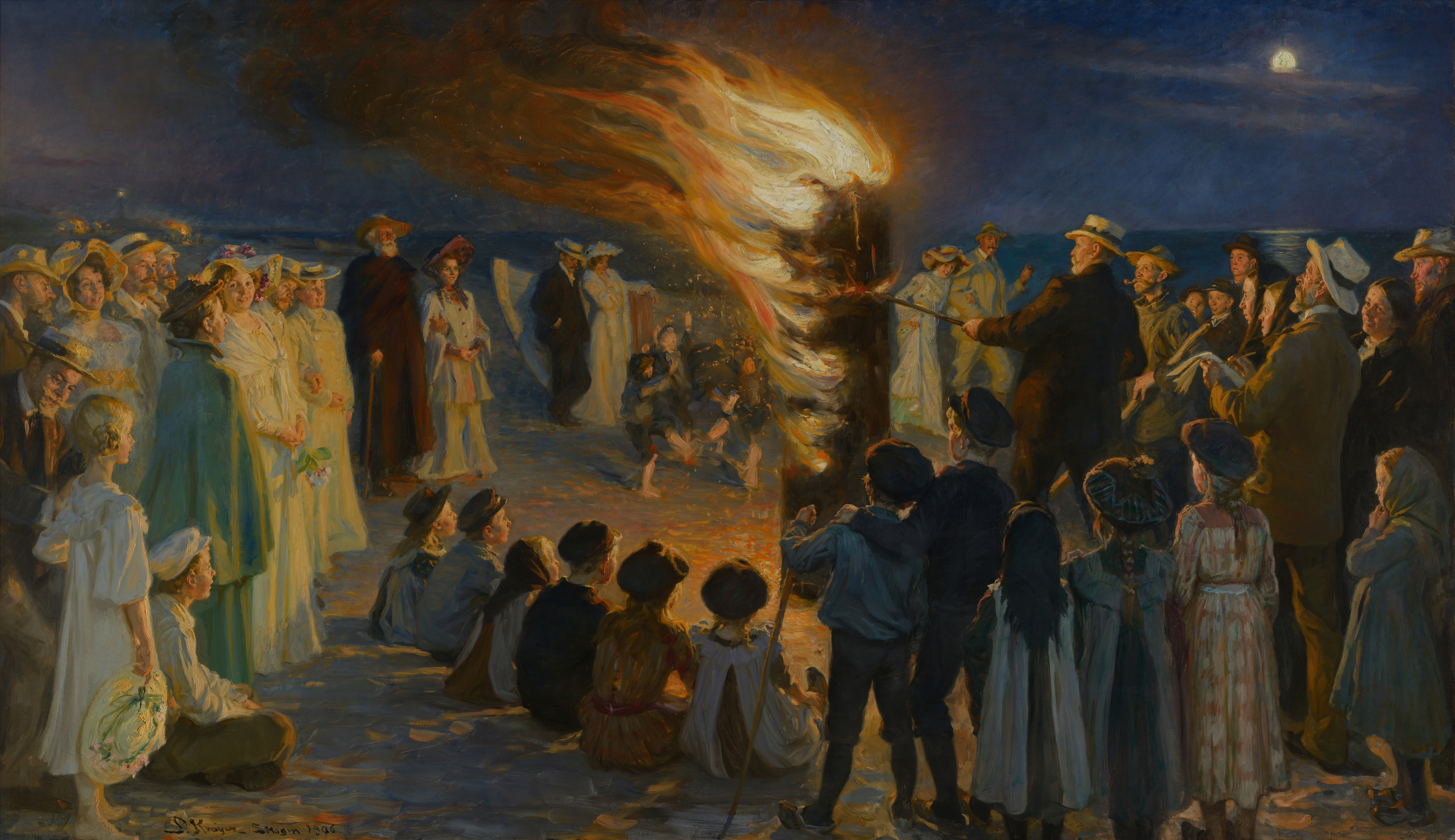
Midsummer Eve Bonfire on Skagen Beach, P.S. Krøyer, 1906

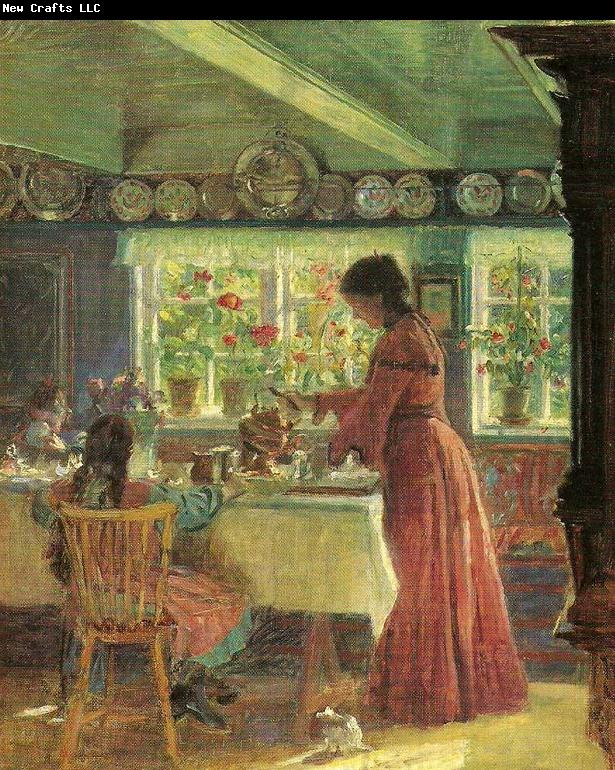
Pouring the Morning Coffee, Laurits Tuxen, 1906

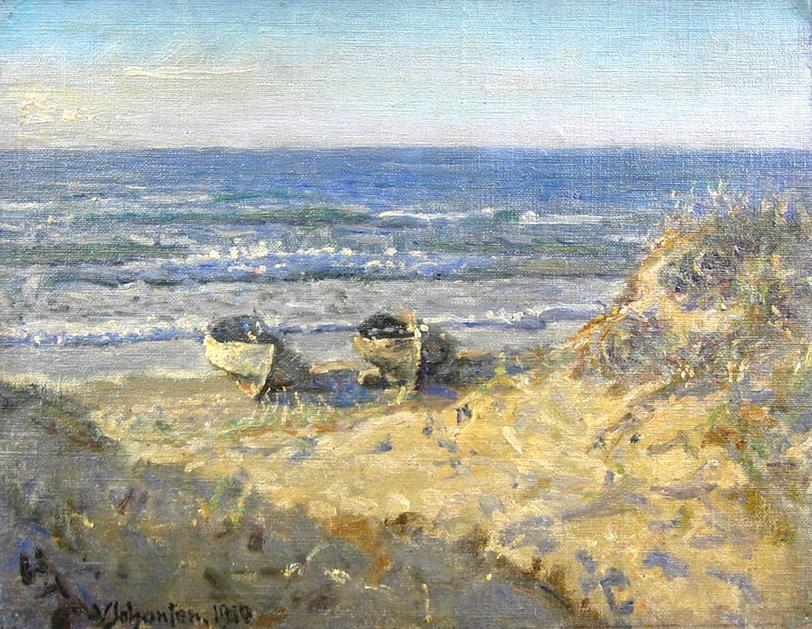
Boats on Sønderstrand in Skagen, Viggo Johansen, 1910

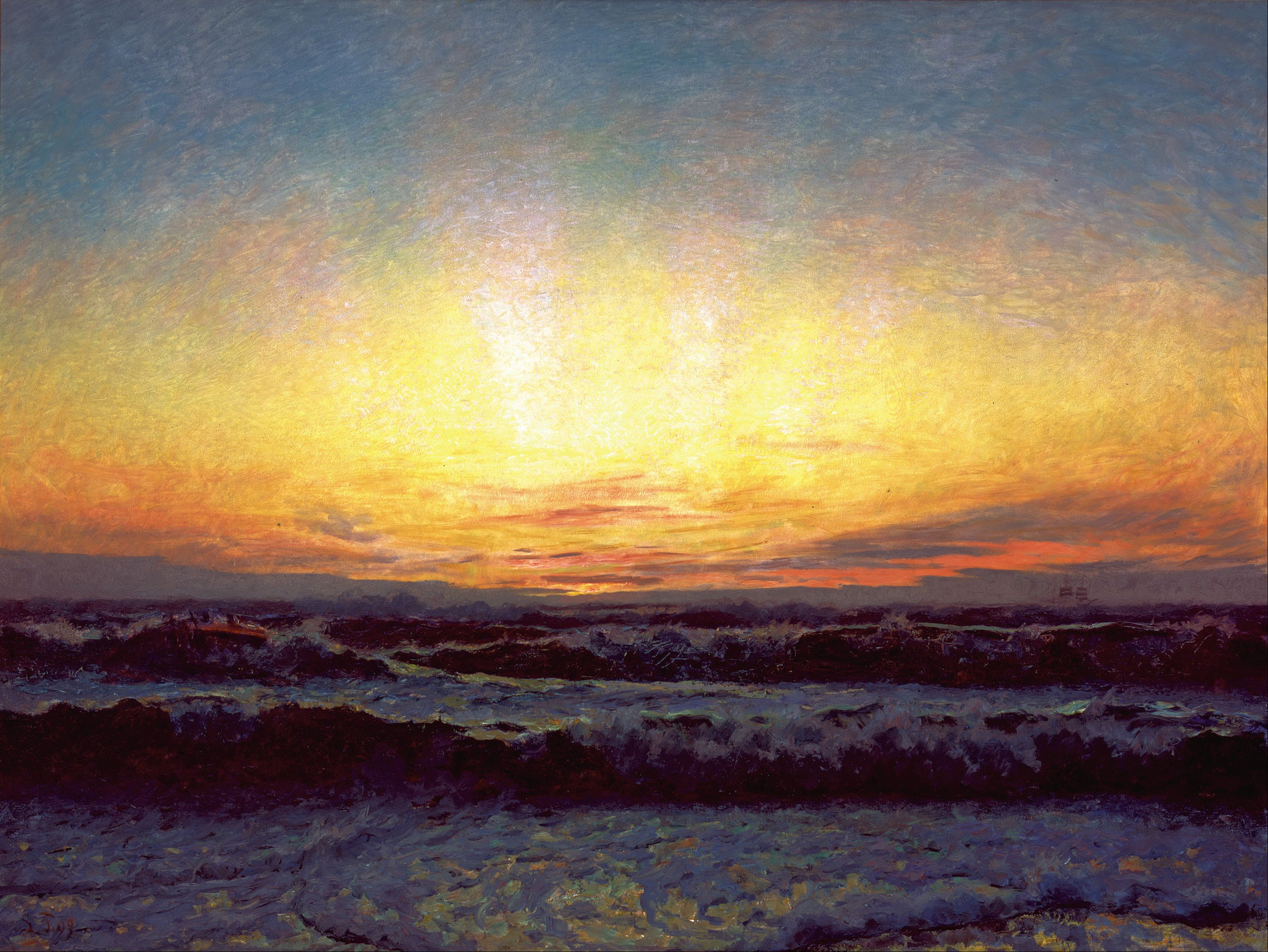
The North Sea in Stormy Weather, Laurits Tuxen, 1909

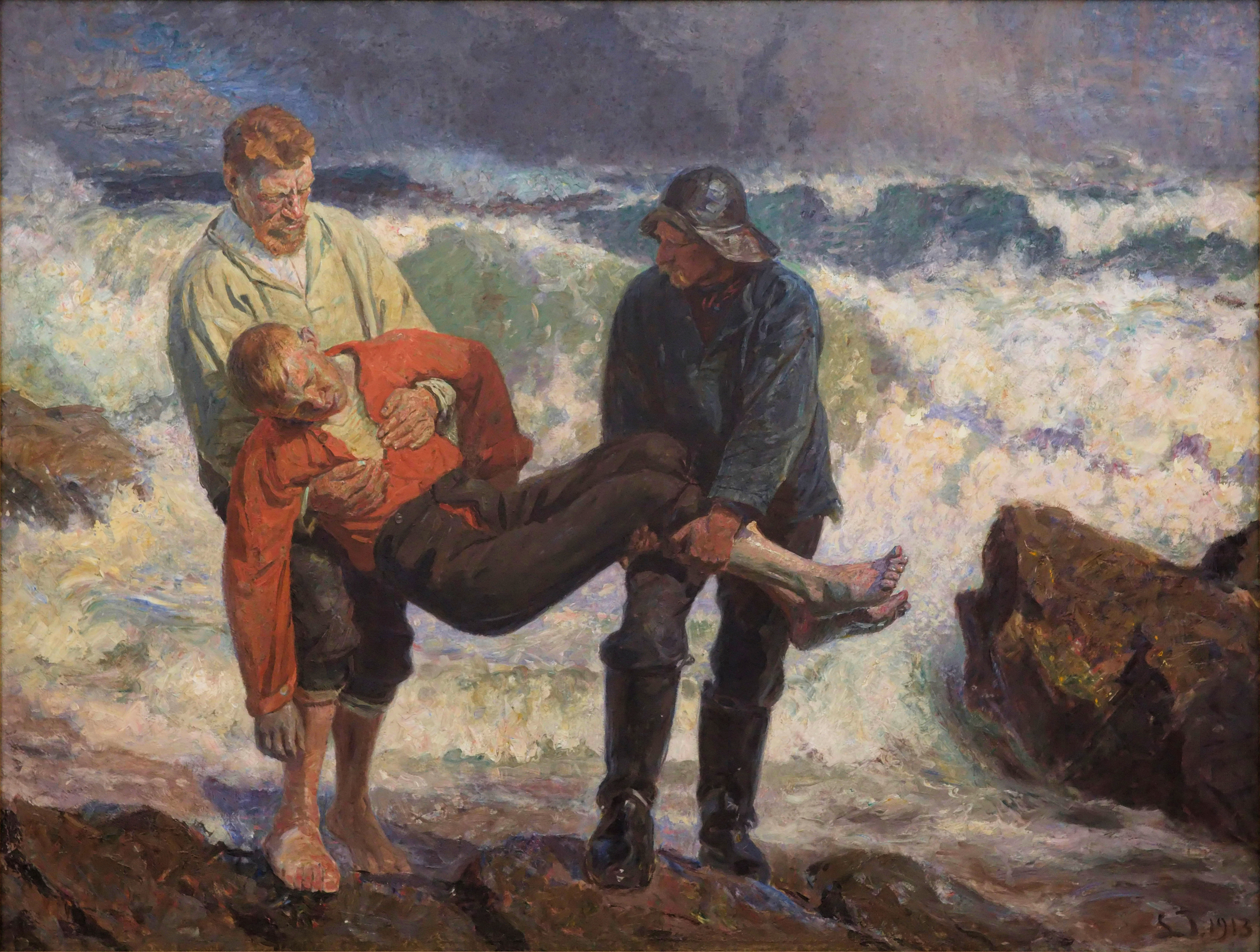
The Drowned Boy is Brought Ashore, Laurits Tuxen, 1913

== See also ==
- Art of Denmark
- Bornholm school of painters
- Funen Painters
- Odsherred Painters
- Artists' colony
