= Launching the Boat. Skagen =

1884 painting by Oscar Björck

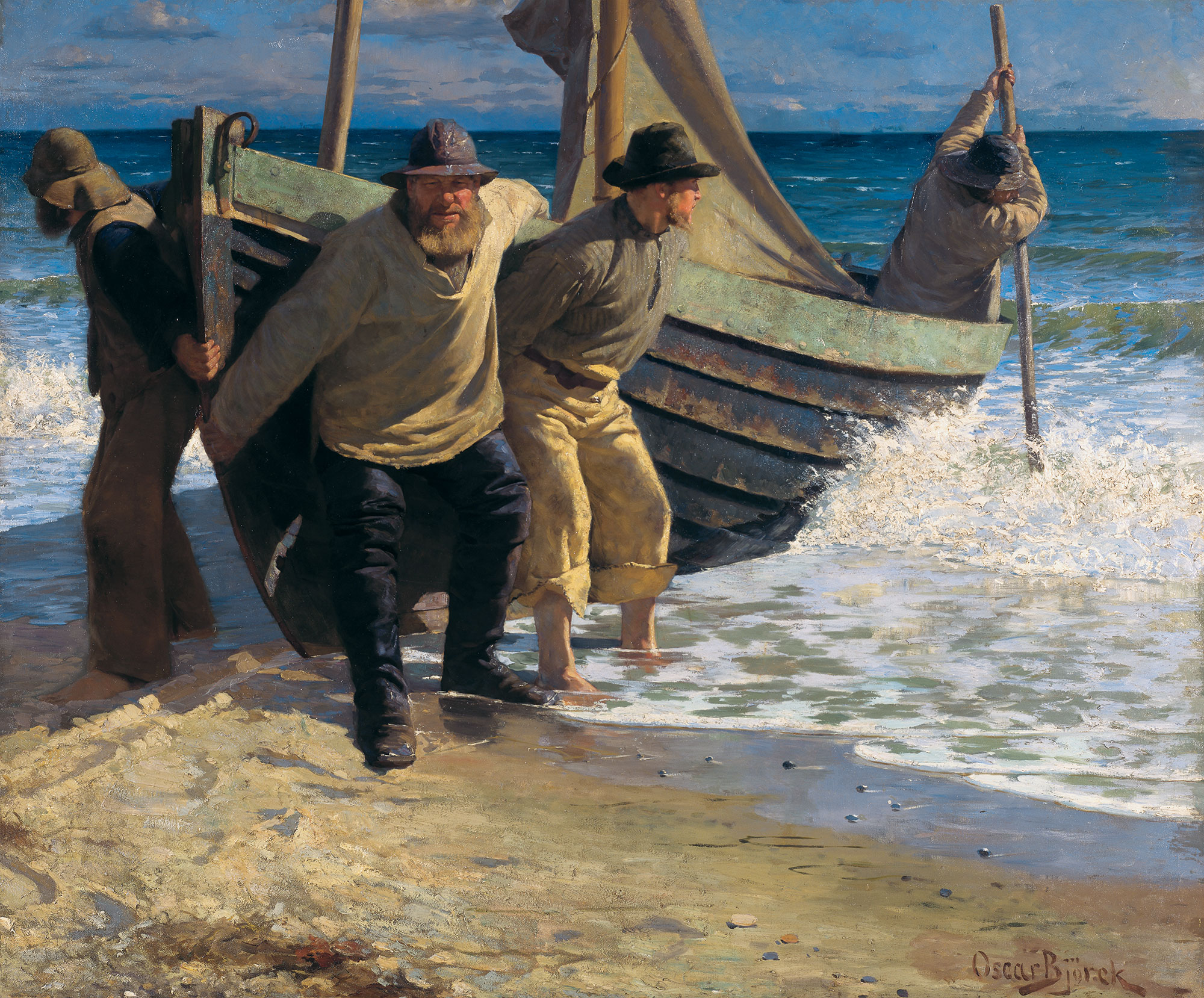
Oscar Bjørck: Launching the Boat. Skagen (1884)

Launching the Boat. Skagen (Danish: Båden sættes i søen. Skagen) is an 1884 painting by the Swedish artist Oscar Björck. It depicts the activities of the local fishermen, a favourite subject for the Skagen Painters. Launching the Boat is the largest of Björck's open-air paintings from Skagen. It is on display in Skagens Museum.

== Background ==
The Skagen Painters were a close-knit group of mainly Danish artists who gathered each summer from the late 1870s in the fishing village of Skagen in the far north of Jutland, painting the local fishermen and their own gatherings and celebrations. Oscar Björck first arrived in Skagen in 1882, encouraged by P. S. Krøyer whom he had met in Paris. He immediately became attached to the artists' community there, especially Michael Ancher, his wife Anna and Holger Drachmann. Björck spent several summers there, completing some of his best paintings under the influence of Krøyer and the French Naturalism movement.

== Painting description ==
Measuring 160 by 194.5 centimetres (63.0 in × 76.6 in), Launching the Boat is the largest of Björck's open-air paintings from Skagen. It presents the everyday work of the local fishermen. In contrast to Ancher's Will He Round the Point?, there is no sense of alarm or danger in his painting. The thick layers of paint on the canvas help to convey the foaming surf and the coarseness of the sand. The fisherman at the front of the boat is Ole Svendsen who can also be seen in many of Ancher's paintings of the Skagen fishermen. The painting is in the collection at Skagens Museum.
