= Oscar Björck =

Swedish painter

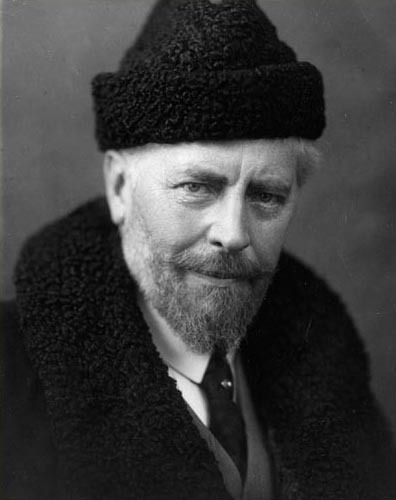
Oscar Björck

Oscar Gustaf Björck (15 January 1860 – 5 December 1929) was a Swedish painter and a professor at the Royal Swedish Academy of Arts.

== Biography ==
Born in Stockholm, from 1877 to 1882, Björck was a student of Edvard Perséus at the Academy where his paintings included Loke fängslas af asarne (Loki imprisoned by Æsir) (1880), Gustaf Vasa inför kung Hans (Gustaf Vasa before King Hans) (1881) and Den förlorade sonens återkomst (Return of the prodigal son) (1882) which was awarded the Royal Medal. In 1883, Björck was awarded a travel scholarship. He spent the winter of 1883–84 in Paris. The following winter, he went to Munich where he painted a few portraits, including a full-length painting of his wife. In the spring of 1885, he moved to Venice and, in the autumn, to Rome where he painted the large portrait of Susanna (Gothenburg Museum of Art) and Romerska smeder (Roman blacksmiths) (Washington National Gallery of Art, Washington). In 1887, he completed a number of paintings including the Veneziansk saluhall (Venetian hall) (Nationalmuseum of Sweden), and Lördagsmässa i Markuskyrkan (Saturday Mass in St. Mark's Church).

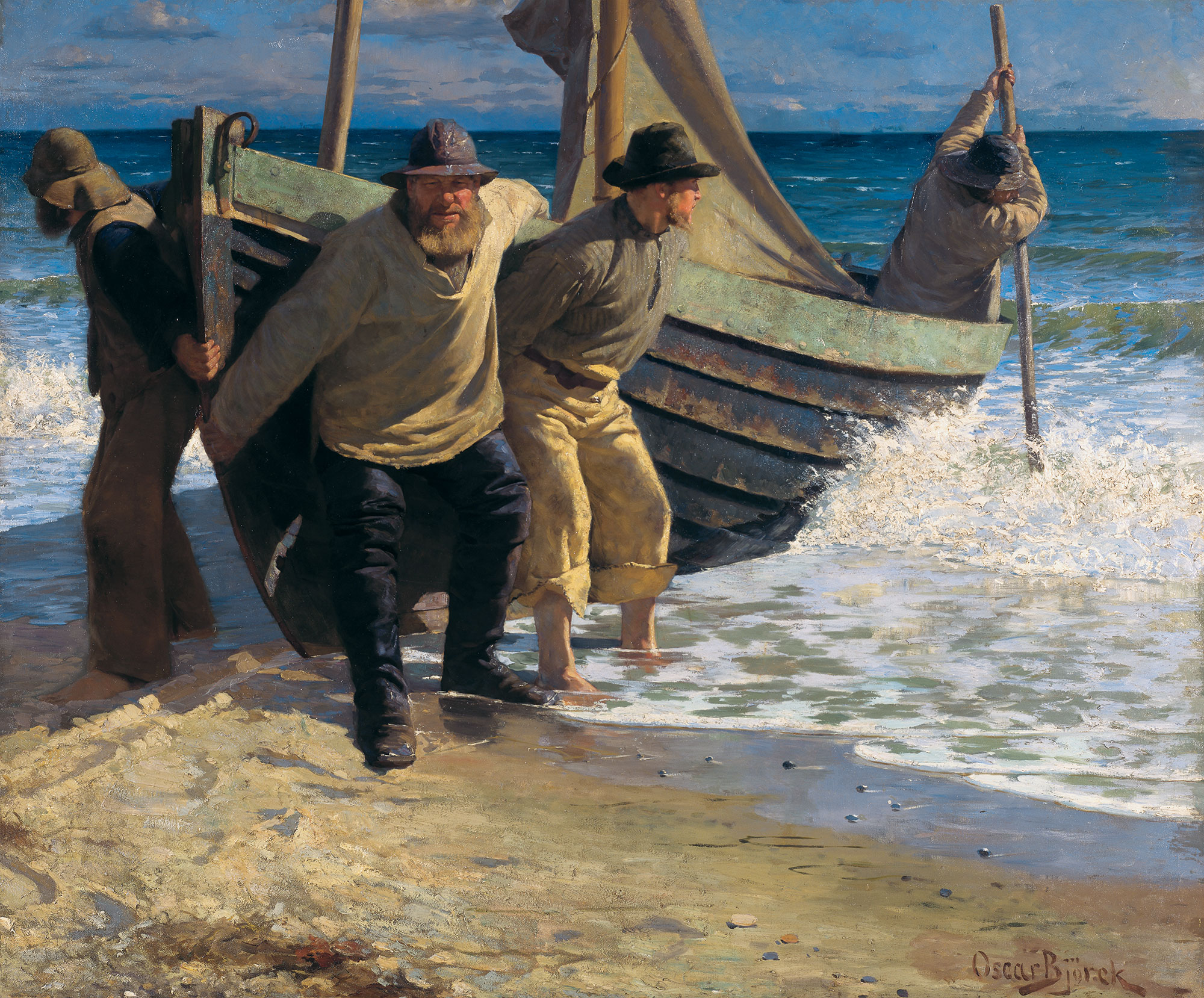
Oscar Björck, Launching the Boat. Skagen (1884)

After summer stays at Skagen in Denmark in 1882, 1883 and 1884, he finally settled in Stockholm in 1888 where he concentrated on portraits. These include several of King Oscar (among them one at Skokloster Castle, a full-length at Drottningholm Palace, one with crown and mantle in Stockholm Palace, and one which was acquired by the German emperor. He also painted Prins Eugen vid staffliet (Prince Eugen at the easel) (Nationamuseum, 1895); Crown Prince Gustaf (Stockholm Palace, 1900), The Artist's Wife (full-length, 1891, Gothenburg Museum) and Baron Johan Nordenfalk den yngre (Royal Academy, 1892). In addition, he completed a few landscapes, a couple of genres and various decorative paintings.

From 1889, he was a member of the Academy and its teaching staff and in 1898, he became a professor. Björck was Commissar for Art at the Stockholm Exposition in 1897, for the Baltic Exhibition in 1914 and for the Swedish exhibition in London in 1924.

Björck's earliest portraits were influenced by Georg von Rosen and his pictures from Skagen reflected the influence of Danish artists, especially Peder Severin Krøyer. In many of his characteristic works, he depicted the Swedish middle class of his times.

== Summers in Skagen ==
Björck was encouraged to go to Skagen in 1882 by P.S. Krøyer whom he had met in Paris and for whom he showed great admiration. He immediately became attached to the artists' community there, especially Michael Ancher, his wife Anna and Holger Drachmann. It was not just the Skagen landscape that attracted him but equally the warmth and hospitality of the artists themselves. Björck spent several summers there, completing some of his best paintings under the influence of Krøyer and the French Naturalism movement.

Oscar Björck (with a hat) can be seen drinking champagne in Krøyer's famous painting Hip, Hip, Hurrah! (1888) which shows several of the Skagen Painters celebrating in the Anchers' garden.

== Gallery ==
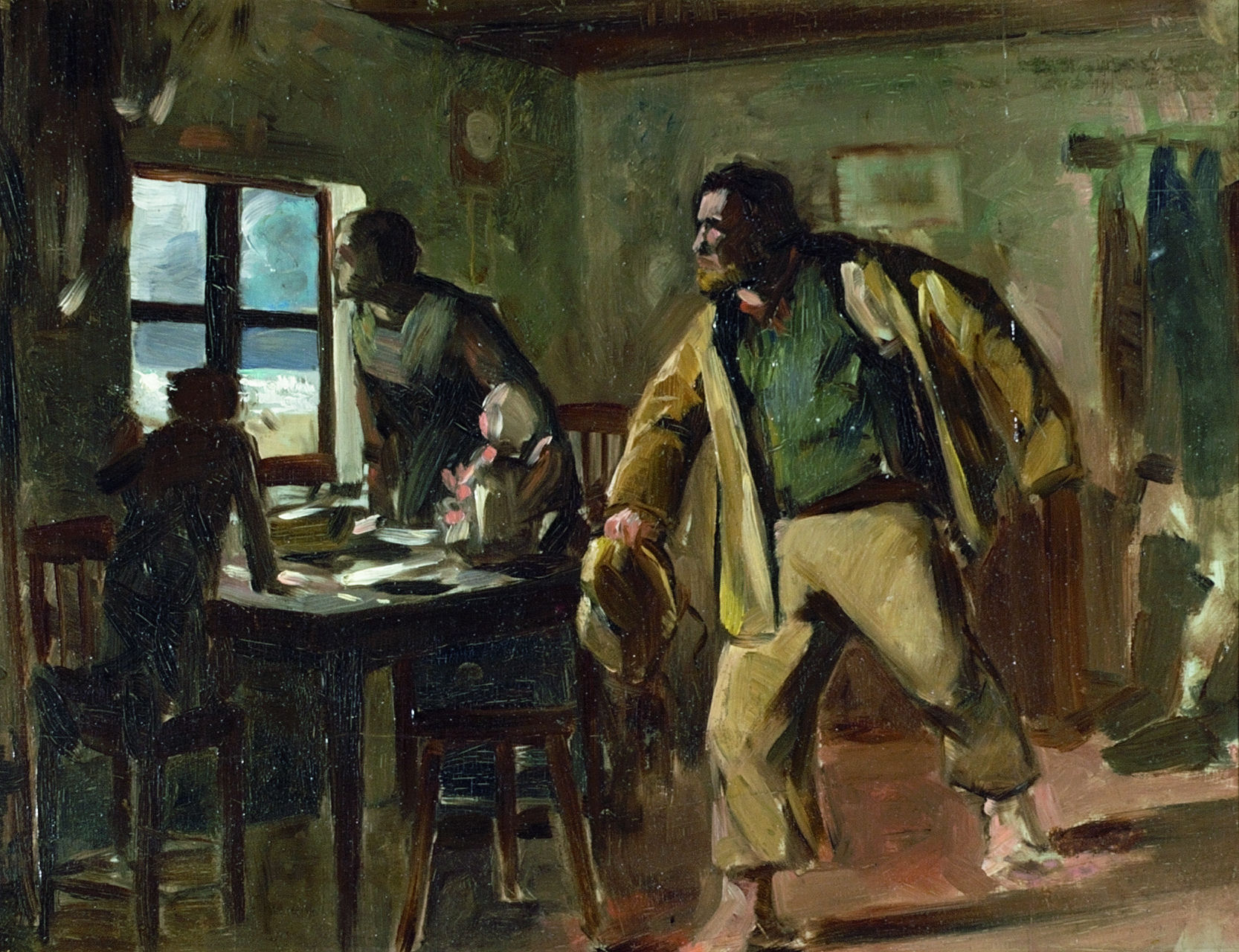
Signal of Distress (1883)

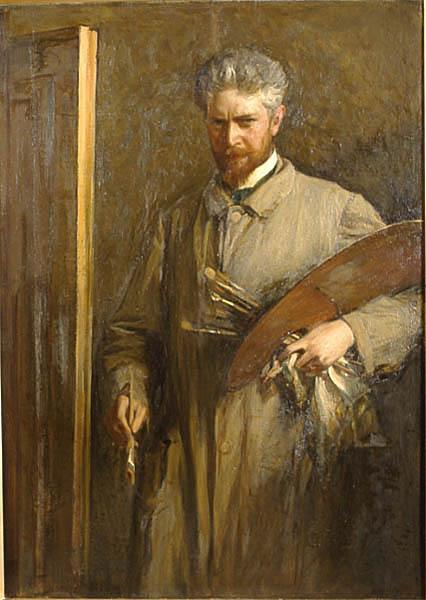
Self portrait (1903)

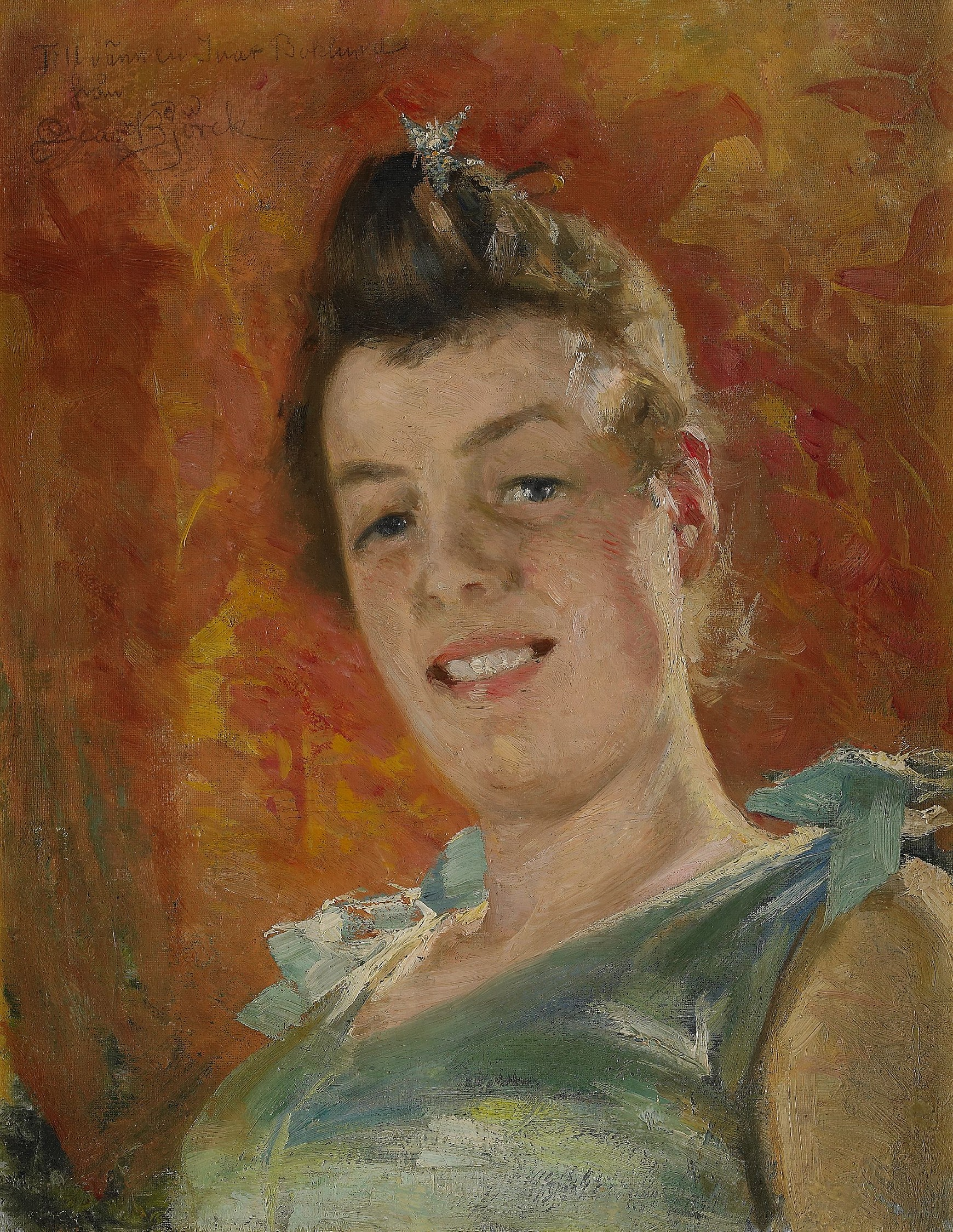
Portrait of a Woman

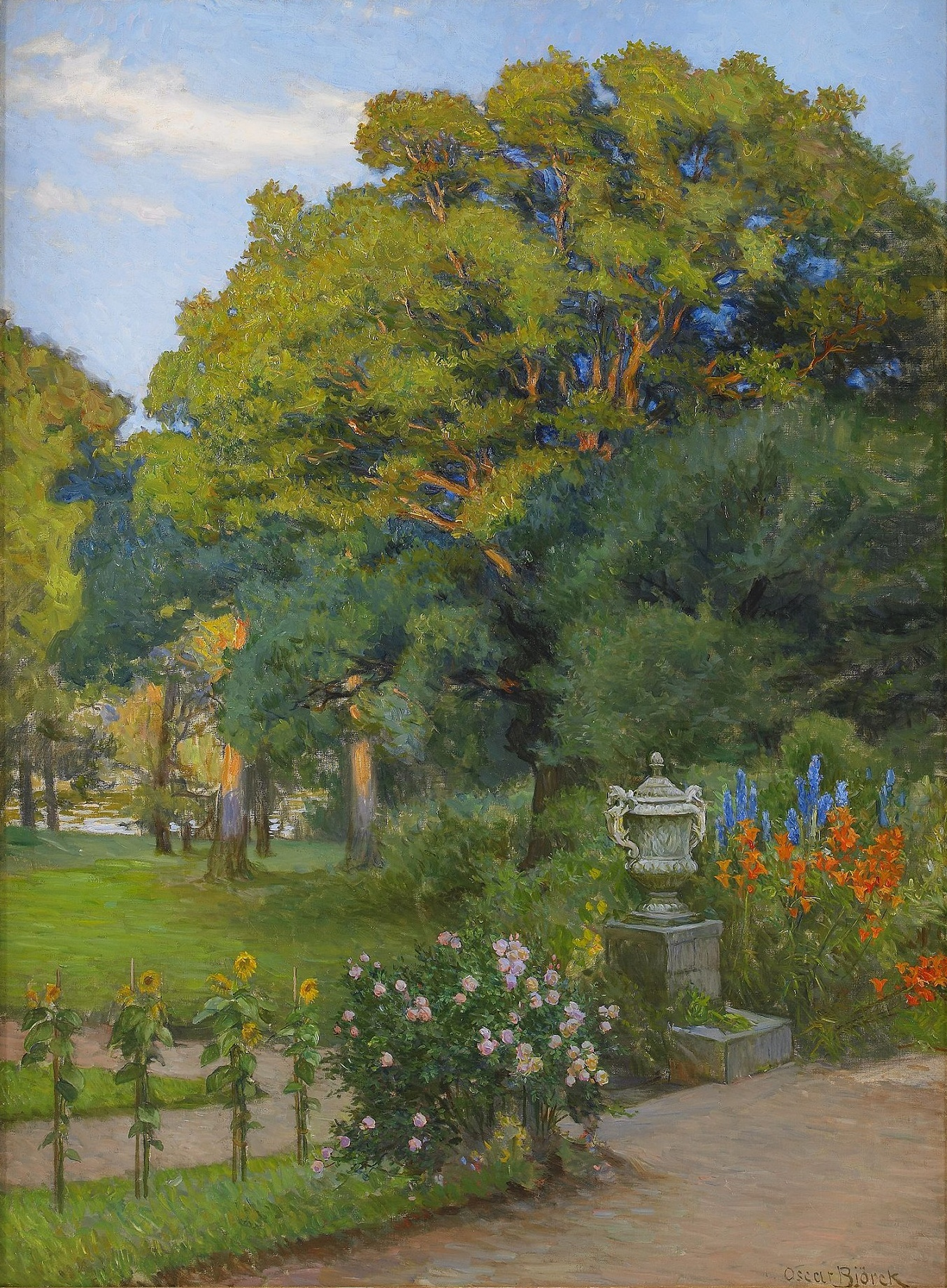
Park landscape

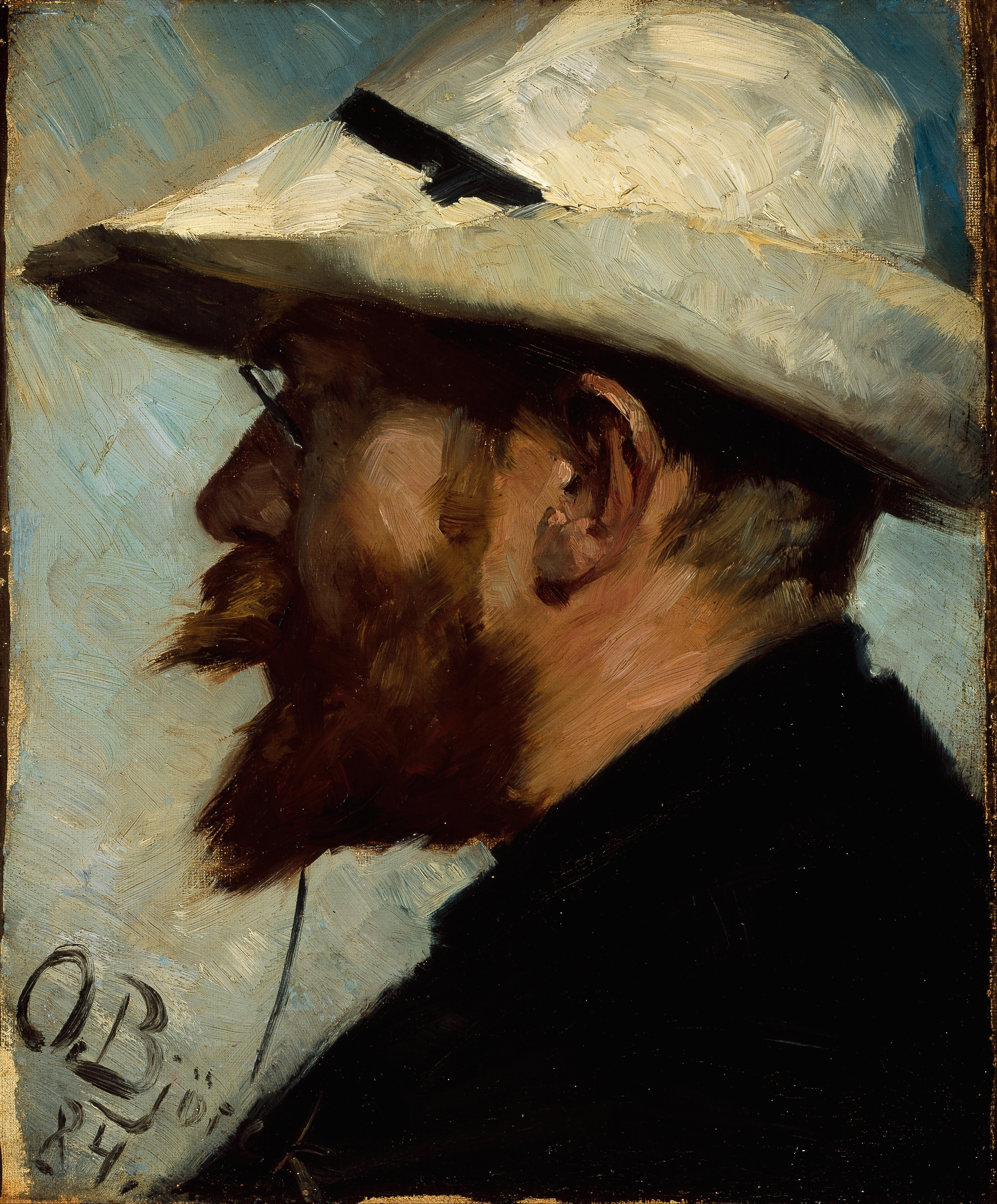
Portrait of P.S. Krøyer

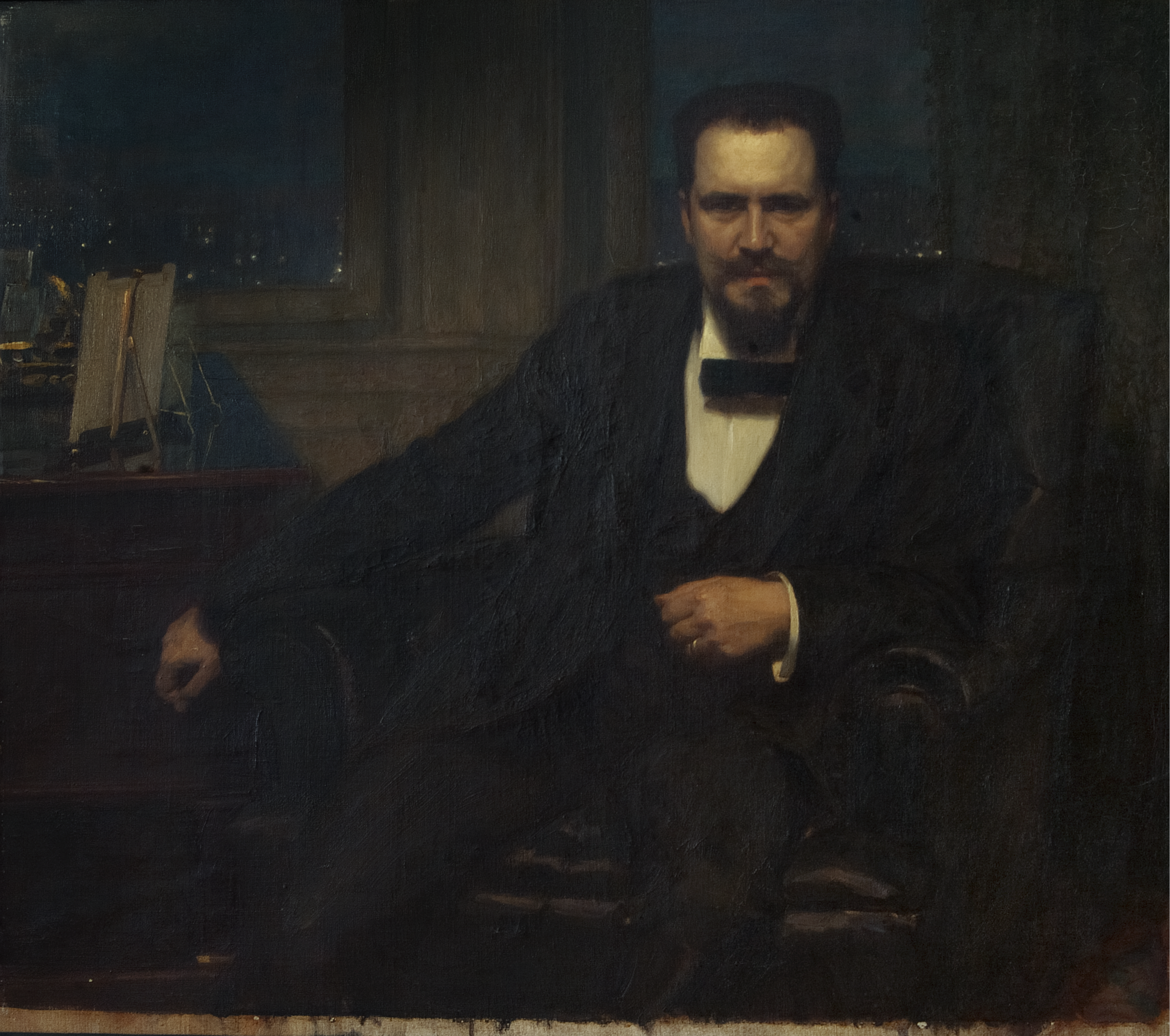
Portrait of Ernest Thiel, 1900, Thiel Gallery

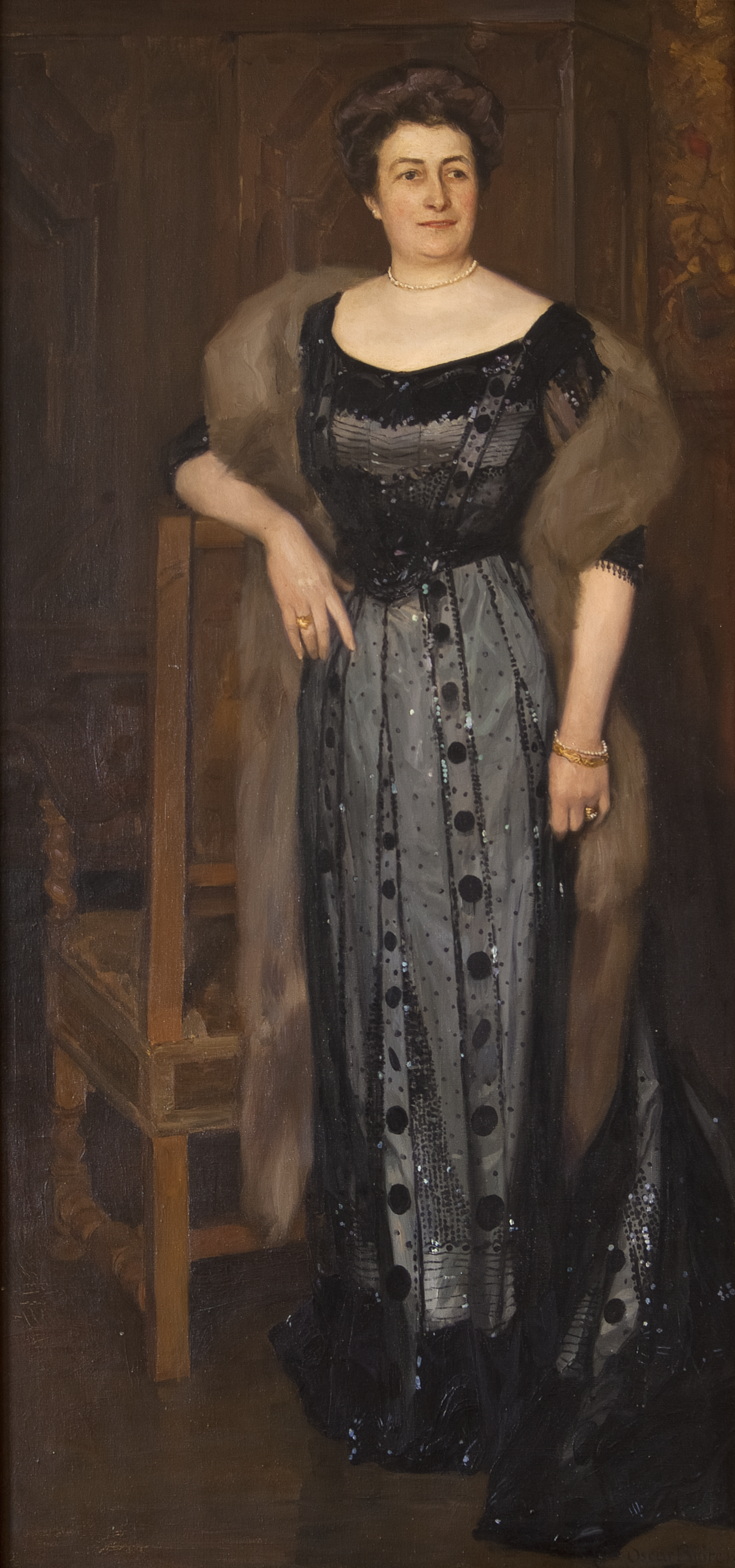
Portrait of Alice Sachs, 1909, Thiel Gallery

== See also ==
- Launching the Boat. Skagen, 1884 painting
