= Portrait of My Wife, the Painter Anna Ancher =

1884 painting by Michael Ancher

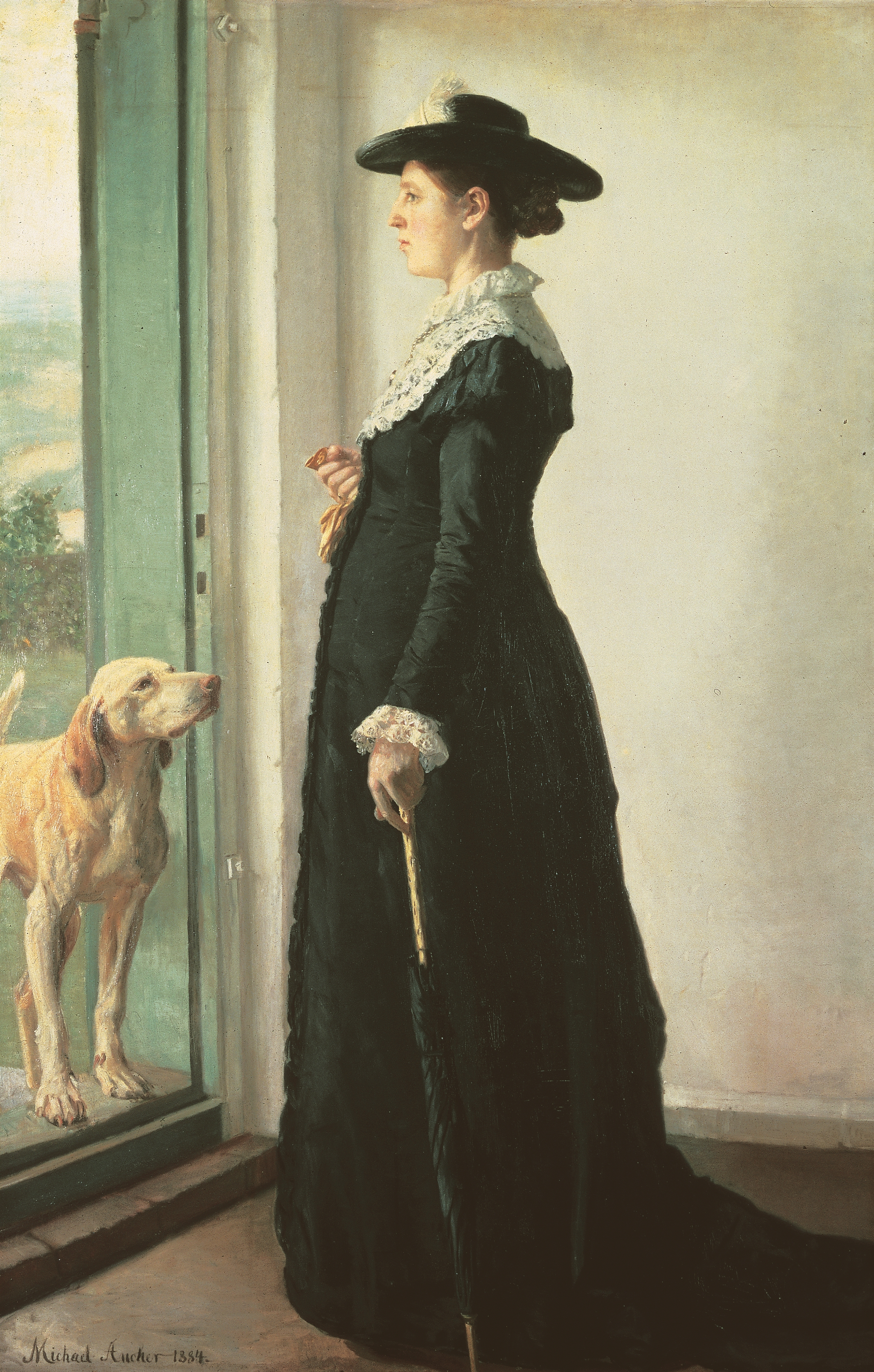
Portrait of My Wife, the Painter Anna Archer (1884) by Michael Ancher

Portrait of My Wife, the Painter Anna Archer is an 1884 painting by Michael Ancher, now in the Hirschsprung Collection.

She is shown looking through an open door, with a wedding ring on her right hand and her husband's dog looking at Anna's pregnancy bump - the study for the work was painted in summer 1883 and she gave birth to their daughter Helga that August. One of P.S. Krøyer's first pastel drawings of painters at work (which became a major feature of his oeuvre) was Michael Ancher Painting the Portrait of Anna, Standing at the Door, showing Ancher producing the final version of Portrait. It was exhibited in Copenhagen in 1884, with the depiction of pregnancy causing some controversy, though the theme of the artist's wife soon became popular among other Danish painters.

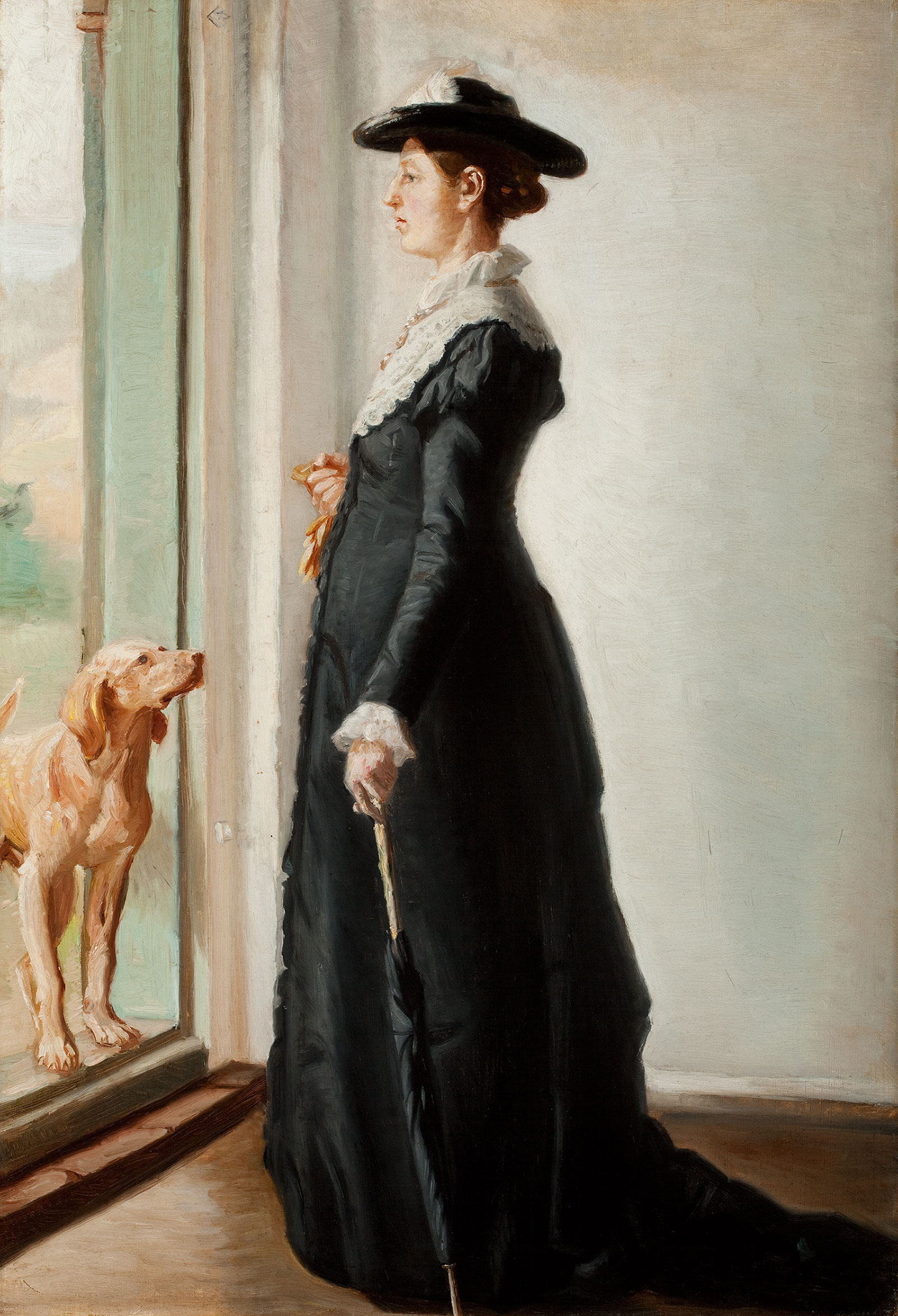
The 1883 study for the work (Michael og Anna Anchers Hus

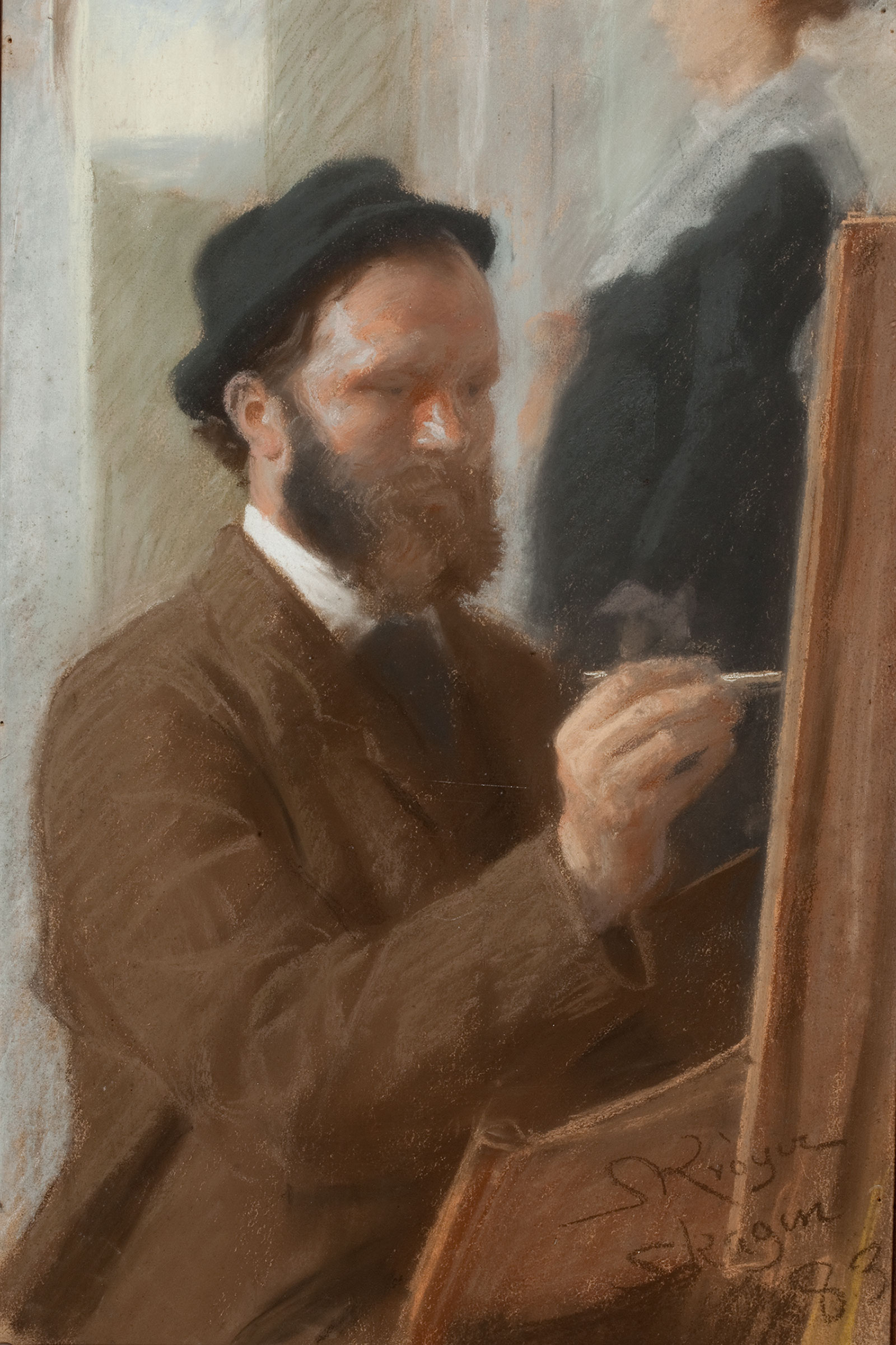
Krøyer's Michael Ancher Painting the Portrait of Anna, Standing at the Door (Anchers Hus)

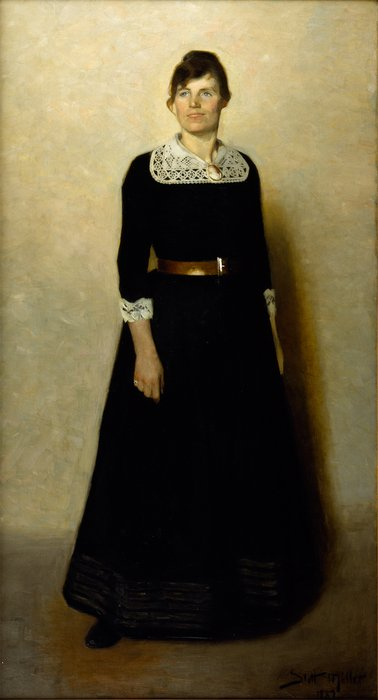
Harald Slott-Møller, My Wife, 1887, Fuglsang Kunstmuseum

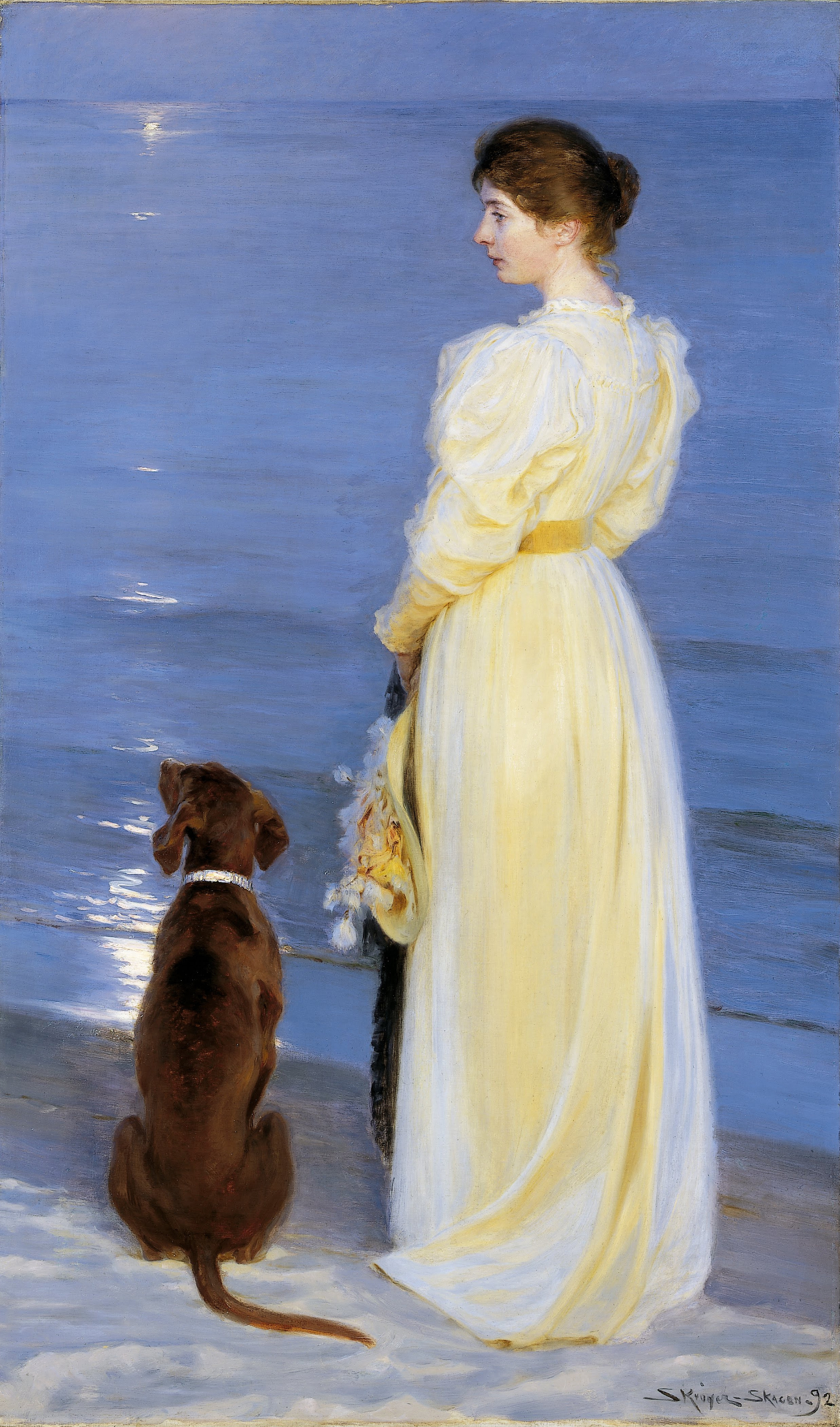
P.S. Krøyer, Summer Evening at Skagen. The Artist's Wife on the Beach with a Dog, 1892, Skagens Museum

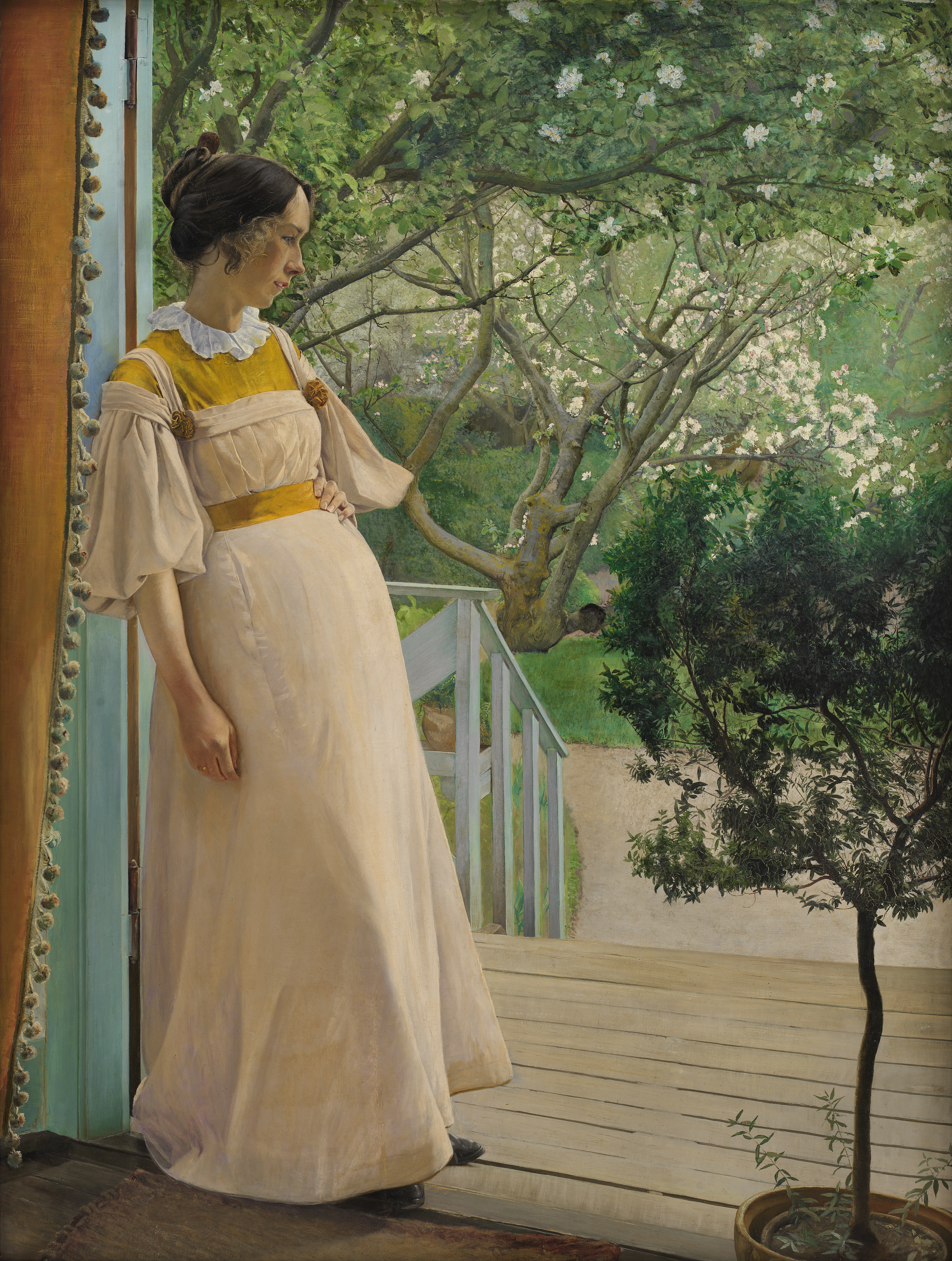
L.A. Ring, At the Garden Door. The Artist's Wife, 1897, Statens Museum for Kunst
