= Will He Round the Point? =

1880 oil-on-canvas painting by Michael Ancher

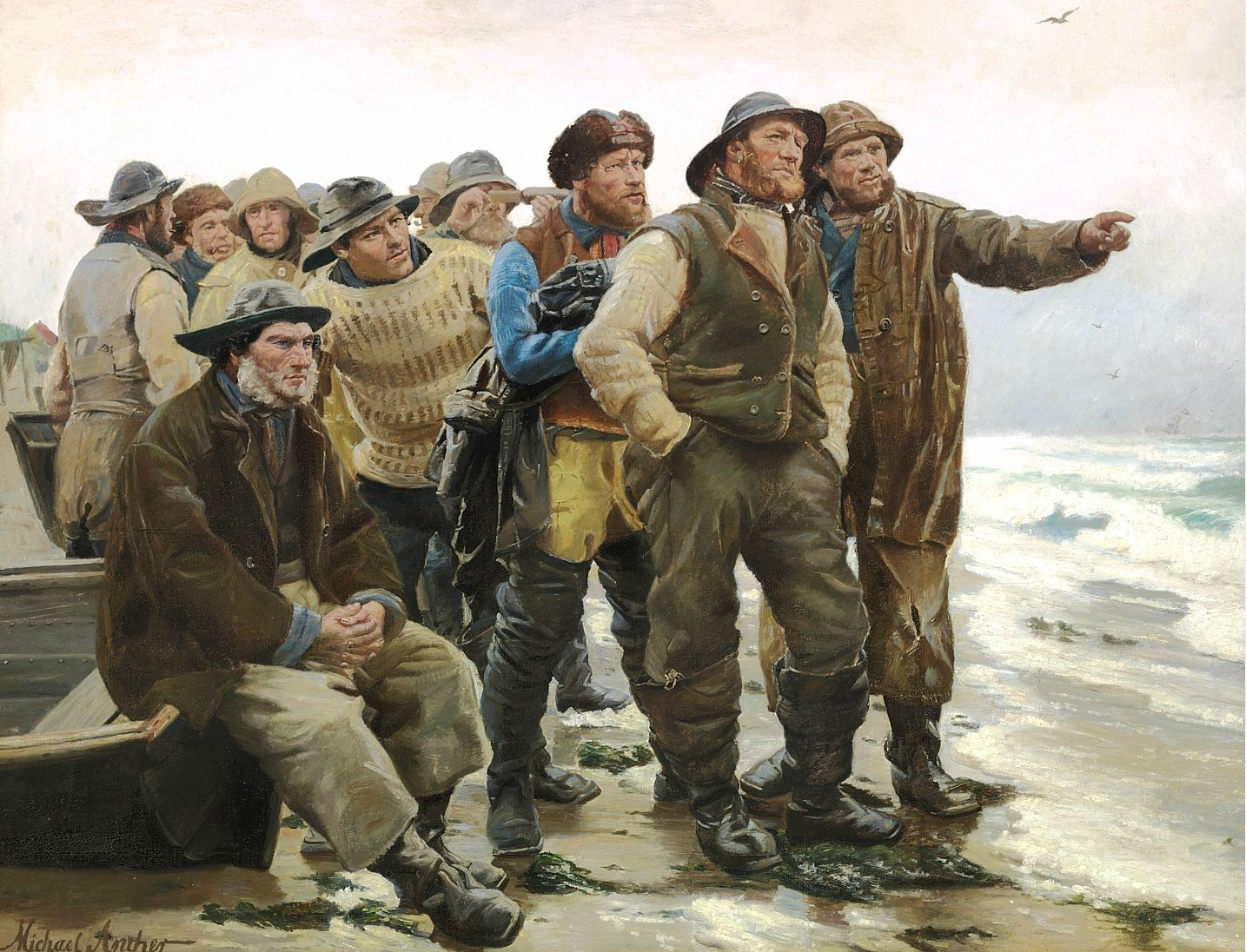
Michael Ancher: Will He Round the Point? (1880)

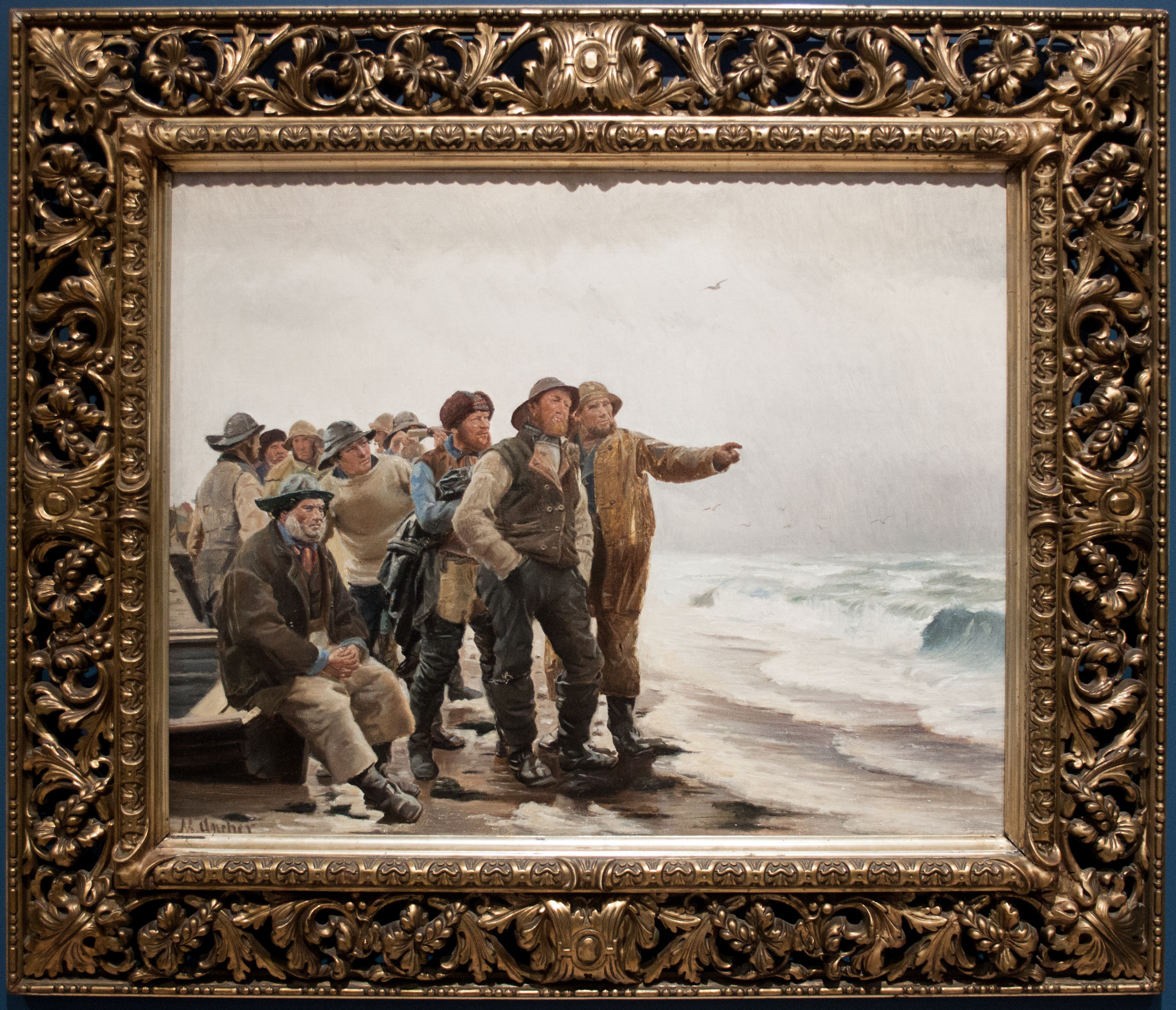
The painting on the wall of the Skagens Museum, with frame

Will He Round the Point? (Danish: Vil han klare pynten?) is an 1880 oil-on-canvas painting by Michael Ancher, a Danish painter associated with the Skagen Painters. The painting is particularly notable as Ancher sold it to Christian IX of Denmark, bringing Skagen and its artistic community to wider attention.

== Background ==
The Skagen Painters were a close-knit group of mainly Danish artists who gathered each summer from the late 1870s in the fishing village of Skagen in the far north of Jutland, painting the local fishermen and their own gatherings and celebrations. Michael Ancher, who arrived in Skagen in 1874, immediately became attached to the village and its heroic fishermen. In 1880, he married Anna Brøndum, the daughter of the innkeeper, and settled there.

== Painting description ==
Ancher's interest in Will He Round the Point? can be seen in a sketch he included in a letter to his fiancée Anna in July 1879. It was followed by further sketches, including oils of the group and the individual fishermen. He completed his large version (63.5 x 79.5 cm) in 1879 and submitted it to the Charlottenborg Spring Exhibition in 1880. The painting was responsible for Ancher's rise to fame after three notable buyers all expressed an interest in purchasing it; the Copenhagen Art Association (Kunstforeningen i København) withdrew its initial offer when Statens Museum for Kunst (the National Gallery of Denmark) expressed an interest, but it too was obliged to stand aside when King Christian IX decided he wished to add the painting to his private collection. The king was not particularly interested in art but was no doubt influenced by his wife Louise who had studied drawing as a child and was later instructed by Danish painters including Wilhelm Marstrand. On royal acquisition, the painting was hung in the private dining room at Amalienborg Palace in Copenhagen. Instead of a medal, Ancher received a grant which provided him with sufficient means to marry Anna. The wedding was celebrated in Skagen on 18 August 1880.

The title was probably inspired by Holger Drachmann's short story Vil han naa om pynten? (Will he get round the point?) written in 1875, but from earlier sketches it is known that Ancher depicted the fishermen on Skagen's South Beach contemplating the rough sea, and facing south, where there is no point. Like most observers, in her Northern Light, Lise Svanholm assumes the fishermen are shown looking north towards Grenen, the tip of the Skagen Odde peninsula where ships were frequently stranded. As in many of Ancher's pictures of fishermen, the work includes figures pointing or indicating alarm, urging the observer to imagine what is attracting their attention. The painting is just one of Ancher's many large paintings of Skagen's fishermen, the last being The Drowned Man painted in 1896 which pays tribute to the heroic Lars Kruse who drowned in 1894. The original painting is still in the royal collection. There are three known versions, one of which is in Skagens Museum.
