= Lars Kruse =

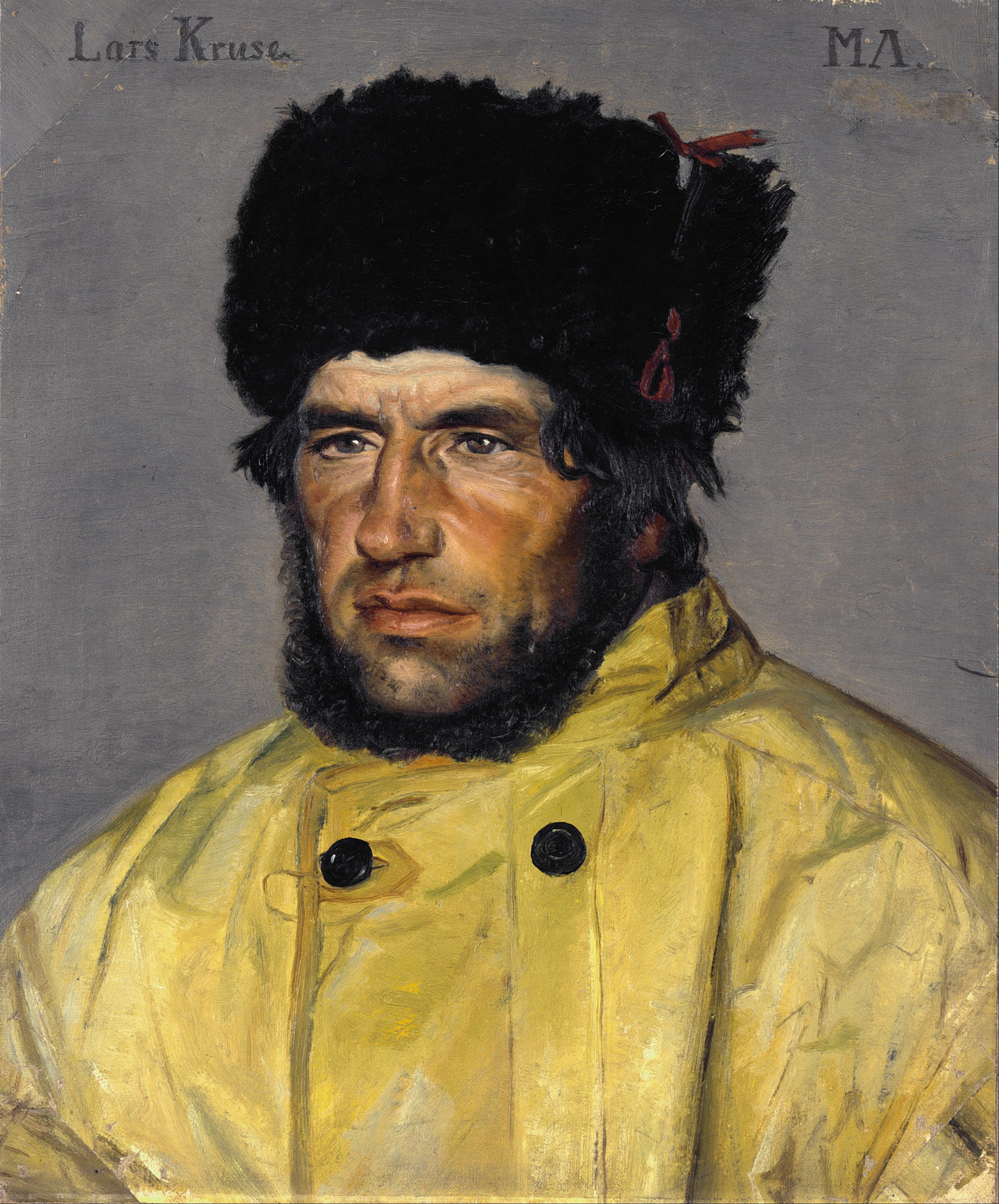
Michael Ancher: Portrait of Lars Kruse (1882)

Lars Andersen Kruse (1828–1894) was a fisherman from Skagen in the far north of Jutland, Denmark. He is remembered not only for his heroic rescues but for his portraits painted by Michael Ancher and an account of his mistreatment written by Holger Drachmann in a mixture of poems and prose.

== Biography ==
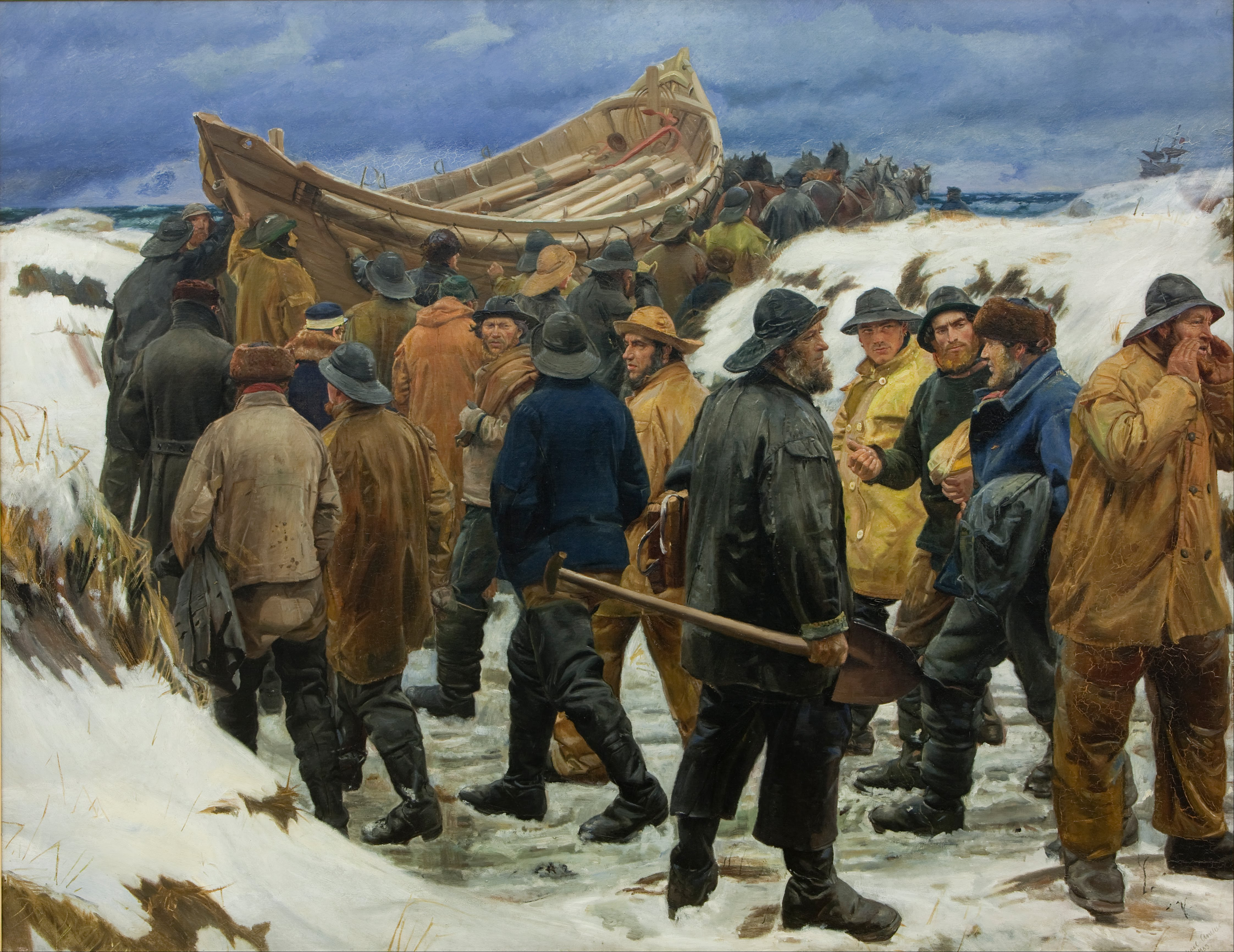
The Lifeboat is Taken through the Dunes, 1883

From an early age, Kruse took part in many rescues off Skagen's dangerous coasts, helping to save the lives of some 200 people. One of his most heroic exploits was on 27 December 1862 when the Swedish brig Daphne was stranded off the coast to the north. After the lifeboat had capsized and her crew of eight had drowned, Kruse took his own boat out into the storm and saved the ship's crew. He was immediately assigned to the Life-Saving Service, where he was put in charge of Skagen's lifeboat. In 1880, he was awarded a silver cross with the inscription: Ydmyg i Ordet, stolt i sin Daad, kristen i Gjerning, Mand i sin Baad (Humble in speech, Proud in deed, Christian in action, Man in his boat). Kruse drowned in March 1894 off Skagen's north beach, trying to reach land in a violent snowstorm.

== In literature and art ==
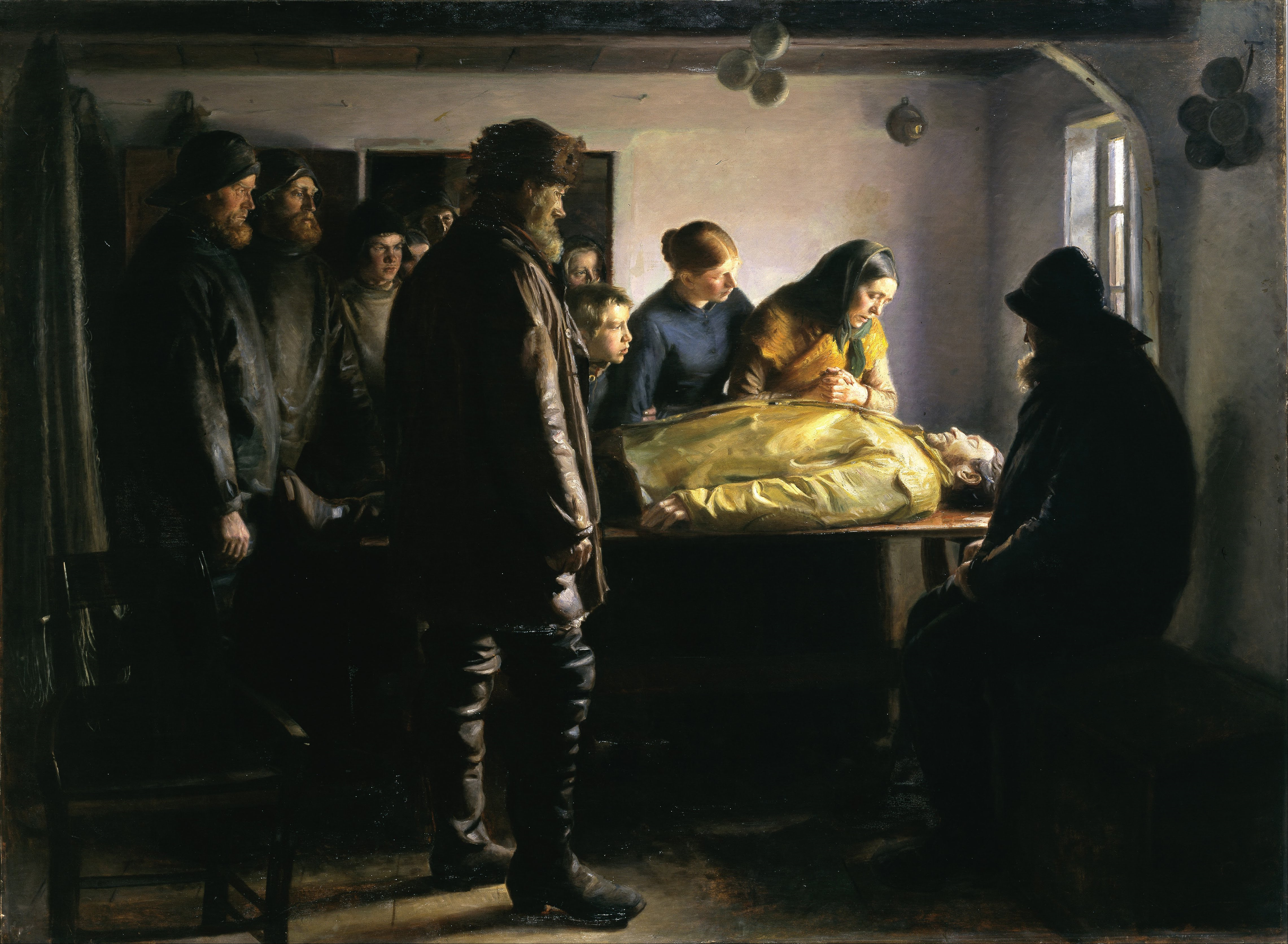
Michael Ancher: The drowned fisherman (1896); the painting was inspired by the death of Lars Kruse in 1894.

Lars Kruse's courage was recorded by Holger Drachmann in 1879 when he wrote a descriptive account interspersed with poems entitled: Lars Kruse. En Skildring fra Virkelighedens og Sandets Regioner (Lars Kruse. A Picture from Regions of Reality and Truth). The work tells how initially the authorities refused to award him a medal for his heroic rescues on the grounds that when a poor youngster, he had sold a plank which had drifted up on the beach and kept the money for himself. As a result of Drachmann's critical account of his treatment, Kruse was later awarded the Danish Medal of Merit.

Lars Kruse appears in several works by Michael Ancher of the Skagen Painters: Redningsformand Lars Kruse (Head of Lifesaving Lars Kruse, 1882), Lystige folk. I købmandens bod (Joyful folk in the shopkeeper's bar) from 1883, and Skagensfisker Lars Kruse i eftermiddagslys (Skagen Fisherman Lars Kruse in the Afternoon Light, 1908).

== Bibliography ==
- Müller, Poul; Drachmann, Holger; Rafn, Eyvind (1942). Lars Kruse.
- Rasmussen, Vang (1982). Lars Kruse. Tommeliden. ISBN 978-87-87807-50-0.
