= Kinch =

Kinch may refer to:

== People ==
Surname

- Arturo Kinch (born 1956), Costa Rican olympic skier
- Beverly Kinch (born 1964), British long jumper and sprinter
- Chad Kinch (1958–1994), American basketball player
- David Kinch (born 1961), American chef
- Don Kinch, Barbados-born playwright
- Helvig Kinch (1872–1956), Danish artist; wife of Karl Frederik
- Karl Frederik Kinch (1853–1921), Danish archaeologist; husband of Helvig
- Matt Kinch (born 1980), Canadian ice hockey player
- Myra Kinch (1904–1981), American choreographer
- Soweto Kinch (born 1978), British saxophonist
- Steve Kinch (born 1955), a bass guitar player from Manfred Mann's Earth Band

Given name

- Kinch Hoekstra, American legal scholar and academic

Nickname

- Iven Carl Kincheloe Jr. (1928–1958), American Korean War fighter ace and test pilot

== Places ==
- Mount Kinch, a volcanic knob in southwestern British Columbia, Canada
- Kinch, Iran, a village

== Arts and entertainment ==
- Stephen Dedalus, nicknamed "Kinch", James Joyce's literary alter ego, in Joyce's 1922 novel Ulysses and in A Portrait of the Artist as a Young Man
- Staff Sergeant James "Kinch" Kinchloe, a character in the television series Hogan's Heroes
- Kinch (band), an American indie pop band

== See also ==
- Kinch v Bullard, a 1998 English land law case
