= Sophie Pedersen =

Danish painter

Sophie Petrine Pedersen (15 January 1885 – 1 October 1950) was a Danish painter. She specialized in landscapes, including scenes of Copenhagen's streets and parks, but also created portraits and figure paintings. From 1921 to 1924, she headed the Danish Society of Female Artists (Kvindelige Kunstneres Samfund).

== Biography ==
Born in the Frederiksberg district of Copenhagen, Sophie Petrine Pedersen was the daughter of the carpenter and manufacturer Jacob Pedersen and Cathrine Olsen. After undertaking preparatory studies at the Arts and Crafts School for Women, from 1904 she studied at the Royal Danish Academy of Fine Arts under Viggo Johansen and Sigurd Wandel, graduating in 1910.

Pedersen painted portraits, figure paintings and above all landscapes. In addition to street paintings of Copenhagen, her landscapes included scenes from the south of France and Greece which she painted during her travel in the 1920s and early 1930s. As she matured, her works became more impressionistic and lighter in their colouring. She first exhibited at the Charlottenborg Spring Exhibitions in 1908 where she continued to present her work for the rest of her life. She also participated in the Charlottenborg Autumn Exhibitions and in a number of solo events. Pedersen was an active early member of the Danish Society of Female Artists, serving as president from 1921 to 1924.

Sophie Pedersen died on 1 October 1950 and is buried in Asminderød Cemetery in Fredensborg.

== Awards ==
Pedersen received a number of grants and awards, including:

- 1926: Den Sødringske Opmuntringspræmie for Landskab fra Sydfrankrig
- 1946: Eckersberg Medal for Stjerner
