= Karl Kinch =

Karl Kinch can refer to:

- Karl Frederik Kinch (1853–1921), a Danish archaeologist
- Karl Kinch (actor) (1892–1981), a Swedish actor, director, and opera singer
