= Lise Ring =

Danish sculptor (born 1936)

Lise Ring (born 1936) is a Danish sculptor who has been active in the country's art organizations. Working with stone, concrete, wood and silver, she has created naturalistic works depicting women, children and animals. Her organizational responsibilities have included selection judge and committee member for the Charlottenborg Exhibitions and chair of the Billedkunstnernes Forbund (Visual Artists Association) and of the Kvindelige Kunstneres Samfund (Society of Female Artists).

== Biography ==
Born in Copenhagen on 22 April 1936, Lise Ring is the daughter of the rubber tyre specialist Oskar Alfred Hansen and the goldsmith Astrid Ring Christensen. After completing her school education at Hillerødgade School, she took up needlework and craftsmanship. In the 1950s, she played the banjo at the Cap Horn bar in Nyhavn, creating herbal tea mugs with portraits of those in the band. She went on to earn a living by becoming a model at the Royal Danish Academy of Fine Arts.

In 1958, she married Johannes Angelo Reinholdt Jørgensen (1921–1997) who as a painter was known as Angelo Ring and as a writer, Johannes A. Hjort. They had a daughter, Katrine Ring. The following year, she embarked on six years of study at the Royal Academy's sculpture school under Mogens Bøggild and Poul Holm Olsen. From 1977 to 1985, she spent a lengthy period in Italy where in 1981 she headed the Scandinavian cultural association Circolo Scandinavo.

Ring has worked with stone, concrete, wood and silver, creating both small and large sculptures of women, children and animals in a naturalistic yet personal design language. Her works are intended to be appealing, encouraging people to interact with them. Her 1977 relief Girl with a Doll's Pram depicts a little girl peering into a pram followed by a little dog. Cut in a rounded square of sandstone, the work conveys a sense of organic life, typical of her human and animal sculptures. Her later, frequently larger figures stand free. Her Orangutangs (1991) attracted considerable attention when displayed on Jarmers Plads in central Copenhagen. She exhibited widely in the 1970s and 1980s, not only at Charlottenborg but at Den Frie Udstilling and in provincial museums.

In the 1970s, after following courses in teaching and psychology, and taught evening classes. Thanks to a scholarship from Queen Ingrid's Roman Foundation, in 1977 she went to Italy where she furthered her studies at the Vanucci Academy in Perugia. On returning to Denmark in 1983, she became involved in professional policy work, especially in connection with conditions for women artists. This led to responsibilities for the Charlottenborg Spring Exhibitions leading to her inclusion on the Charlottenborg board (1988–1990). She chaired the Visual Artists Association (1992) and was on the board of representatives of the Danish Arts Foundation (1993–1997). From 2000 to 2010, she chaired Kvindelige Kunstneres Samfund.
