= Inger Lut Debois =

Danish painter (1931–2015)

Inger Merete Lut Debois née Andersen (1931–2015) was a Danish painter. She is remembered for her works with interacting figures which became increasingly abstract as she matured. In 1992, Debois decorated the IC3 train "Thyra Danebod". From 1992 to 2000, she headed Kvindelige Kunstneres Samfund (KKS), the Danish Society of Female Artists.

== Biography ==
Born on 15 July 1931 in Vejle, Inger Merete Lut Andersen was the daughter of Major Svend Halvor Andersen and Rigmor Marie Andersen. In 1952, she married the painter and photographer Sven Arne Debois from Iceland. Their daughter Jette Debois (born 1956) is also a painter.

She attended the painting school at the Royal Danish Academy of Fine Arts where she studied under William Scharff, graduating in 1956. Her early works depicted figures in psychic relationships. They later developed into more abstract paintings in which strong colour and brush strokes are the dominant elements.

Debois exhibited at the Charlottenborg Spring Exhibitions from 1962 to 1985, apart from 1975 to 1981 when she was a member of the selection committee. Her works were also included in the KKS Jubilee Exhibition at the Skovgaard Museum in 1977. More recently, many of her remaining paintings together with some of her daughter Jette's early works were included at the 2018 exhibition of five women artists in Korsør.

In addition to her creative work, for many years Debois devoted time and energy to organizational responsibilities. In particular, from 1902 to 2002 she headed the Society of Female Artists where she contributed to the visibility and influence of women artists.

Inger Lut Debois died in Copenhagen on 19 February 2015.
