= Kvindelige Kunstneres Samfund =

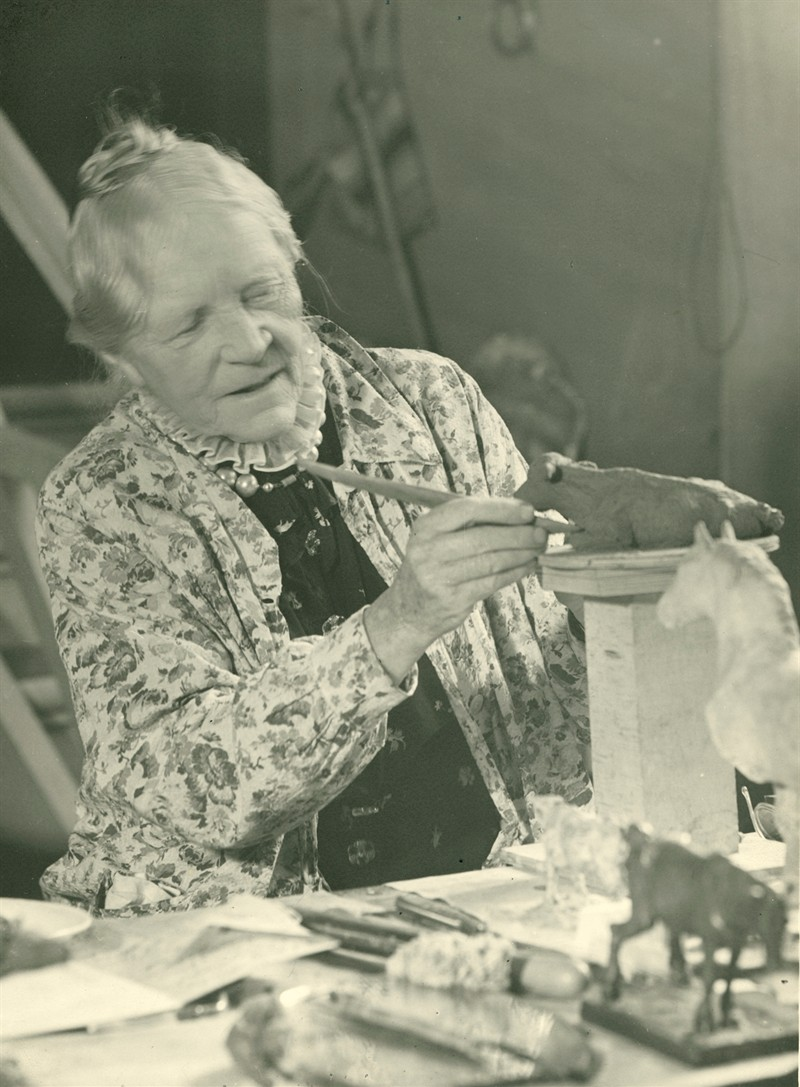
Anne Marie Carl-Nielsen

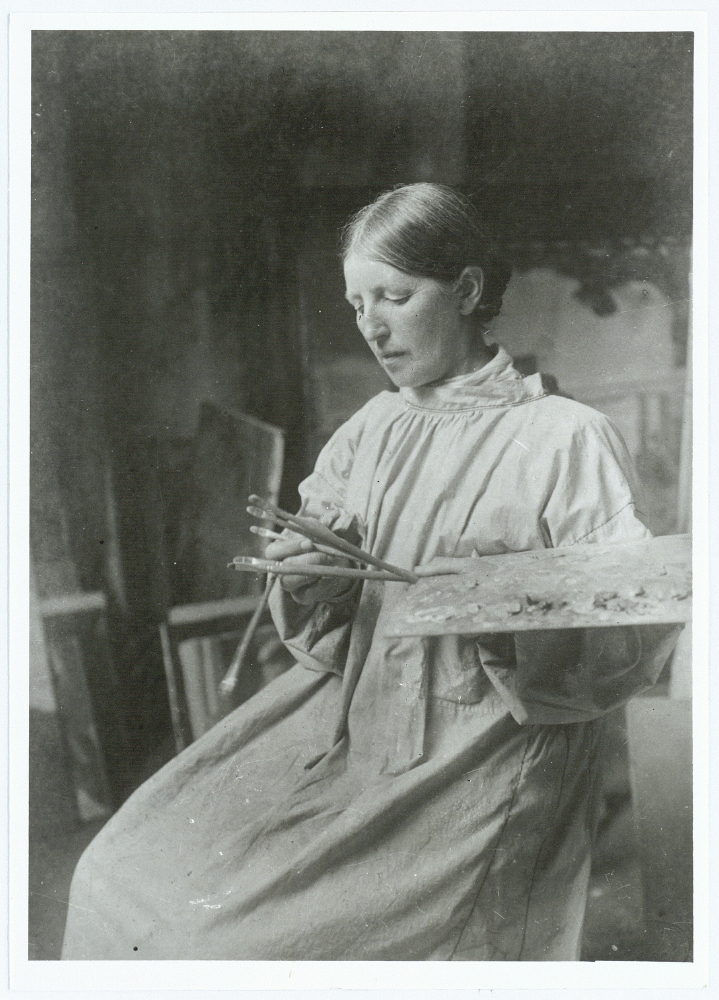
Anna Ancher

Kvindelige Kunstneres Samfund (KKS) or Society of Female Artists is a Danish organization which strives to enable women to work as professional artists on equal terms with their male counterparts. KKS was founded by the painters Marie Henriques and Helvig Kinch on 7 February 1916. With the support of the painter Anna Ancher and the sculptor Anne Marie Carl-Nielsen, 75 artists attended the inaugural meeting. Today the organization has over 250 members.

== History ==
Around 1915, Denmark's female artists began to realize that they needed to club together if they were to enjoy the same opportunities as their male counterparts. Elisabeth Bernekow of Föreningen Svenska Konstnärinnor (Society of Swedish Female Artists) which had been founded in 1910 provided Helvig Kinch with background information and advice to assist her in her efforts to establish a similar organization in Denmark. Together with the painter Marie Henriques and the sculptor Anne Marie Carl-Nielsen, she drafted an invitation which established the basic objectives of the planned organization. These were aimed above all at facilitating opportunities for women to exhibit their work. The invitation explained that this would be achieved by liaising with those responsible for exhibitions in Denmark and abroad, ensuring that women were included in the corresponding committees and juries, and encouraging both men and women to support the interests of female artists.

Endorsed by 25 female artists, the invitation was sent out to women involved in art and craftmanship who had exhibited publicly on at least three occasions. As a result, at the organization's inaugural meeting on 7 February 1916, 75 women signed up as members of the KKS.

Many of the earlier members experienced considerable difficulties. Anna Ancher and several of her colleagues were wary of being considered "women artists" if they became too involved in achieving equal rights. They were concerned first and foremost by their artwork, keen to be judged side-by-side with male artists.

== Recent developments ==
With the publication in 2014 of 100 års øjeblikke : Kvindelige Kunstneres Samfund, presenting key events over the past 100 years, the organization was able to highlight several women artists who had been forgotten while highlighting the difficulties women artists faced in striving to enhance their status. Today, the organization continues to ensure that the works of women artists, including those working in craftmanship, are treated equally to those of men. Thanks to the 2014 anthology, in collaboration with professionals and other organizations, KKS hopes to contribute to the history of art by revealing significant female artists who have been forgotten.

== Presidents of Kvindelige Kunstneres Samfund ==
As listed in 100 års øjeblikke : Kvindelige Kunstneres Samfund and at KKS:

- 1916-1918 Helvig Kinch, painter and sculptor
- 1918-1920 Marie Henriques, painter
- 1920-1921 Agnes Lunn, sculptor
- 1921-1924 Sophie Pedersen, painter
- 1924-1954 Elisabeth Neckelmann, painter
- 1954-1992 Gudrun Poulsen, painter
- 1992-2000 Inger Lut Debois, painter
- 2000-2010 Lise Ring, sculptor
- 2010-2019 Kit Kjærbye, sculptor
- 2019- Lise Seier Petersen, ceramist
