= Helvig Kinch =

Danish painter (1872–1956)

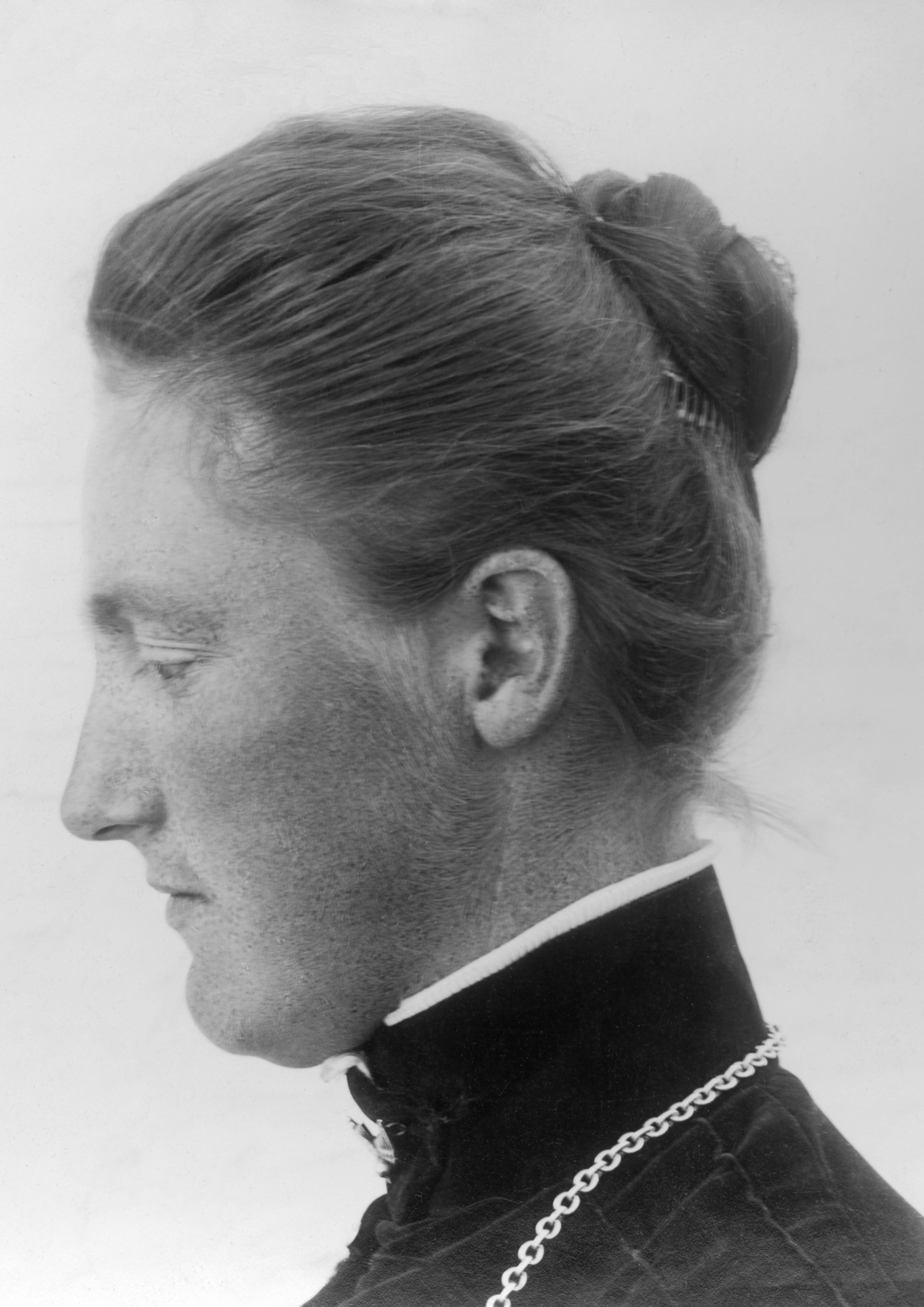
Helvig Kinch.

Helvig Agnete Kinch née Amsinck (1872–1956) was a Danish artist who specialized in painting animals, especially horses. In the early 20th century, she participated in archaeological research near Lindos on the island of Rhodes, creating landscapes of the area and illustrating the artefacts discovered there. Together with Marie Henriques, in 1916 she established the Danish Society of Female Artists (Kvindelige Kunstneres Samfund) to encourage women artists to exhibit their works.

== Biography ==
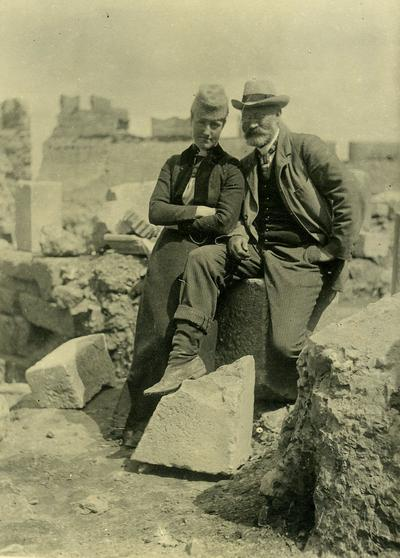
Helvig Kinch and Karl Frederik Kinch at the Limbos acropolis (c. 1903)

Born on 10 December 1872, Agnete Helvig Amsinck was the daughter of the high-ranking official Conrad Amsinch (1830–1897) and Caroline Amalie Hansen (1840–1922). After preparatory training in art at the Arts and Crafts School for Women (1888–90), she attended the women's department of the Royal Danish Academy of Fine Arts where she studied under Viggo Johansen and graduated in 1894.

During her studies, she visited London and in 1897, she went on study trips to Berlin, Dresden, Munich and Nuremberg. From 1896 and for the rest of her life, she exhibited at the Charlottenborg Spring Exhibition. She also arranged solo exhibitions and submitted works to the Charlottenborg Austum Exhibitions, mainly paintings of animals and birds, especially horses. Her interest in horses began as a child when she lived near Christiansborg Palace with its stables.

Cultivating an interest in antiquity, she attended the lectures given by the art historian Julius Lange. In 1902, she took part in an expedition to Lindos on the island of Rhodes where she met the archaeologist Karl Frederik Kinch (1853–1921). The two married on 5 October 1903 and had a daughter, Gunhild, the following year. She accompanied her husband on several other expeditions to Rhodes, including those to Vroulia (1907–14). Many of her illustrations are included in her husband's major work Fouilles de Vroulia (Rhodes) (Berlin 1914) while others are in the collections of the Carlsberg Foundation or the National Museum of Denmark.

Together with the artist Marie Henriques, in 1916 Kinch founded the Danish Society of Female Artists, heading the organization until 1918. The main objective was to improve opportunities for women artists to exhibit their work, in part by having women appointed to the selection committees. Starting with 75 members, the society received support from the painter Anna Ancher and the sculptor Anne Marie Carl-Nielsen.

Following her husband's death in 1921, Kinch continued to paint animals, including some from her trips to Brittany and Normandy in 1926 and 1930, and to the north of Italy in 1933. She also created clay sculptures, illustrated children's books and developed templates for embroidery.

Helvig Kinch died in Copenhagen on 31 August 1956.
