= Elisabeth Neckelmann =

Danish painter

Elisabeth Neckelmann (1884–1956) was a Danish painter. Her early associations with the Funen Painters influenced her work which consisted mainly of flower paintings and landscapes but also included portraits. From 1924 to 1954, she headed the Danish Society of Female Artists where she helped women to become professional artists on the same basis as their male counterparts. She was a member of various art exhibition selection committees, including that for Charlottenborg.

== Early life ==
Born in the Frederiksberg district of Copenhagen on 6 November 1884, Elisabeth Neckelmann was the daughter of the engineer Ludvig Conrad Neckelmann (1852–1922) and Elisa Nikoline Schoubye (1862–1948). Interested in painting as a child, she visited Peter Hansen who was a friend of the family and experimented with his paints and brushes. In 1898, after a difficult divorce, her mother married Hansen and the family moved to Faaborg on the island of Funen. As a result, Neckelmann became acquainted with the Funen Painters. When she was 16, she was given her own watercolours.

== Career ==
Naturally talented, she received drawing lessons from Fritz Syberg but otherwise developed her painting abilities herself. In 1905, she moved with her father-in-law to Copenhagen where she worked for two years at Arnbak's art dealership. She made a number of trips to Germany, Sweden, Norway and the Netherlands in the early 1900s. From 1912, she exhibited at Charlottenborg as well as at solo exhibitions. Her submissions included paintings of flowers, landscapes and portraits.

Although Neckelmann was self-taught, she was soon recognized by women active on the art scene with whom she became active in the need for female artists to receive the same opportunities for exhibiting their work as men. With this in view, in 1916, together with Marie Henriques, she founded the Society for Female Artists where she was president from 1924 to 1954. She opened her home for discussions, gave interviews to the press and generally supported the role of women artists. She sat on several exhibition selection committees as well as the Academy Council (1931–37) and the Charlottenborg Board.

Elisabeth Neckelmann died in Copenhagen on 21 November 1956 and is buried in Bispebjerg Cemetery.
