= Gudrun Poulsen =

Danish painter (1918–1999)

Gudrun Thorgerd Erna Poulsen (7 March 1918– 20 July 1999) was a Danish painter. Inspired by nature, she painted mainly country landscapes, often including cows. From the 1960s, she spent much of her time painting on the island of Møn while in the 1970s she turned to religious works with animals. A strong supporter of women artists, from 1954 to 1992 she headed Denmark's Society of Female Artists.

== Early life ==
Born in Copenhagen, Gudrun Thorgerd Erna Poulsen was the daughter of the lawyer Poul Mikael Poulsen (1880–1939) and the schoolteacher Jenny Ottosen (1881–1950). She was brought up in Hellerup by two outgoing parents. Her mother, a schoolteacher, held Bible classes in the home while her father was active as a trade union lawyer and as an advisor to political leaders including Prime Minister Thorvald Stauning. Poulsen showed interest in drawing as a small child, perhaps encouraged by the sculptor Rudolph Tegner, a frequent visitor. Her interest in landscapes and cows started when she was visiting her grandparents on their farm near Bramming in southwestern Jutland. She later spend as much time there as possible.

Although her parents encouraged her to become an artist, they ensured she received a good education. After matriculating from Aurehøj High School in 1936, she attended N. Zahle's School where she qualified as a schoolteacher. After teaching for a number of years, she took painting lessons under Erik Clemmensen (1905–1984) before being admitted to the Royal Danish Academy of Fine Arts in 1945. Her professors included Vilhelm Lundstrøm, Kræsten Iversen and Elof Risebye. While at the Academy, she developed a lifelong friendship with the painter Knod Lollesgaard (1911–1997).

== Career ==
On graduating in 1952, she established a studio in Nyhavn. She had already begun to exhibit at the Charlottenborg Autumn Exhibitions in 1946 and continued to exhibit there, also participating in the Spring Exhibitions from 1956 to 1973. Her works were presented in many other exhibitions, both in Denmark and abroad.

Poulsen's favourite subjects were country scenes and animals, often with cows in hilly landscapes, painted with light brushstrokes in dark earthy tones. In 1963, she started to spend lengthy periods on the island of Møn, developing friendships with the painter Anne Marie Telmányi, the composer Ove Scavenius (1884–1973) and the celebrated actress Asta Nielsen whose portrait she painted in 1981.

Poulsen was a strong supporter of women artists. For 38 years, she headed the Society of Female Artists where she fought tirelessly for ensuring women had the same visibility and rights as their male counterparts. From 1954, she supported Kunstnernes Statsunderstøttede Croquisskole (Artists' State-Supported Croquis School) where she served as treasurer. In 1984, she became a board member of the Thorvaldsen Museum. Other responsibilities included positions on the Academy Council and the Academy of Fine Arts.

Gudrun Poulsen died in Copenhagen.

== Awards ==
Poulsen's scholarships and awards include:

- 1958: Oscar Carlsons Award
- 1989: Eckersberg Medal
- 1990: Danish Arts Foundation
