= Helga Johansen =

Danish writer

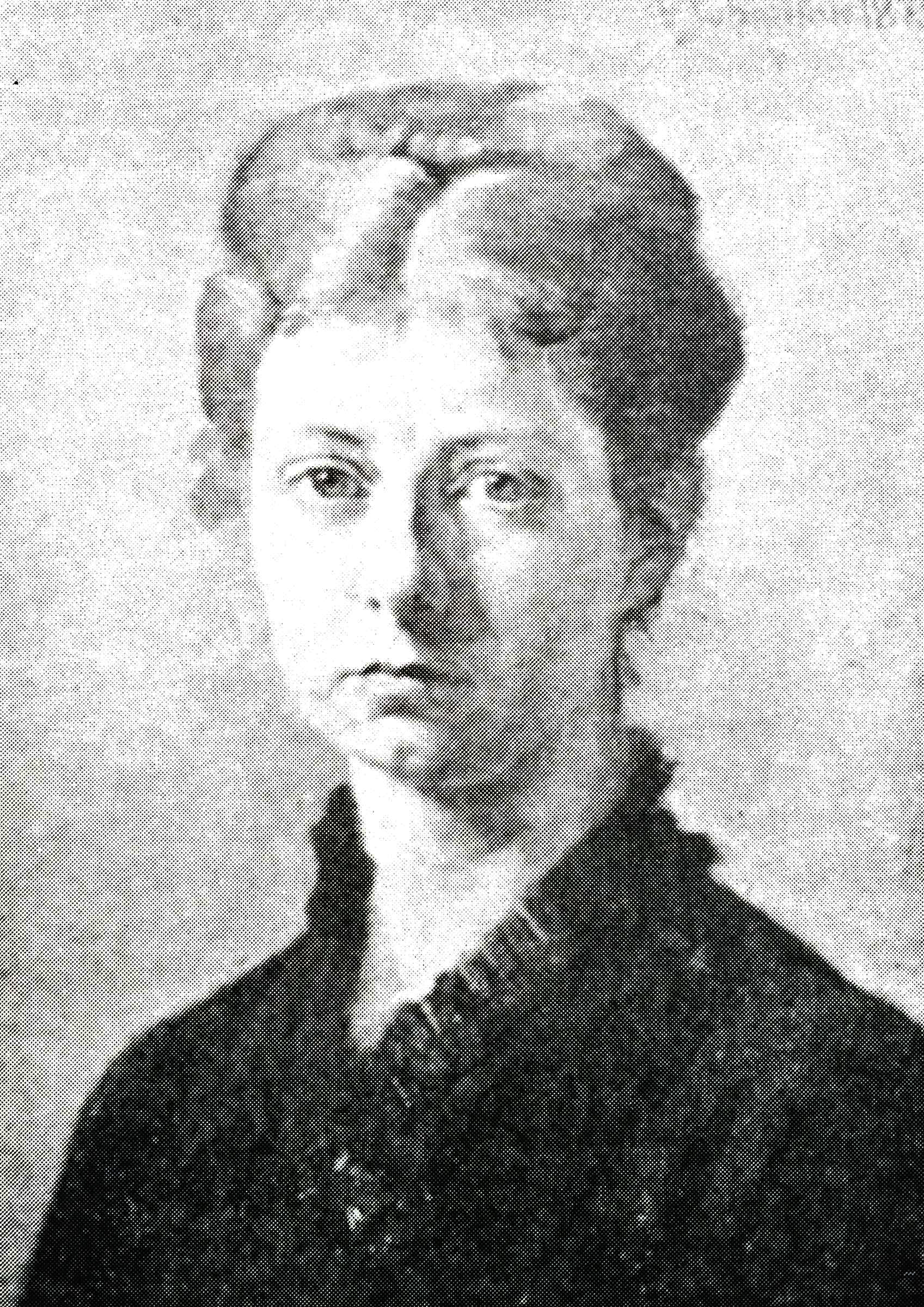
Helga Johansen, portrait by Viggo Johansen (1900)

Helga Johansen (1852–1912) was a Danish writer whose works are associated with the period in Scandinavian literature known as The Modern Breakthrough. The sister of painter Viggo Johansen, she was brought up in a well-to-do Copenhagen home. After intermittently working as a teacher, she began to suffer from mental illness. In 1896, writing under the pen name Et Fruentime (A Woman) she made her debut with the novel Rids, tre monologer (Outline, Three Monologues). This was followed in 1900 by Hinsides: En psykologisk Redegørelse (Beyond: A Psychological Account), drawing on her own experience of hospitalization with a confused combination of thoughts and monologues.

== Early life ==
Born on 12 August 1852 in Copenhagen, Helga Johansen was the daughter of the merchant Frederik Christoph Johansen (1804–74) and his wife Camilla Petrine née Jepsen (1815–92). While still a small child she suffered a leg injury but nevertheless was able to care for her ailing mother until she died in 1892. Graduating in 1879 as a teacher from the Beyers, Bohrs and Femmers College, she taught intermittently while undertaking her own studies of Hebrew and of philosophy with the assistance of Harald Høffding. Johansen suffered from mental illness and was hospitalized more than once in the 1880s.

== Career as a writer ==
It was not until her mid-forties that Johansen embarked on writing, publishing three novels around the turn of the century. The first Rids (Outline, 1896) under the pen name Et Fruentimmer is made up of three sections, two of them monologues, the third based on her own dramatic experiences of the mental hospital Sankt Hans which the patients try to burn down on the eve of midsummer's night. Using the pen name Hannah Joël she went on to publish Hinsides (Beyond, 1900) and Brev til Menneskene (Letter to Humankind, 1903). An imaginary account of the author's medical history is presented in Hinsides, as she plays with the relationship between language and phenomena, evoking limbs and hands rather than people with elements such as dots and stripes. In Brev til Mennesjene, she expresses the effects of facing up to madness with the result that abstraction becomes symbolism and aetheticism, myth.

Helga Johansen died on 25 December 1912.
