= Kinch v Bullard =

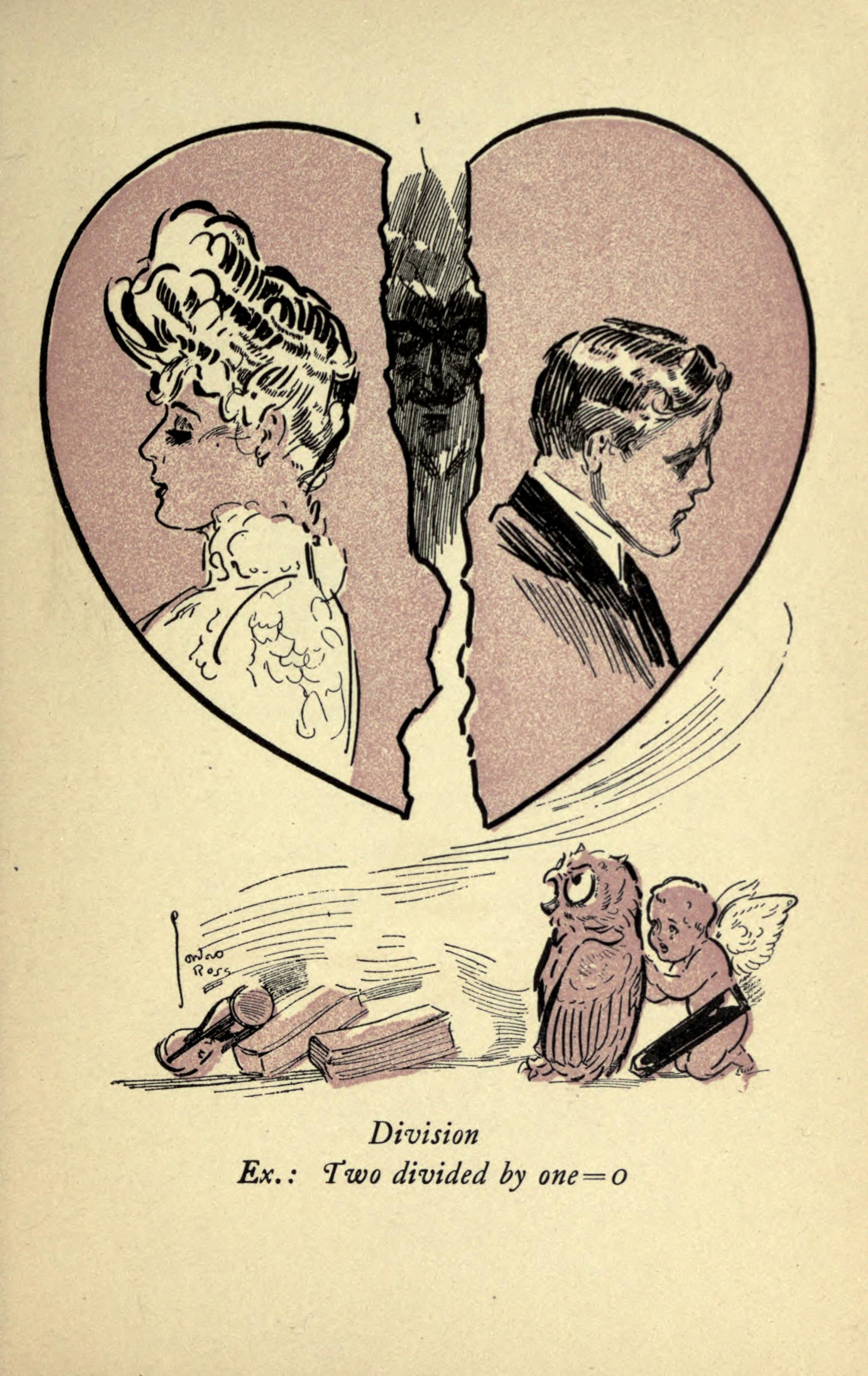
- Court: High Court, Chancery Division
- Full case name: J Kinch and C N Willett as Executors of Bryan Johnson deceased v Executors of Mrs Johnson deceased
- Decided: 27 July 1998
- Citations: [1998] 4 All ER 650 [1999] 1 WLR 423 [1999] 1 FLR 66

Case history
- Prior action: none
- Subsequent action: none

Court membership
- Judge sitting: Mr Justice Neuberger (Neuberger J)

Case opinions
- The notice was intended at the time and was effective. The fact it was never read and destroyed after delivery by the sender is irrelevant.

Keywords
- Co-ownership; severance of joint tenancy (s.36(2) Law of Property Act 1925); postal rule; letter never read

Kinch v Bullard [1998] 4 All ER 650 is an English land law case, concerning co-ownership of land and an act of severance of a joint tenancy, whether caught by the deemed-delivered provisions of the common law postal rule.

== Facts ==
Mr and Mrs Johnson, beneficial joint tenants (of the two forms of joint ownership the standard arrangement for spouses co-owning land), were divorcing. Mrs Johnson was terminally ill. Mrs. sent Mr. a letter by ordinary first-class post stating her intention to sever her interest. It was delivered, but before seeing it Mr. suffered a heart attack. Mrs. realised she was likely to outlive him, survivorship would then operate passing the property to her completely, so she destroyed the letter. He (indeed) died a few weeks later and she died a few months later.

His executors, consulting with the beneficiaries, chose to sue her executors to decide whether the notice severed the form of ownership (if so, then his last Will and Testament would chiefly determine the fate of his 50% stake in the property as long as it made adequate provision for all dependants under the relevant family/dependency Act of 1975). (Note: The Will, like most, did it seems make adequate provision under The Inheritance (Provision for Family and Dependants) Act 1975 as this point was not raised.) If not, the Will could have no effect on the death estate; the property would become hers absolutely, subject to any dependency of his or clear unreasonableness.

The law was unclear.

== Judgment ==
Neuberger J held that the notice was effective. He did not take counsel’s argument for her estate that because Mrs. no longer, at that time, ‘desires to sever the joint tenancy’, the statutory precondition for valid notice was not there under section 36(2) (of the Law of Property Act 1925). This, he held, was wrong because the function of section 36(2) was not to bring the court to enquire into the parties’ state of mind. He said:

I reach this conclusion based on the proper construction of section 36(2). However, it appears to me that it is also correct as a matter of policy. If it were possible for a notice of severance or any other notice to be ineffective because, between the sender putting it in the post and the addressee receiving it, the sender changed his mind, it would be inconvenient and potentially unfair. The addressee would not be able to rely confidently upon a notice after it had been received, because he might subsequently be faced with the argument that the sender had changed his mind after sending it and before its receipt. Further, as I have already mentioned, it is scarcely realistic to think that the legislature intended that the court could be required to inquire into the state of mind of the sender of the notice in order to decide whether the notice was valid.

=== Obiter dictum ===
But, explained Neuberger J, it would probably be otherwise if a withdrawal was communicated before a notice was given (or deemed given), applying Holwell Securities Ltd v Hughes. This was just, however, ‘no more than a tentative view' — an obiter dictum (other words and side-opinions of the court).

== Cases considered ==
Binding precedents

- Lord Newborough v Jones [1975] EWCA

== See also ==
- English trusts law
- English land law
- English property law
