= Nyhavn 21 =

Listed building in Copenhagen

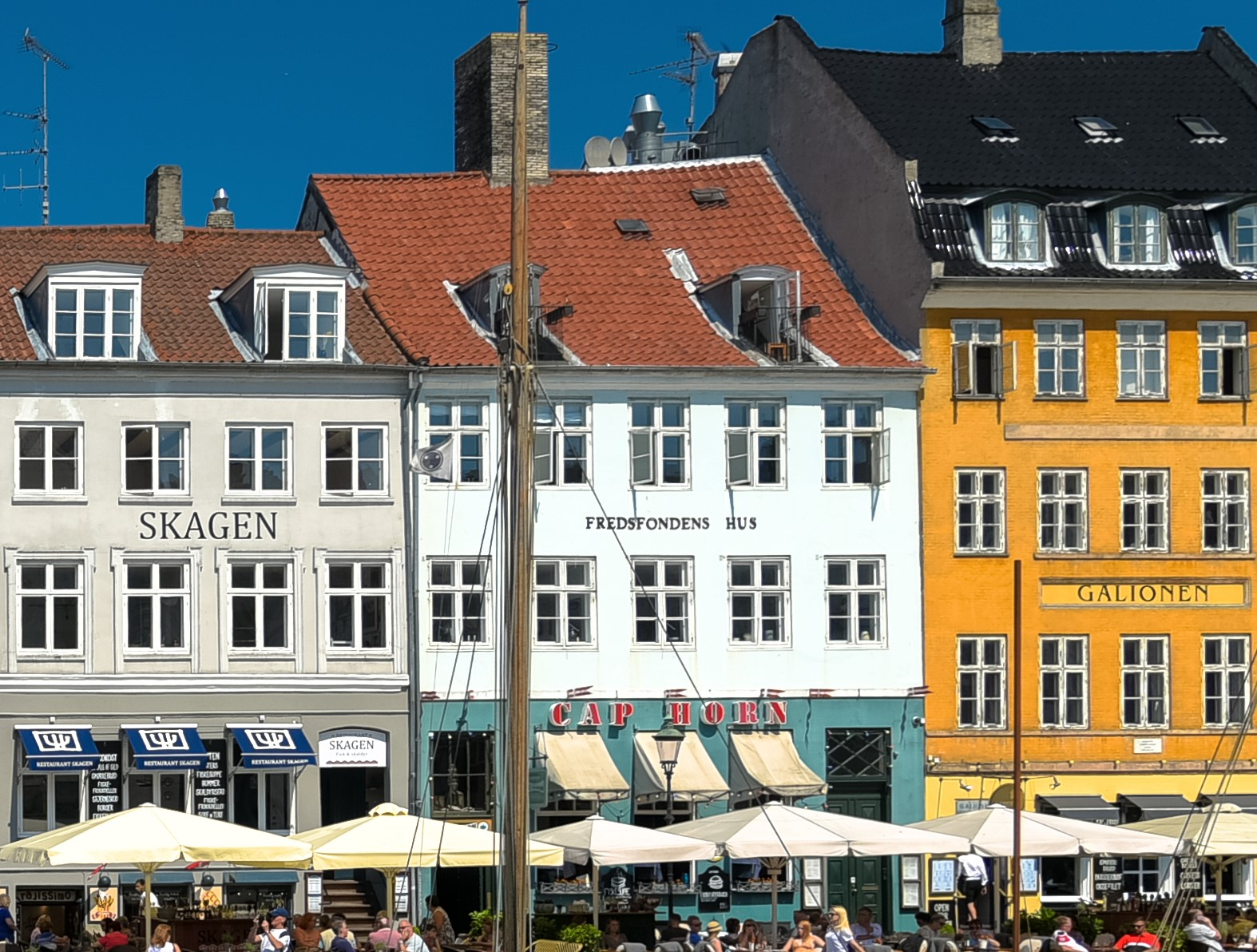
- Interactive map of the Nyhavn 21 area

General information
- Location: Copenhagen, Denmark, Denmark
- Coordinates: 55°40′49.51″N 12°35′22.27″E
- Completed: 18th century

Nyhavn 21/Lille Strandstræde 4, formerly known as Hotel L'ven, Hotel Kronprinsen and Fredsfondens Hus (The Peace Foundation's House), is a complex of historic buildings overlooking the Nyhavn canal in central Copenhagen, Denmark. It consists of a late 17th-century building in Nyhavn (heightened in c. 1790) and a just two bays wide building in Lille Strandstræde as well as a two-storey rear wing from 1748. It was listed in the Danish registry of protected buildings and places in 1945. The restaurant Cap Horn was a popular jazz venue in the 1950s. It is now part of the Tholstrup restaurant group. Notable former residents include the politician Jens Christian Christensen and painters Anna and Michael Ancher.

== History ==
=== 18th century ===
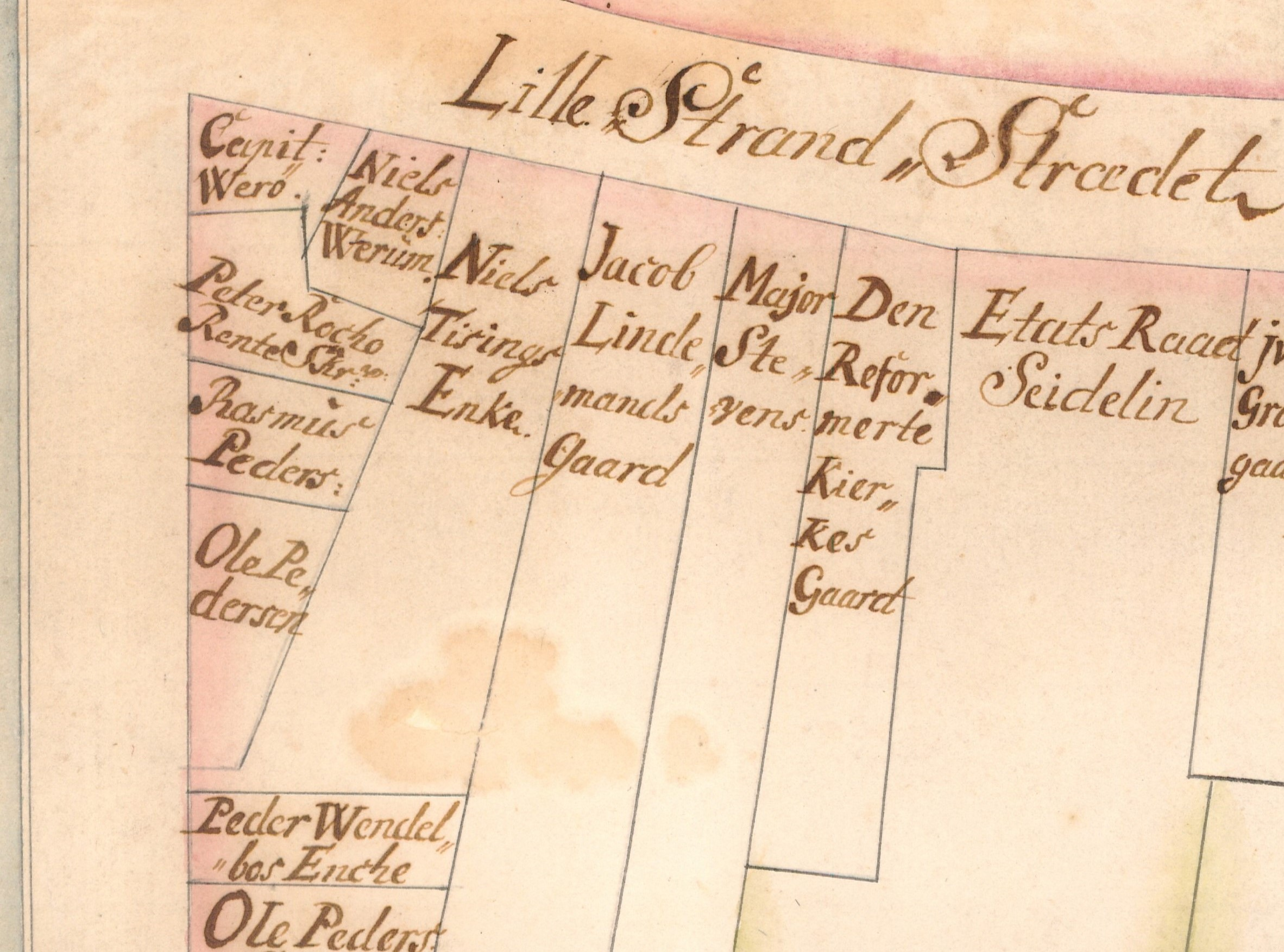
The property seen in a detail from a plan of the area from 1731

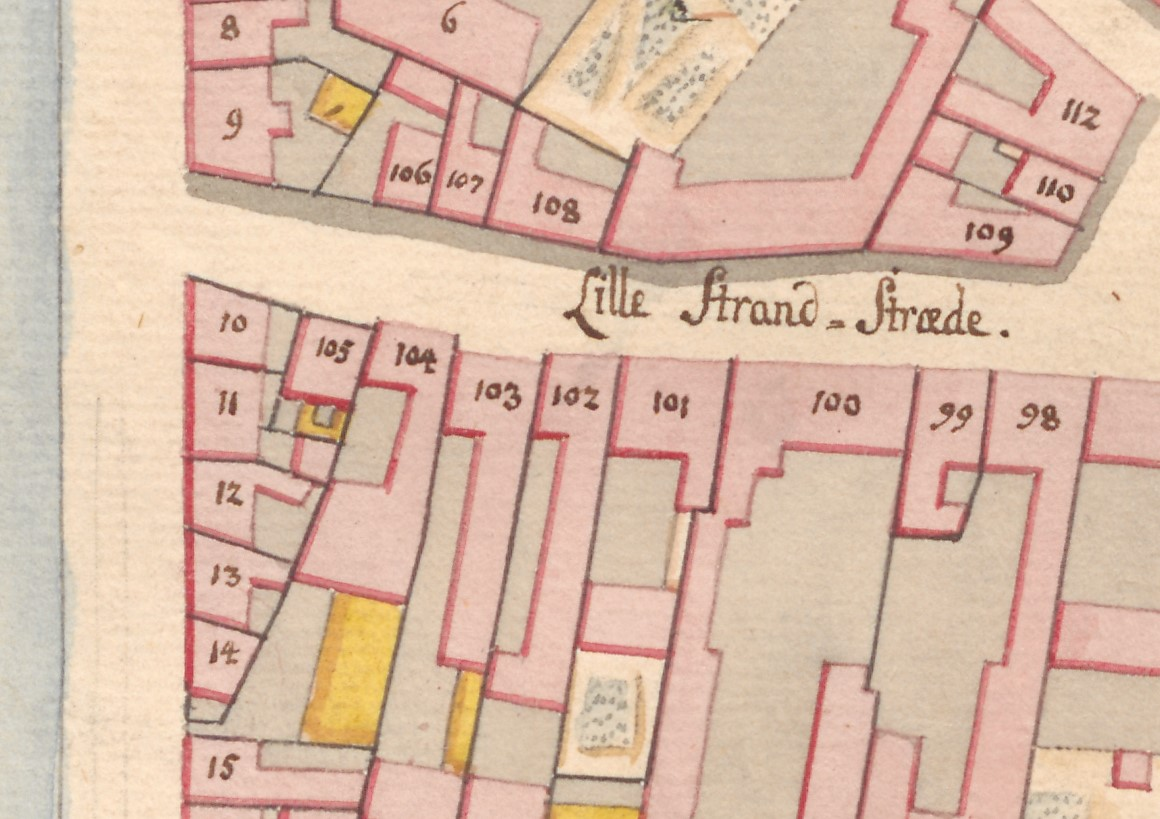
No. 11 and No. 105 seen in a detail from Christian Gedde's map of St. Ann's East Quarter, 1757

The site was formerly part of a much larger property. The property was listed in Copenhagen's first cadastre of 1689 as No. 9 in St. Ann's East Quarter. It was owned by stonemason Hans Friedrich at that time. The property was later divided into a number of smaller properties. The building now known as Nyhavn 21 was probably constructed with two storeys in around 1687. The property was for a while owned by John H. Jungesbludt. The rear wing was constructed for him in 1748. The property was listed in the new cadastre of 1756 as No. 11 in St. Ann's East Quarter. It was owned by Jens Walbom at that time. The property now known as Lille Strandstræde 4 was listed in the new cadastre of 1756 as No. 105 and belonged to distiller Hans Andersen.

The building at No. 105 (now Lille Strandstræde 4) was constructed for grocer (urtekræmmer) Henrik Wahlbohm in 1780.

=== Johan Hinrich Salomon ===
The property was later acquired by the surgeon Johan Hinrich Salomon. His property was home to 20 residents in three households at the 1787 census. The owner resided in the building with his second wife Zidsel Mullene Basballe, two children from his first marriage (aged 10 and 12) and one maid. Nicolaus Hinrich Fleu, a captain in the Norwegian Life Regiment, resided in another apartment with his wife Maria Teilman, their two daughters (aged 11 and 12), the 13-year-old naval cadet Jørgen Neergaard, soldier in the Norwegian Life Regiment Francois Tinulin (servant) and two maids. Hans Jurgen Spur, a ferryman, resided in the third apartment with his wife Ingerborg Jens Datter, their two sons (aged three and seven), his sister-in-law Margaretha Jens Datter, one maid and one lodger (sail maker).

Salomonsen's daughter Anne Sophie was later married to the master tailor August Wilhelm Kramfas. They resided in one of the apartments with their two children (aged one and three) at the time of the 1801 census. Johan Henrich Salomon, who had become a widower, resided in another apartment with his son Simon Henrich Salomonsen and one maid. Olew Grøn, a merchant, resided in a third apartment with his wife Karen Birck, their nine-year-old son Olive Bolette Grøn and one maid. Christian Østerfeldt, a master painter, resided in another apartment with his housekeeper Anne Marie Schiødt. Søren Møller, a baker, resided in the building with his wife Johanne Jensen and one maid. Jens Kragh, a watchman, resided in the building with his wife Marie Christensen, their one-year-old son Jens Kragh, one maid and two lodgers (sailors).

=== 1834 census ===
The property was home to 34 residents in six households at the 1834 census. Beverlin Christian Reiersen (1792-1847), a merchant (grosserer), resided on the ground floor with the servant Anders Pedersen. Johan Appelgren, a businessman (handelsfuldmægtig), resided on the first floor with his wife Sophia M. Appelgren (née Lund), their two sons (aged four and six), his wife's relative Wilhelmine Hausman and one maid. Jes Regenburg, a former merchant (grosserer), resided on the first floor with his wife Magdalene Mussmann, their two children (aged 15 and 19) and his 18-year-old nephew Heinrich Regenburg. Philip Hundevadt, a mate and barkeeper, resided in the basement with his wife Regine Marie Hanssen, their 10-year-old daughter Johanne Dorretea Friderica Kølnetz, two lodgers and one maid. Jens Jensen, a master joiner, resided on the first floor of the rear wing with hiswife Abiagel Catrine Henningsen and their four children (aged 14 to 23). Christian Nelssen Med Tilnavn Hylleqvist, a grocer (høker), resided in the basement of the Lille Strandstræde building with his wife Marie Sophie Krumhuus, their four children (aged one to 19), one maid and two lodgers.

=== 1840 census ===
The property was home to 38 residents at the 1840 census. Johan Appelgreen was still residing on the first floor with his wife, two sons (aged 10 and 12) and one maid. Peter Rasmussen, a master shoemaker, resided on the ground floor with his wife Caroline Margrethe Rasmussen (née Lauritzen), four shoemakers (employees) and two apprentices. Sara Ulrikke Løvenhjelm, a widow, resided on the first floor with the 25-year-old unmarried woman Wilhelmine Ratzau. Two widows and a lieutenant at the 2nd Jutland Regiment resided on the second floor. Niels Chr. Berg, a master joiner, resided on the second floor with his wife Frederikke Berg (née Kyst), their two children (aged three and six) and two apprentices. Peter Nielsen, a barkeeper, resided in the basement with his wife Marie Nielsen, their two children (aged three and five, one maid and two lodgers (sailors). Carl Ludvig Høyer, another barkeeper, resided in the basement (probably of the Lille Strandstræde building) with his wife Louise Høyer, their one-year-old twin sons, one maid and one lodger (a mate).

=== Hotel Løven ===
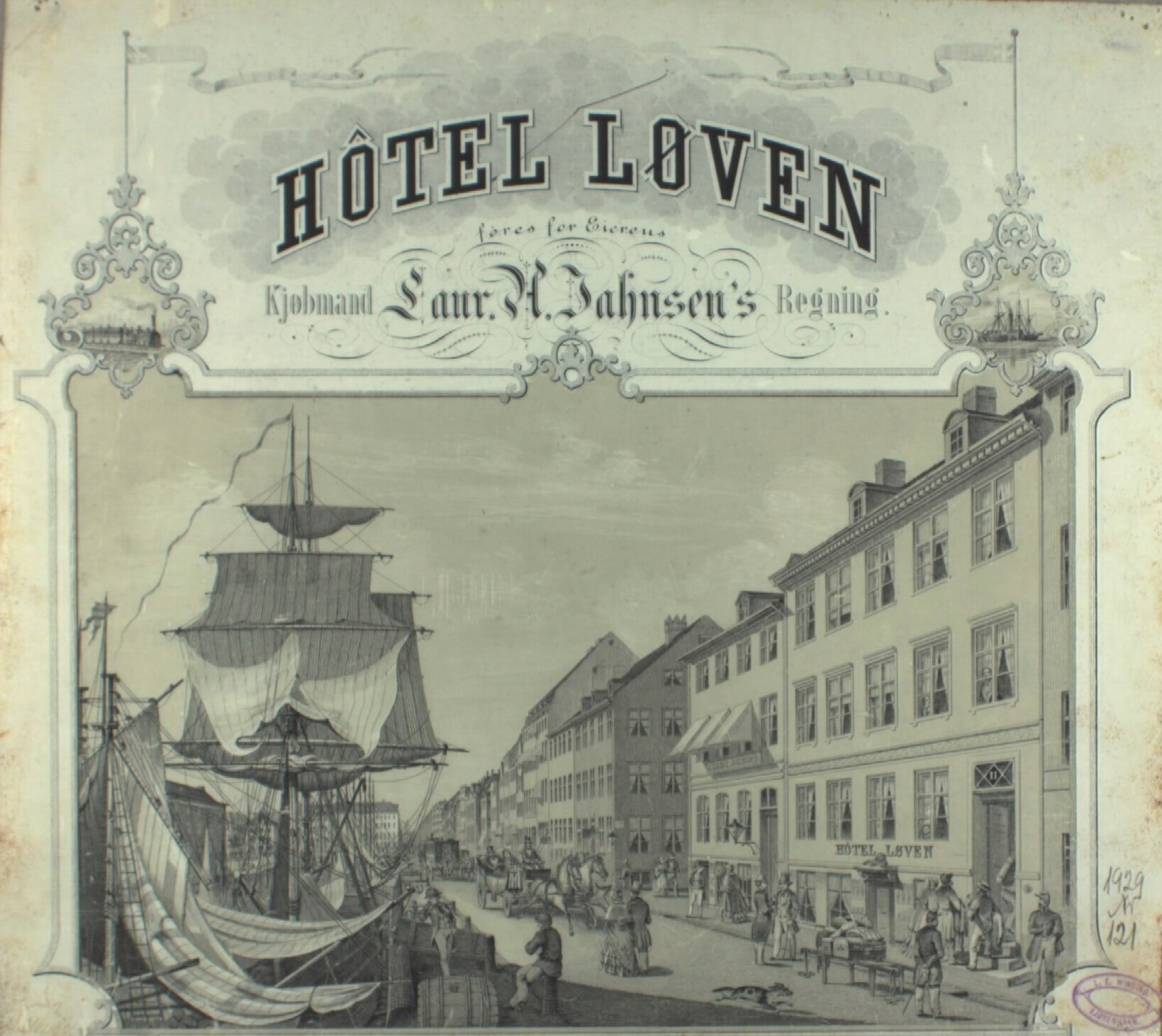
Advert for Hotel Løven with the building visible farthest to the right

The property was later converted into a hotel under the name Hotel Løben ("The Lion"). A figure of a reclining lion rested on a no longer existing hood mould above the basement entrance (cf. the lamb above the main entrance of Kvæsthusgade 5. The owner installed a large freshwater container in the building. It was connected to his lavatories and emptied directly into the canal. This arrangement resulted in a 50 rigsdaler fine from the police.

The property belonged to Lauritz Aaby (1799-1871) at the time of the 1850 census. He resided on the first floor with his wife Ane Gertrud Mülertz, a housekeeper, a female cook, two maids, 48-year-old Paslo Periene, 32-year-old Caroline Peruine and Carl Kroeger.

The hotel was later managed by Johann Heinrich Gerhard Klipsch. The building was home to two households at the 1860 census. Johann Heinrich Gerhard Klipsch resided in the building with his wife Johanne Christine Emilie Klipsch (née Jansen), their three children (aged two to 22), one male caretaker, two maids (associated with the hotel) and three lodgers. Heinrich Frederik Müller, a master shoemaker, resided in the building with his wife Wilhelmine Müller f. Jacobsen, their four children (aged one to six), his wife's sister Elise Jacobsen and two apprentices.

=== Later history ===
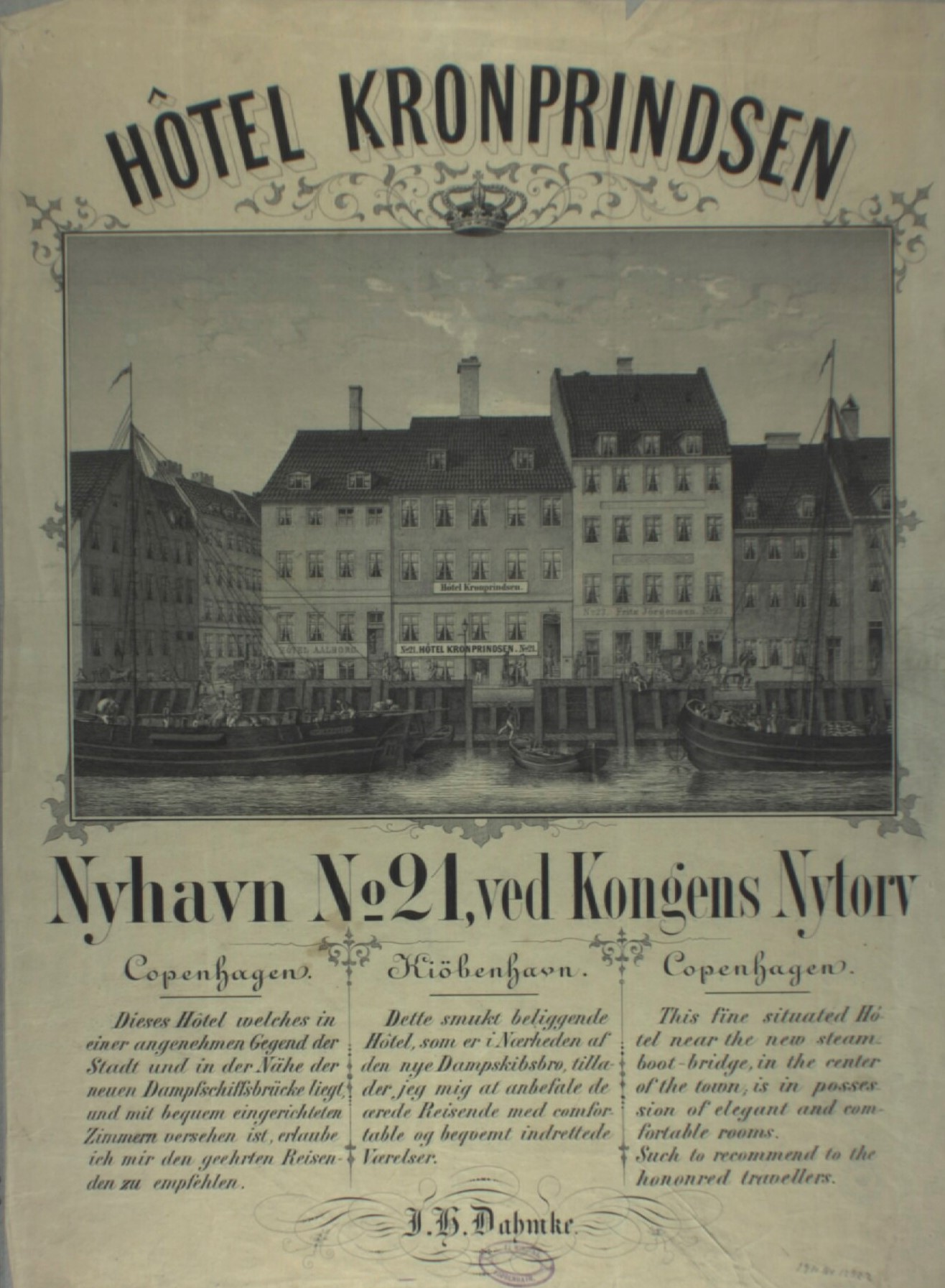
Hotel Kronprindsen

The Skagen painters Anna and Michael Ancher resided in the building when they visited Copenhagen. The address is thus frequently seen in Charlottenborg Exhibition catalogues from the time.

The name of the hotel was later changed to Hotel Kronprinsen. The hotel existed until at least the 1960s. The bar in the basement was operated under the name Cap Horn from at least 1930. The politician Jens Christian Christensen resided at Nyhavn 21 from 1895 to 1899.

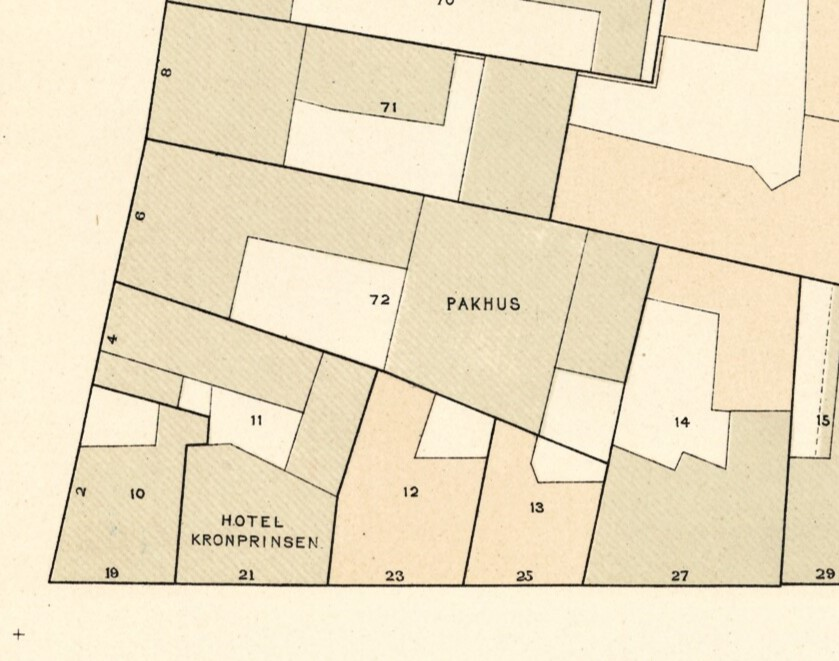
Hotel Kronprinsen seen in a detail from one of Berggreen's block plans of St. Ann's East Quarter, 1775–1999

The building was used as a hiding place for members of the resistance movement during World War II.

Cap Horn was a popular jazz venue in the 1950s. Papa Bue's Viking Jazz Band was founded and played their concert in Cap Horn in 1956.

The weaver and political activist Lise Plum purchased the building in the 1980s. Fredsfonden and Økologifonden was from then on based in the building. She turned Cap Gorn into Denmark's first organic restaurant. The restaurant was from 1991 continued by her daughter Camilla Plum. The building was sold in 1996. The new owner was Peter Tholstryp (1932–2009), a well-known restaurateur who already owned a number of restaurants on Gråbrødretorv and in Nyhavn.

== Architecture ==
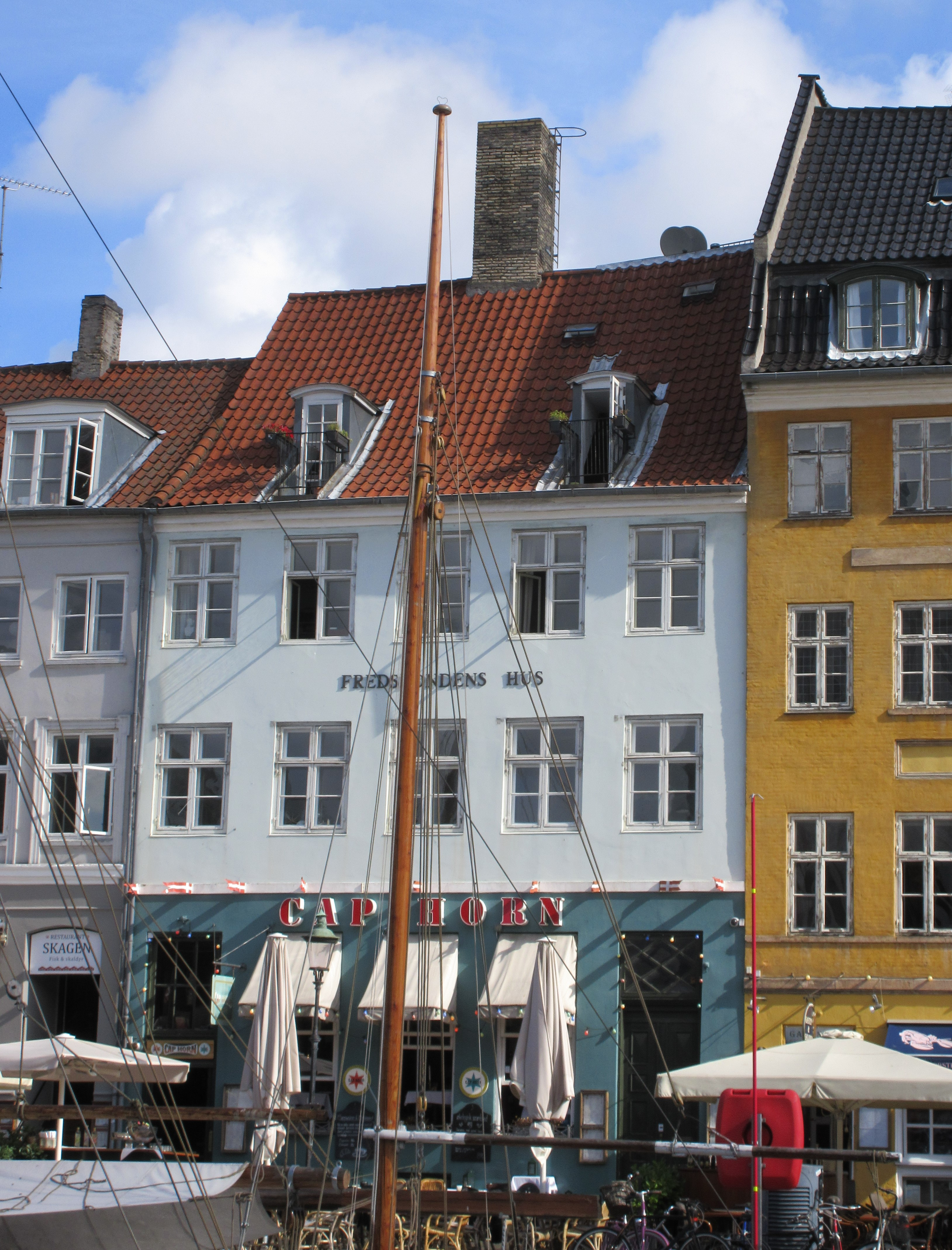
Nyhavn 21

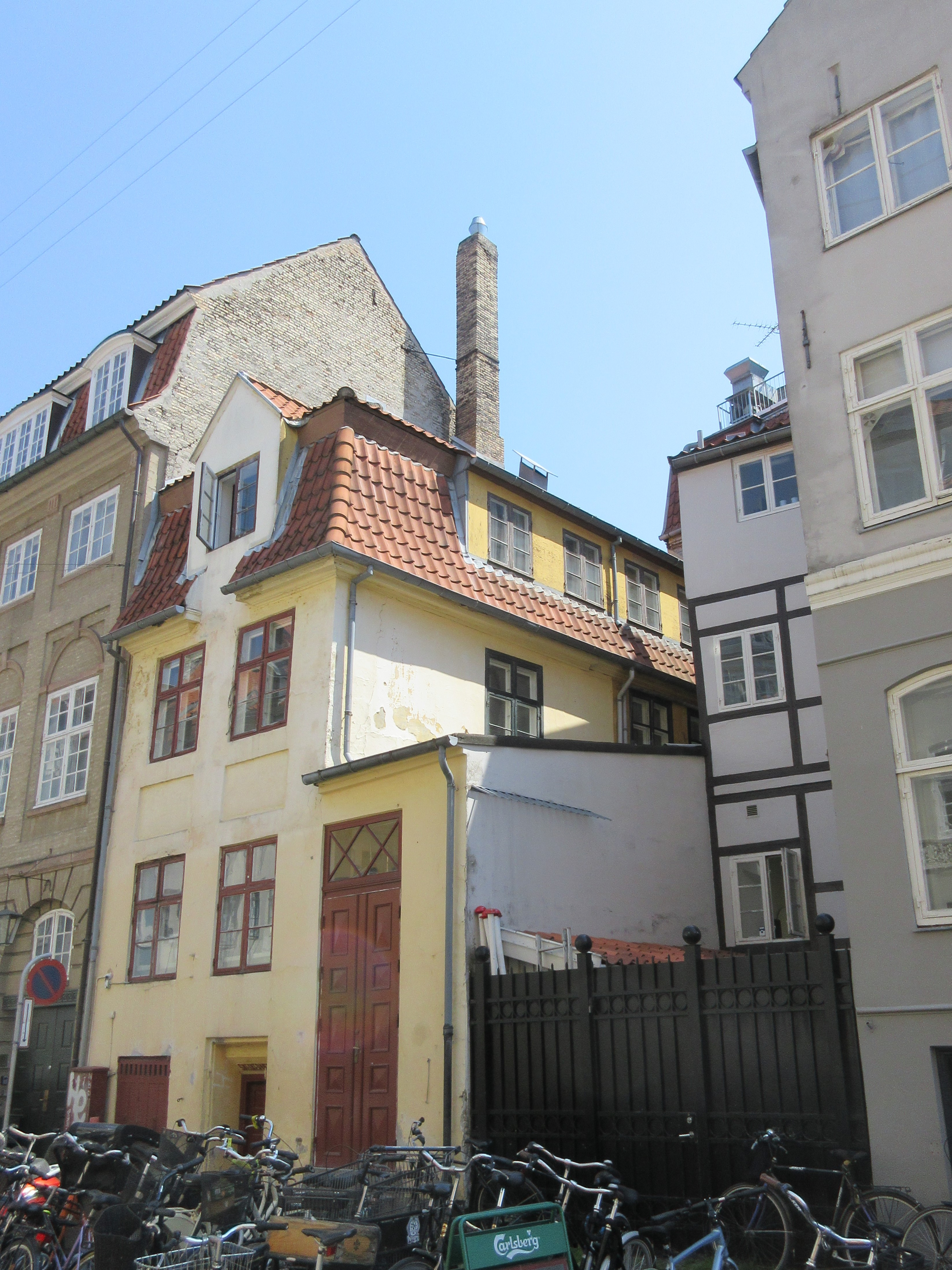
Lille Strandstræde 4

Nyhavn 21 is constructed in brick with three storeys over a walk-out basement. The five-bays wide facade towards Nyhavn is plastered and painted in a light blue colour on the upper floors. A green-painted door is located in each of the two outer bays. The pitched red tile roof is pierced by a robust chimney.

A parallel two-storey rear wing from 1748 is located on the other side of a small courtyard. The two buildings are attached to each other via a staircase building from 1850 along the east side of the courtyard. The courtyard has now been covered by a roof, integrating it with the ground floor of the building.

The just two-bays-wide, two-storey building at Lille Strandstræde 4 was constructed as an extension of the rear wing. It has a red mansard roof. The single-storey extension with the main entrance dates from 1843.

== Today ==
The property is still owned by the Tholstrup restaurant group.
