= Viggo Johansen =

Danish painter (1851–1935)

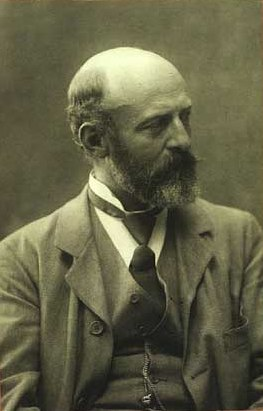
- Viggo Johansen photographed by Peter Newland
- Born: 3 January 1851; Copenhagen, Denmark
- Died: 18 December 1935 (aged 84); Copenhagen. Denmark
- Education: Royal Danish Academy of Fine Arts
- Known for: Painting

Viggo Johansen (3 January 1851 – 18 December 1935) was a Danish painter and active member of the group of Skagen Painters who met every summer in the north of Jutland. He was one of Denmark's most prominent painters in the 1890s.

== Early life and education ==
As a boy, Johansen already had a talent for drawing which was recognized by Wilhelm Marstrand. He studied at the Royal Danish Academy of Fine Arts from 1868 to 1875, specializing in figure painting, but did not pass the graduation examination.

== Career ==
His earliest works are from Hornbæk where he painted between 1872 and 1876 with works such as Et Maaltid and Nabokonens Besøg.

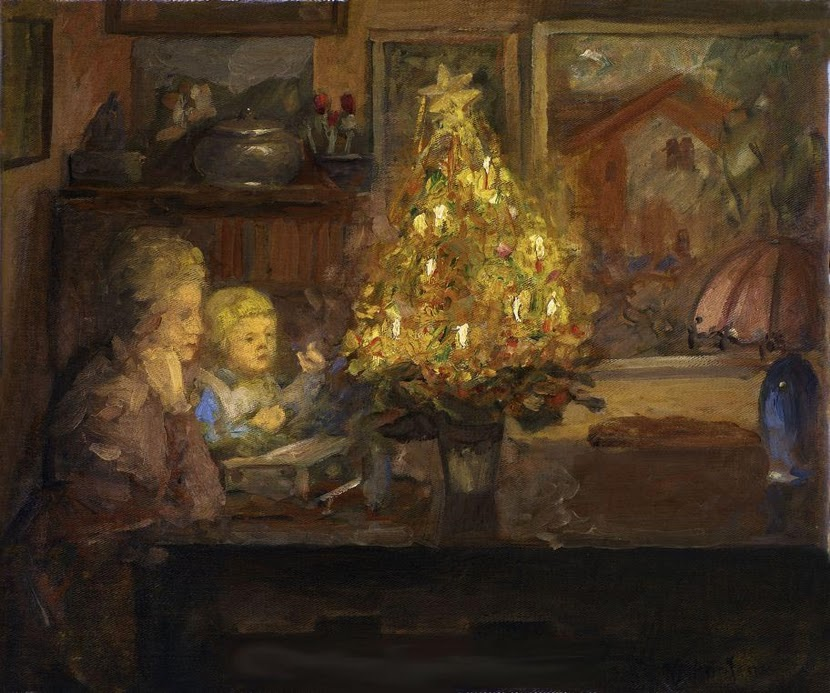
A Christmas Story

He first became associated with the Skagen Painters in 1875, encouraged by his fellow students Karl Madsen and Michael Ancher.

From 1885, he exhibited in Paris; there he was inspired by Claude Monet, particularly in his use of colour as can be seen in his painting Christian Bindslev er syg (Christian Bindslev is ill, 1890), which also shows the influence of Christian Krohg, one of the other Skagen painters. After his return from Paris, his paintings took on lighter tones; he had noted the absence of black in the works of the French artists and considered his own earlier works too dark by comparison. Nevertheless, Johansen is remembered particularly for the subdued lighting effects of his interiors — many of which were painted after his visit to Paris — as in his Glade jul (Merry Christmas, 1891), (Note: Gauguin visited Skagen while Johansen was painting Merry Christmas and tried to encourage him to make the tree brighter, even going as far as to produce a pastel drawing to convey the idea, but Johansen "did not think there was much sense in what he sketched".) Aftenpassiar (Evening Talk, 1886) and Aftenselskab i kunstnerens hjem (Evening Gathering at the Artist's Home, 1899) and his scenes of domestic family life, but he also painted landscapes (at Skagen, at Tisvilde, and at his childhood home, the fishing port of Dragør outside Copenhagen), still lifes and portraits. After a falling out with P.S. Krøyer in 1891, Johansen's relationship with the Anchers was strained and he and his family did not visit Skagen for several years.

From 1888 to 1906, he taught at the Artists Academy's School for Women. He then became a professor there until 1920 and, for a time, was one of its directors.

== Private life ==
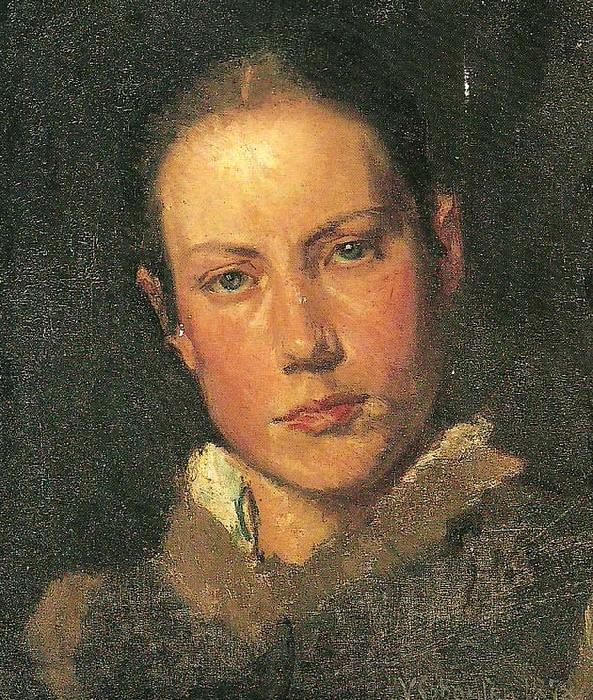
Martha, the artist's wife, painting by Viggo Johansen

It is said that in Skagen, he showed just as much interest in playing Mozart on the hotel piano or Gluck on the church organ as in painting. He married Anna Ancher's cousin Martha Møller in 1880. Martha often served as a model, for example in Køkkeninteriør (Kitchen interior, 1884) — which may have been inspired by Anna Ancher's similarly composed The Girl in the Kitchen — Sovekammerscene (Bedroom Scene, 1885) and Børnene vaskes (Washing the Children, 1888) which were painted partially on the basis of photographs.

Viggo Johansen's sister Helga was a novelist. His daughter, Ellen, was also a painter. She married the painter Johannes Ottesen.

== Awards ==
In 1886, Johansen was awarded the Exhibition Medal for the painting Evening Talk. In 1889, many of the Skagen artists received awards at Exposition Universelle in Paris; Johansen won a Gold Medal for Børnene vaskes.

== Gallery ==
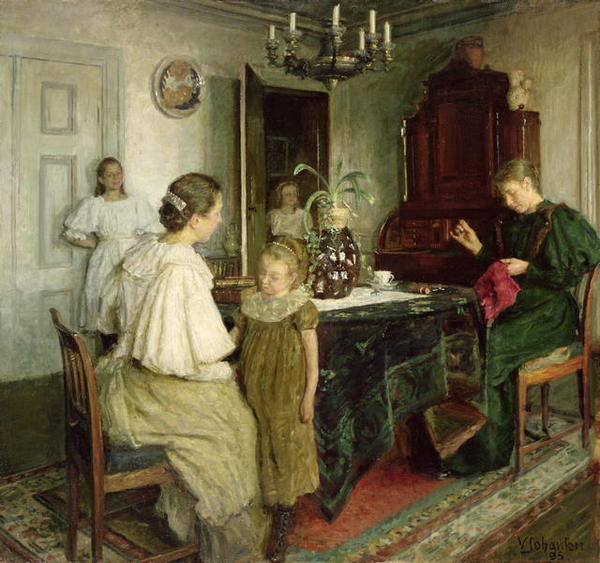
The Artist's Family

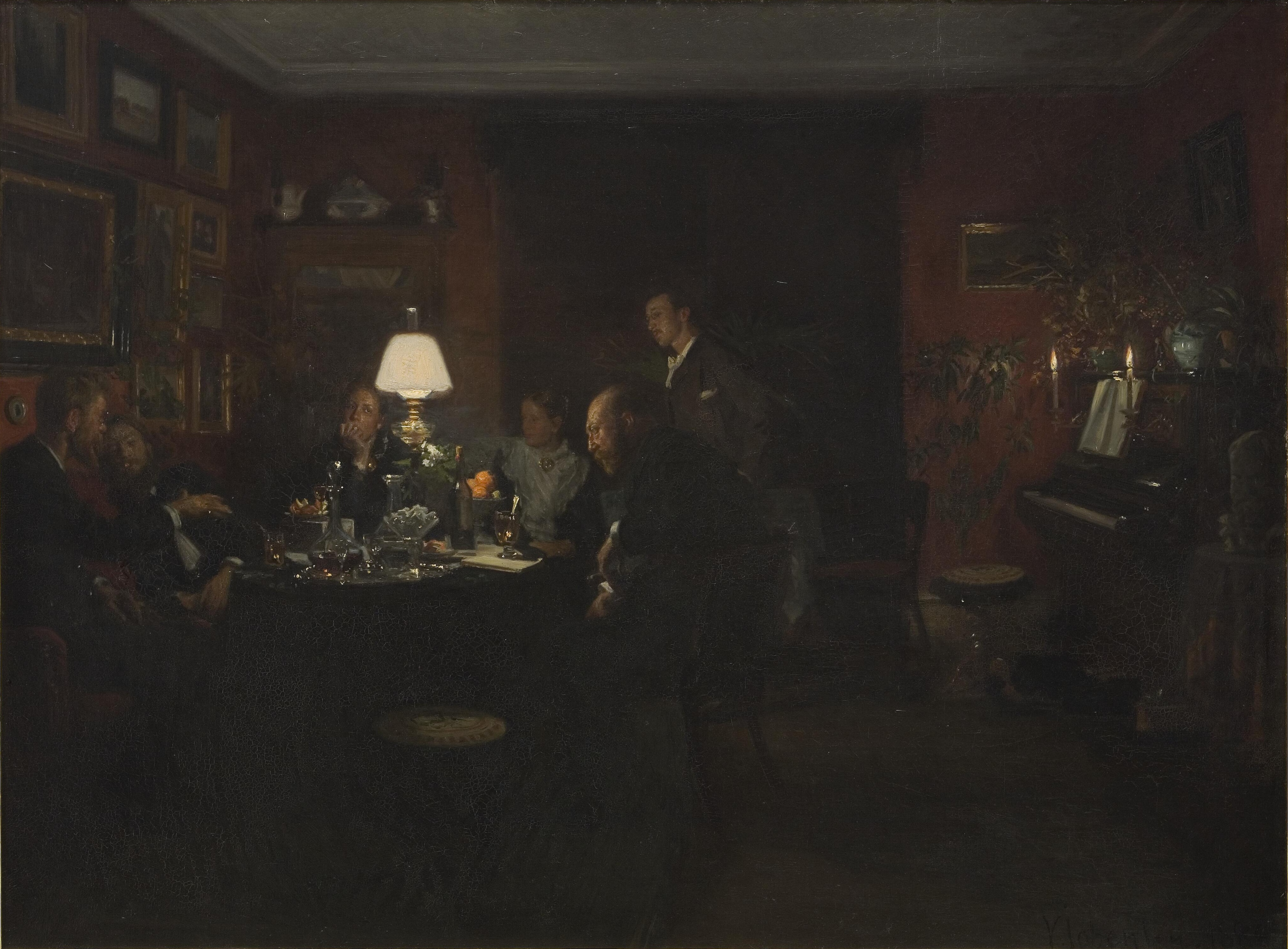
Evening Talk (1886)

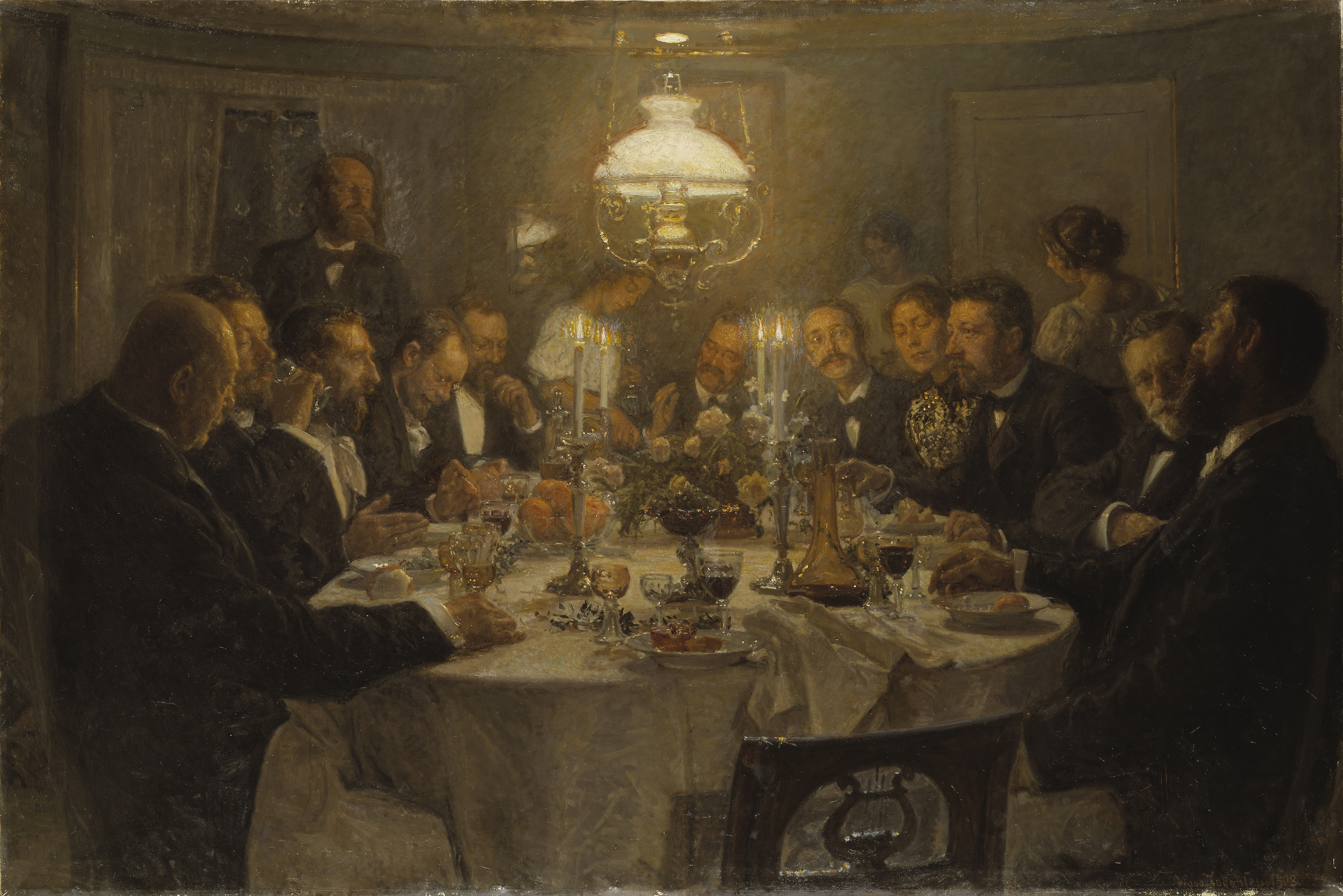
An Artists' Gathering (1903)

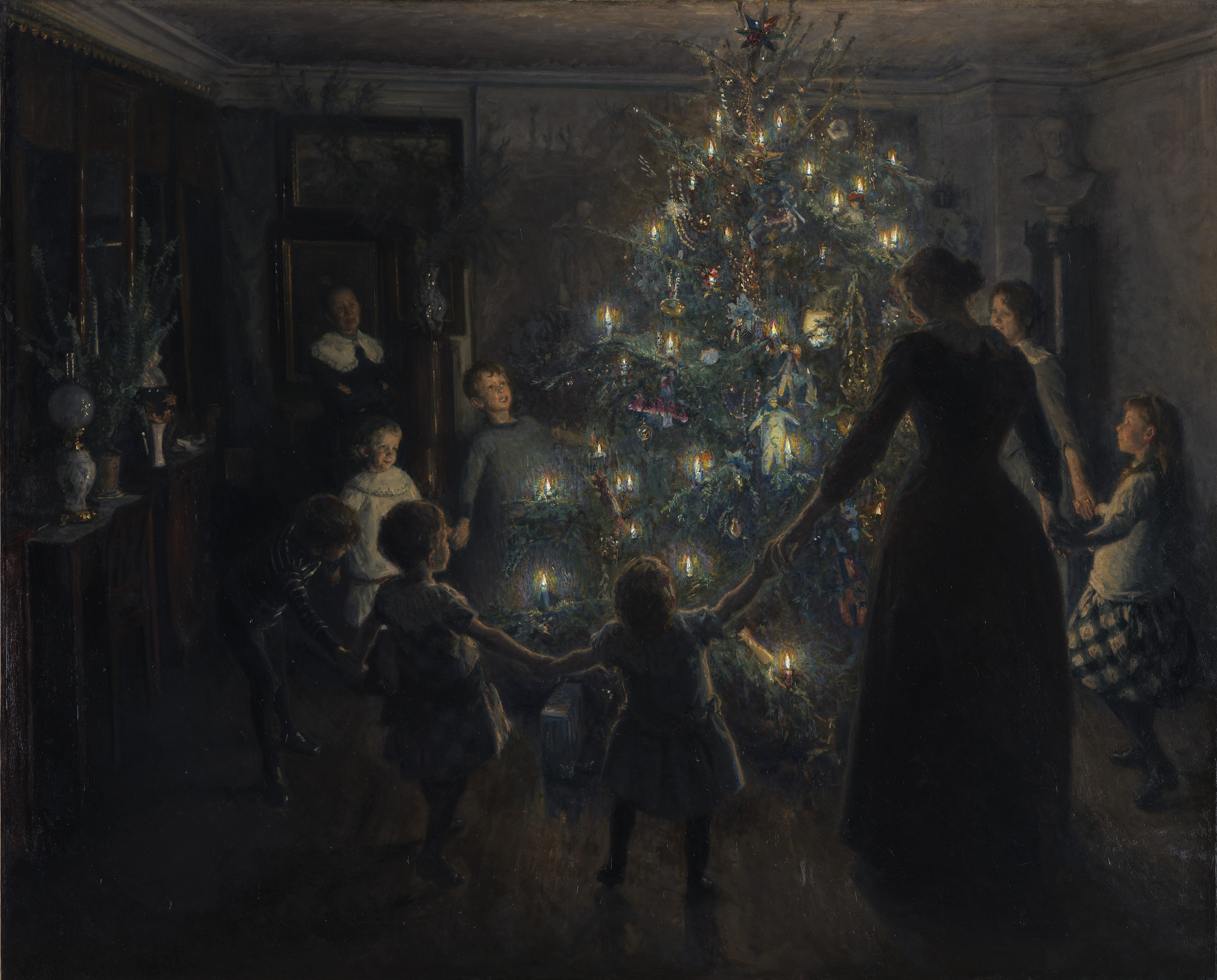
Merry Christmas (1891)

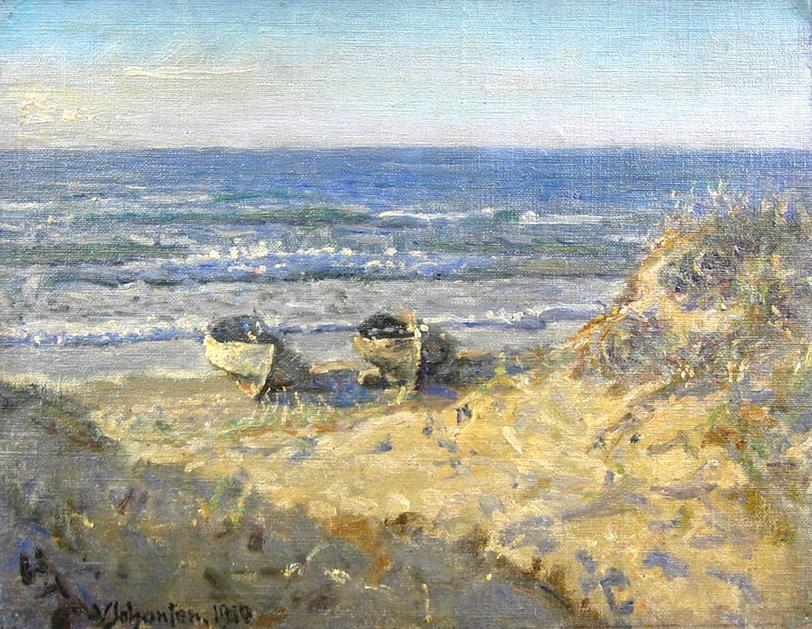
Boats in Skagen on Sonderstrand Beach (1910)

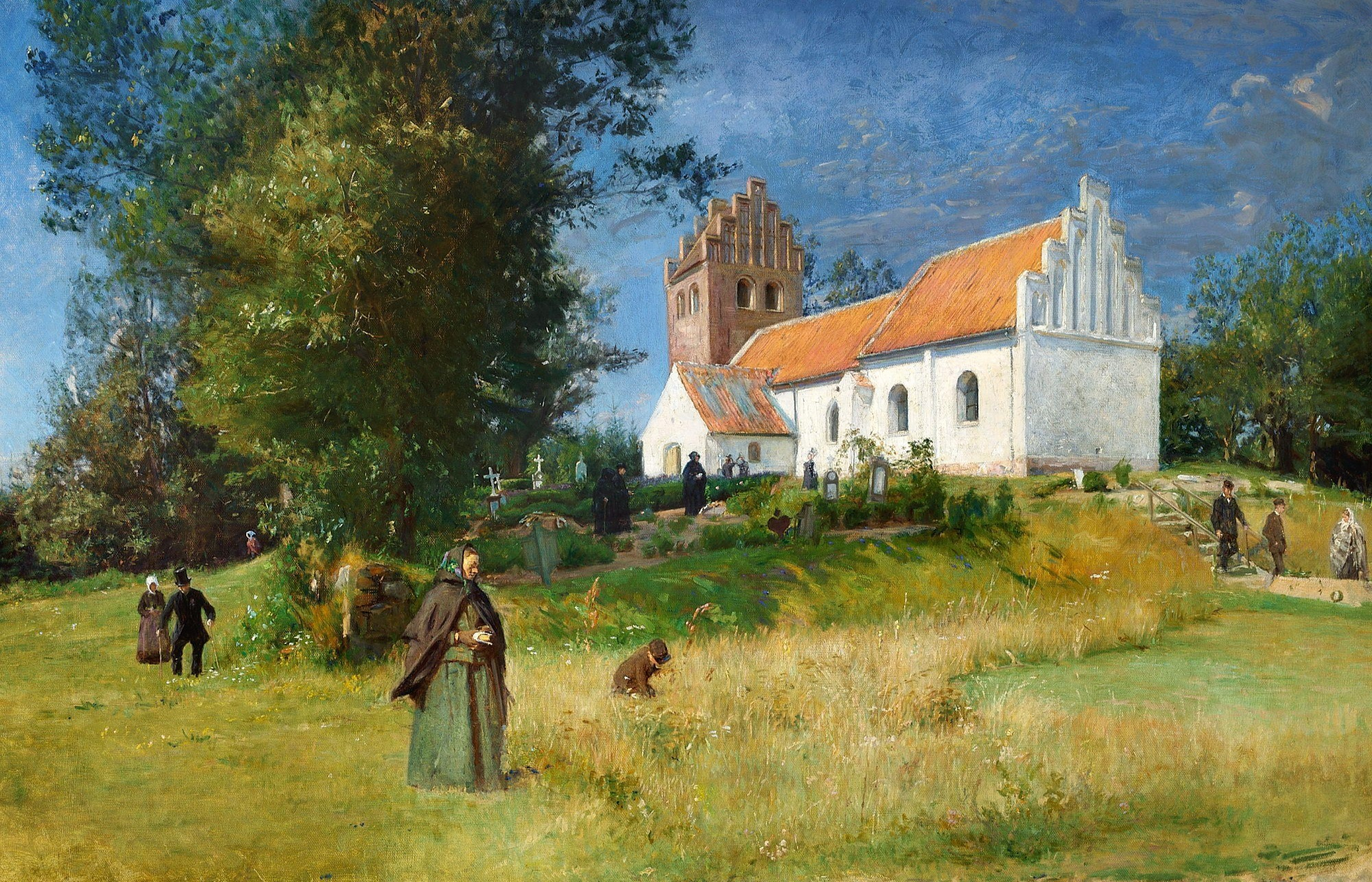
Tibirke Church

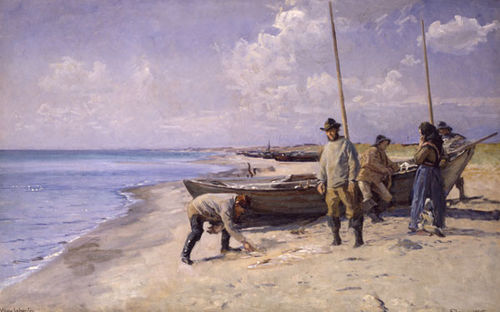
Dividing the Catch

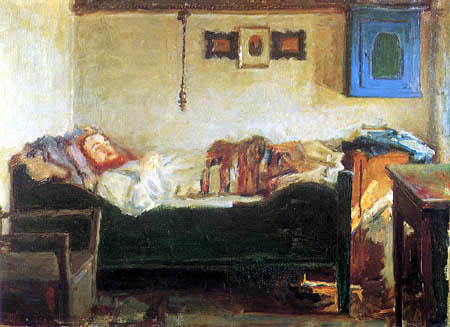
Christian Bindslev is Ill (1889)
