= Karl Frederik Kinch =

Danish archaeologist

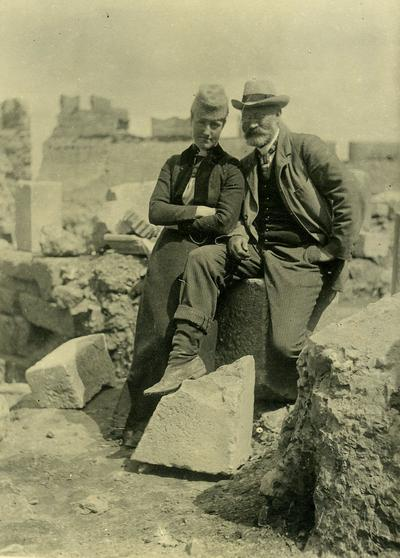
- K. F. Kinch and his wife Helvig Kinch in 1903
- Born: 15 March 1853; Ribe, Denmark
- Died: 26 August 1921 (aged 68); Copenhagen, Denmark
- Education: University of Copenhagen
- Occupation: Archaeologist
- Spouse: Helvig Amsinck (m. 1903)

Karl Frederik Kinch (15 March 1853 – 26 August 1921) was a Danish archaeologist and classical philologist. He explored and recorded monuments and tombs in Macedonia during the 1880s and 1890s, recording important archaeological finds before time and looters damaged them. He participated in excavations at Lindos and Vroulia on the island of Rhodes from 1902 to 1914.

== Early life ==
Karl Frederik (K. F.) Kinch was born in 1853 in Ribe to his mother Bertine Kinch and his father Jakob Frederik Kinch, an author and historian. He had many siblings; his father had 15 children over two wives. Karl Frederik received a good education at the University of Copenhagen and studied under Johan Louis Ussing, a professor of philology and archeology there. Kinch acquired his PhD in 1883 with a thesis on Quintus Curtius Rufus. Initially, he searched for a job that would put his philology to use and tutored Latin and French to children of wealthy families, but he couldn't find a permanent position. Instead, he traveled during the 1880s and early 1890s.

== Macedonian excursions ==
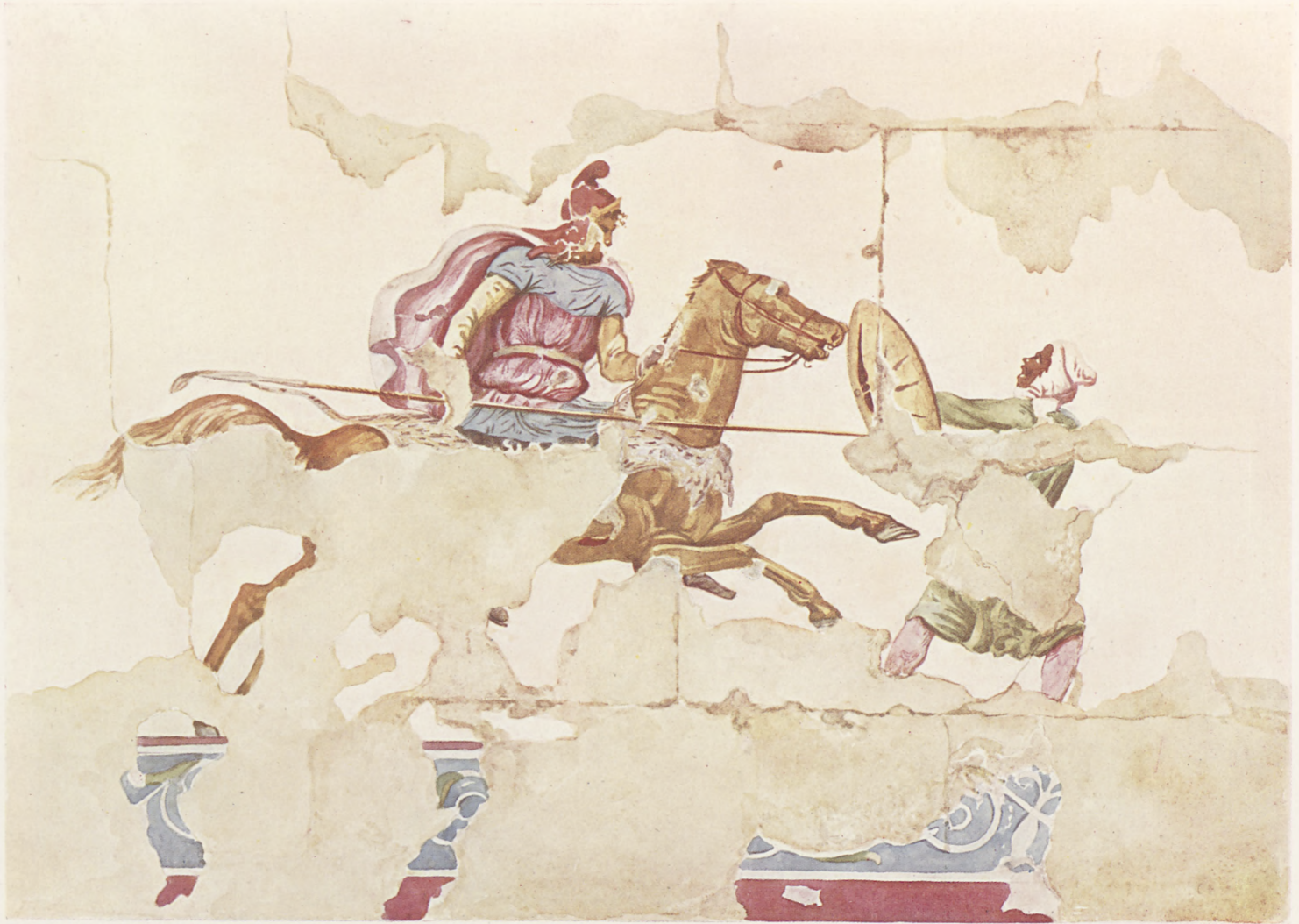
A painting by Kinch's friend Oscar Willerup, published by Kinch in 1920, of the interior of a tomb at Naousa ("Kinch's tomb") depicting a Macedonian cavalryman wielding a spear (perhaps a sarissa or a xyston?). The opponent might be a Persian. Kinch dated the painting to around 325–300 BCE. Kinch found the tomb in his travels in 1883–1895; the original painting was later destroyed, so Kinch's recreation is all that remains.

In particular, he visited the lands of the Kingdom of Greece as well as Asia Minor. He arrived in Athens in October 1894. In Athens, he learned from other archaeologists that knowledge of Macedonia (then part of the Salonica vilayet of the Ottoman Empire) was lacking. Kinch made a special focus of the peninsula Chalkidiki, then a dangerous place threatened by bandits. Kinch traveled through the region five times (Note: Specifically, Kinch's Macedonian expeditions were in late 1885–August 1887, 1888, 1889, October 1891–April 1892, and 1893.) visited Macedonia as the first Danish archaeologist to do so, recorded various ancient inscriptions he found there, and published them. Among his travels in Chalkidiki was a site he (correctly) believed to be of the ancient city of Olynthus (although this would only be confirmed many decades later with the work of David Moore Robinson), as well as finding and identifying the location of Stagira, the birthplace of Aristotle. He published L'arc de triomphe de Salonique in 1890 describing a Roman-era monument found in the city of Thessaloniki, near the Egnatia Odos, which he identified as a 4th-century (~300 CE) work in honor of Roman Emperor Galerius. His work was convincing, and the arch has since been known as the Arch of Galerius. (Note: Strictly speaking, Kinch was not the first to say that the Arch was dedicated to Galerius, but earlier suggestions it was to Galerius had left it as speculation; Kinch was the first to lay out the evidence and convincingly argue the case.) As the arch was in substantially better shape in the 1880s than in later years, Kinch's work is relied upon for information about parts of the arch since damaged.

Kinch was the first to describe and define Macedonian chamber tombs, distinguished by their vaulted roof, ornate façade, and Doric frieze above the entrance. Since his publications, around 100 other similar chamber tombs have been discovered by other archaeologists such as Alan Wace, all matching his description. One find of particular importance was a tomb at Naousa, called "Kinch's Tomb". He was told about the tomb by villagers in 1887, and returned in 1889 and 1890 to make detailed study of it. There, he recorded a painting of a Macedonian cavalryman. The tomb was later greatly damaged by the opening of a railway line, leaving Kinch and his artist friend Oscar Willerup's recreation the only surviving record of the painting. Kinch presented the resulting picture to a philological meeting in 1892, but Kinch and Willerup's record did not receive wide awareness of its significance until it was published decades later in 1920. Kinch remained on good terms with his former teacher, as Professor Ussing had also traveled Greece in his youth in the Thessaly region. Kinch wrote an article in a festschrift dedicated to Ussing on a small Byzantine village church near Thessaloniki. Kinch's findings were that the church had been constructed by Euthymius the Younger around 870 CE as an imitation of the Church of the Holy Apostles in Constantinople.

From 1895–98, Kinch returned to Denmark, where he worked as a director at Mariboe's School in Copenhagen.

== Excavations at Rhodes ==
Kinch worked with the Carlsberg Foundation to select a potentially fruitful site for a new archaeological expedition, visiting both Smyrna and Cyrene in the Eastern Mediterranean in 1900 to 1901. He eventually selected Lindos on the island of Rhodes after some exploratory visits to the region. In the period 1902–1914, together with the Danish archaeologist Christian Blinkenberg, he was head of excavations at Lindos. During this period, Kinch met the draftswoman Helvig Amsinck, a Danish artist who came to work on the Lindos project. The two married on 10 May 1903, and would have a daughter, Gunhild, in 1904. Helvig would illustrate much of her husband's work and findings.

Kinch's work moved toward Vroulia on the southern end of Rhodes in 1907. One of the notable finds at Lindos was the Lindian Temple Chronicle. Kinch became a member of the Royal Danish Academy of Sciences and Letters in 1913. The start of World War I seems to have prompted Kinch to return home, with him arriving in Copenhagen by 27 August 1914; Ottoman entry into World War I in November 1914 made the prospect of a return to the Aegean Sea region impossible. Kinch organized and published some of his findings from Denmark. Kinch's final years were troubled by illness, and he died on 26 August 1921. His wife Helvig considerably outlived him, surviving until 1956.

== Legacy ==
Kinch's efforts in the field led to him being called a "pioneering archaeologist" in one 2018 book on Macedonia. Bente Kiilerich wrote that Kinch's analysis of the Arch of Galerius was pioneering and a "groundbreaking work". However, in his own era, Kinch was not prominent. Kinch's career involved intensive and grueling field work. While he was published and eventually became a member of the expected learned societies, this was late in his life, and he never held a permanent university or museum position. The academic circles of his day do not appear to have considered him a significant scholar; his reputation only improved later, with Blinkenberg's publications of the Lindos findings. One of his most significant findings, the artwork he arranged of "Kinch's Tomb" with Oscar Willerup, was only widely available a year before his death with his 1920 journal article.

While most of Kinch's writings were published in French and German so as to reach a wider audience, he also was one of the only scholars to publish a significant work in the Danish language on Macedonian history for many years in his 1891 work Erindringer fra Makedonien ("Memories from Macedonia").

== Selected works ==
- Quaestiones Curtianae criticae. (1883) (ebook)
- Observations Sur Les Noms Attribués a Des Graveurs De Monnaies Grecques (1889), in Revue Numismatique, pages 473-501 (ebook)
- L'arc de triomphe de Salonique (1890) (scan)
- Erindringer fra Makedonien (1891), in Tilskueren, pages 444–472 (scan)
- Beretning om en arkæologisk Rejse i Makedonien (1893), in Forhandlinger paa det fjerde Nordiske filologmøde i København den 18-21 juli 1892, pages 101–117 (ebook)
- De hellenske Kolonier paa den makedonske Halvø (1894), in Festskrift til Vilhelm Thomsen fra disciple (ebook)
- En Byzantiske Kirke in Festskrift til J.L. Ussing i anledning af hans 80-aarige fødselsdag, pages 144–156 (scan)
- Fouilles de Vroulia (Rhodes) (with Helvig Kinch, illustrations, and Christian Blinkenberg) (1914) (PDF, HathiTrust scan)
- Le Tombeau De Niausta: Tombeau Macédonien (1920) (PDF)
- (posthumously, by Christian Blinkenberg) Lindos. Fouilles et recherches, 1902-1914. Volume 1: Les petits objets. (1931)
- (posthumously, by Christian Blinkenberg) Lindos. Fouilles et recherches, 1902-1914. Volume 2: Inscriptions. (1941)
- (posthumously, by Christian Blinkenberg, edited by Ejnar Dyggve) Lindos. Fouilles et recherches, 1902-1914. Volume 3: Le sanctuaire d'Athana Lindia et l'architecture lindienne. (1960)

== Gallery ==
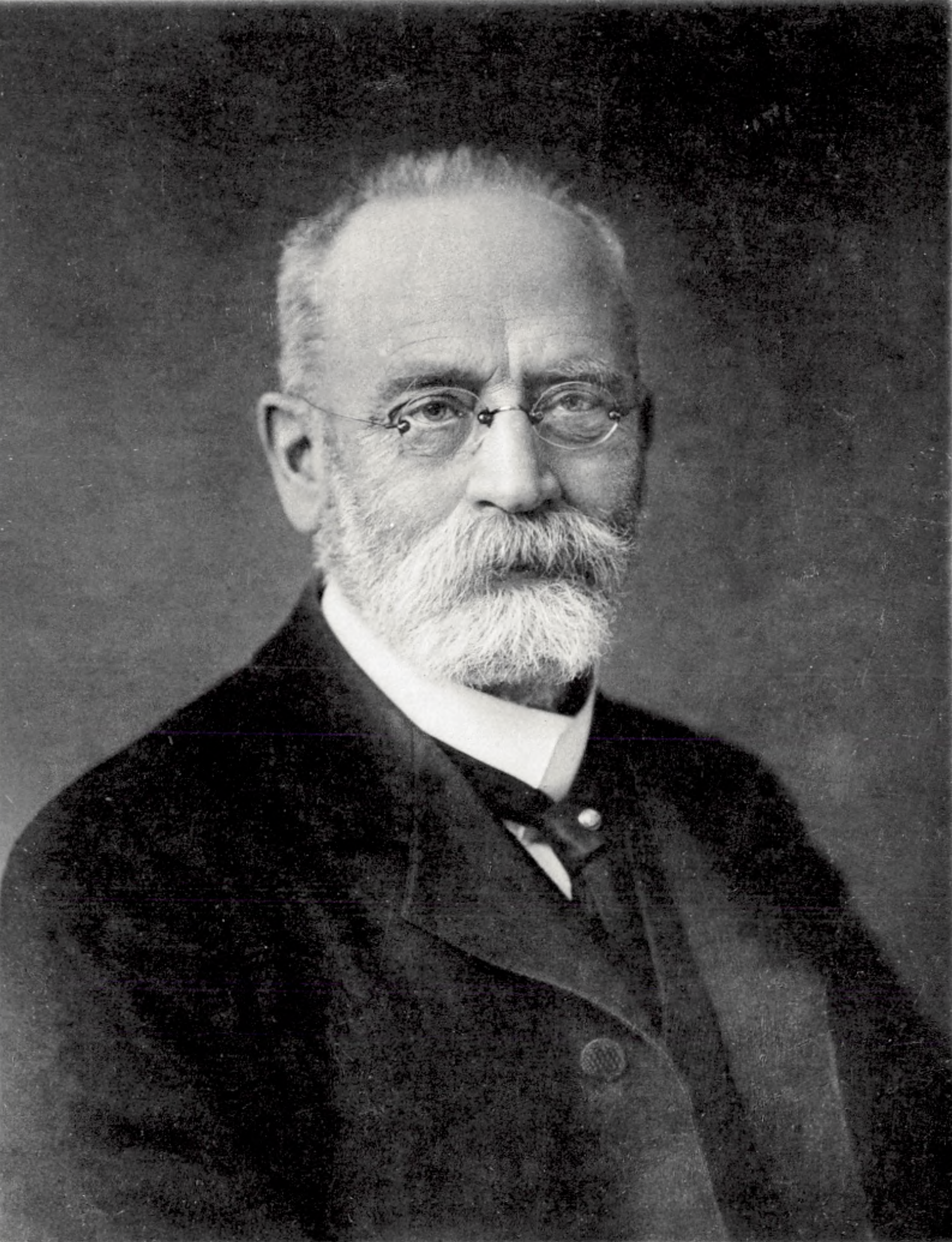
A photograph of an elderly Kinch by Julie Laurberg and Franziska Gad

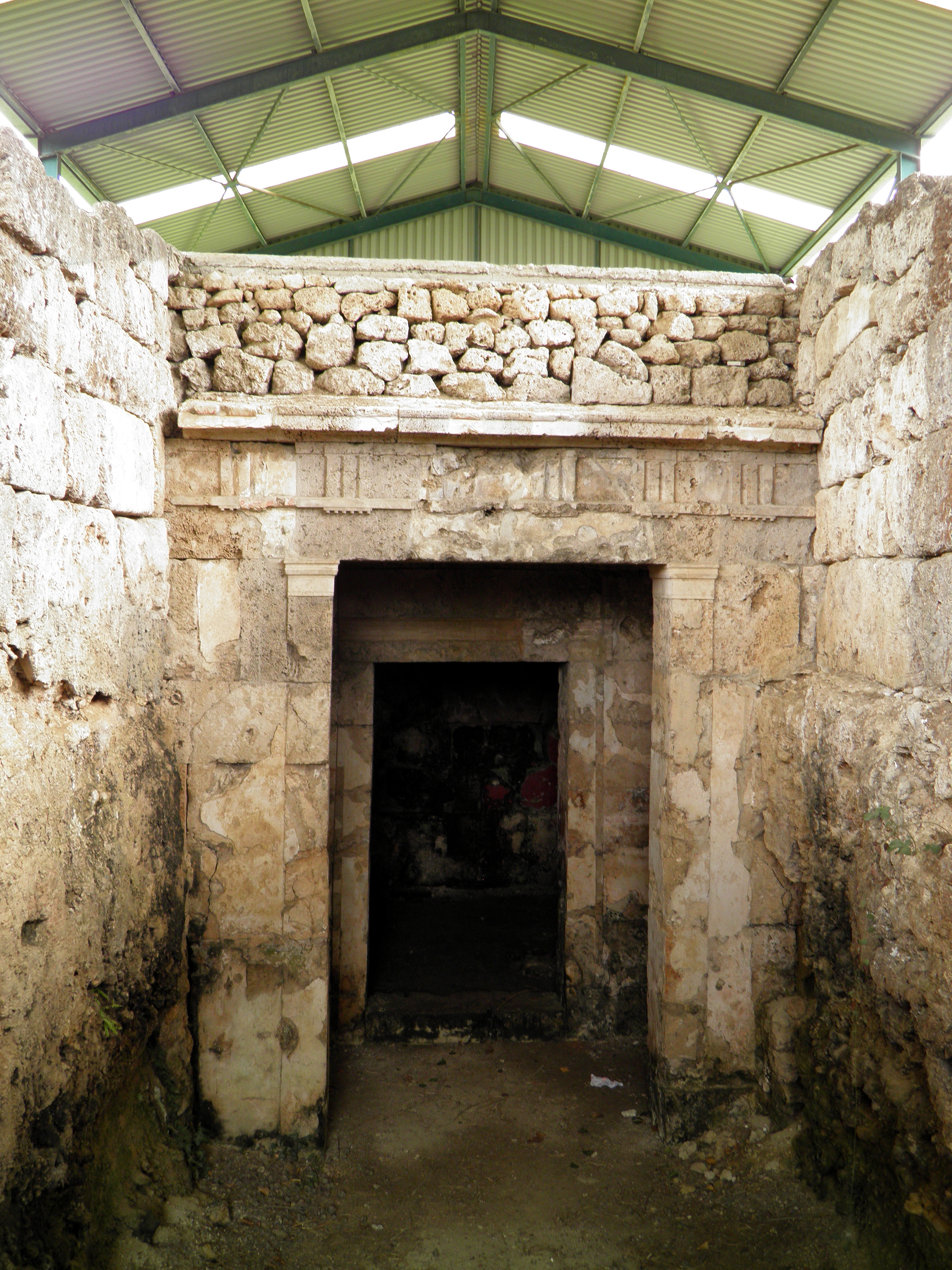
A modern photograph of "Kinch's tomb" near Mieza where Kinch said he found the cavalryman painting

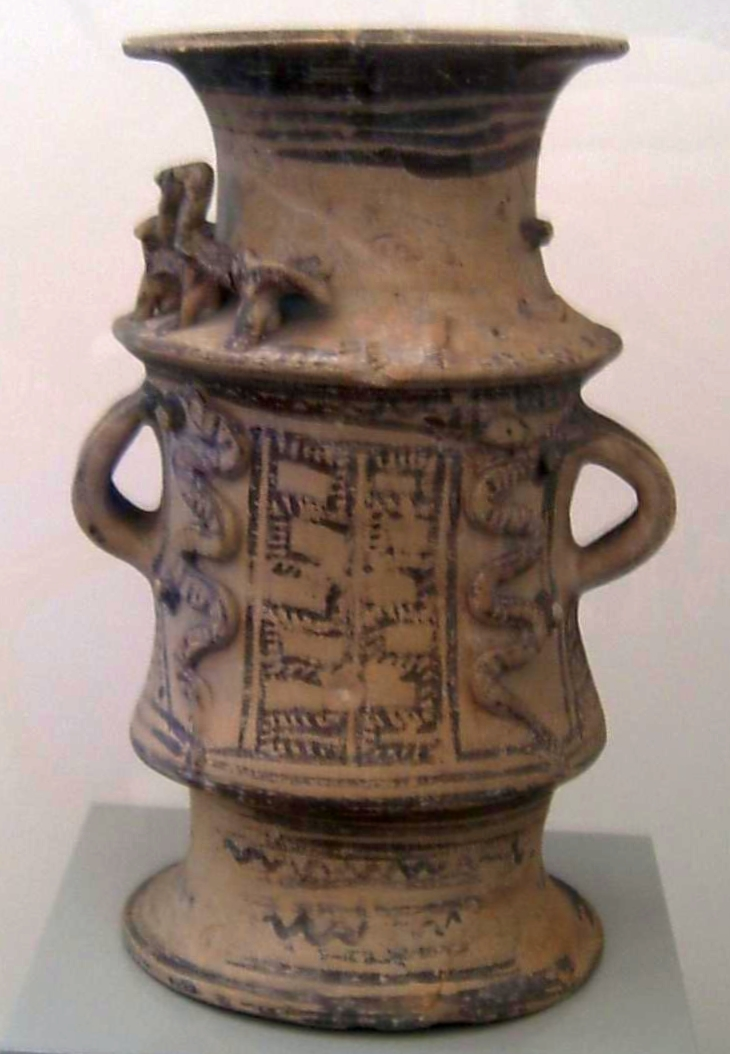
Eschara VI 4563, an eschara vessel found in Rhodes, and detailed in Kinch's 1914 work Fouilles de Vroulia (Rhodes). Probably dates to the 8th century BCE due to the late geometric style of pottery. Currently held at the Antikensammlung Berlin.

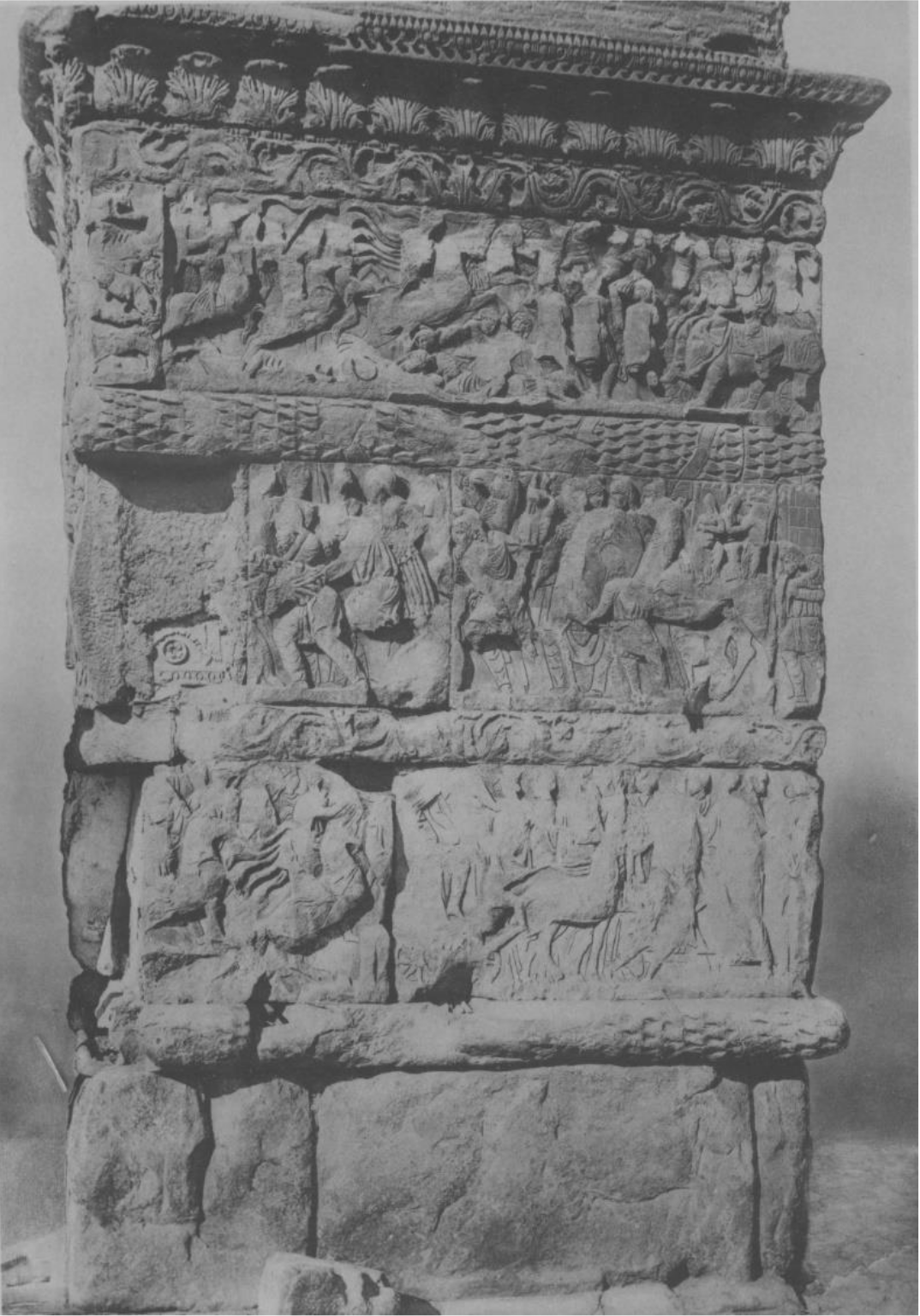
An image of the Arch of Galerius in Kinch's 1890 monograph

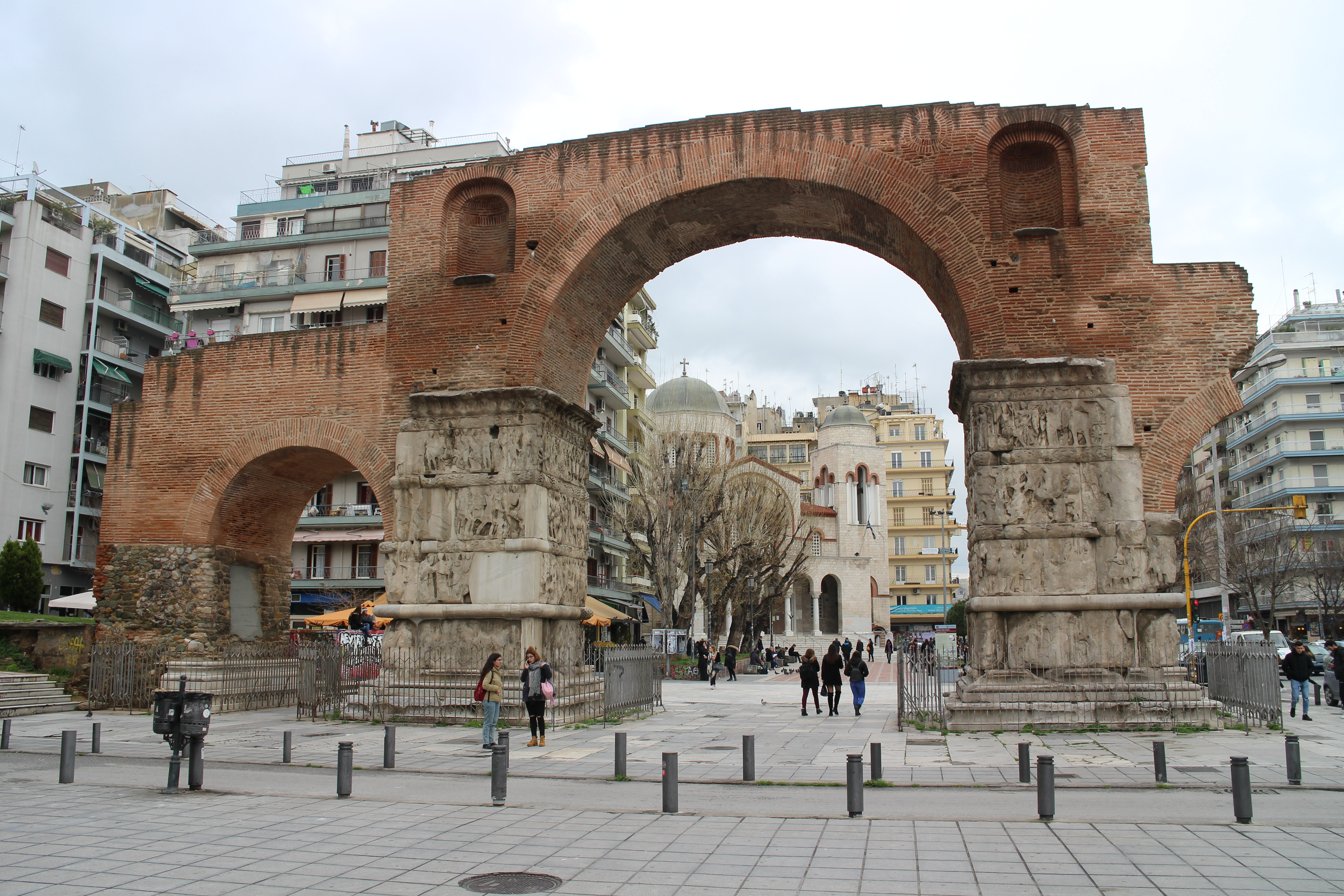
The Arch of Galerius in 2018
