= Hip, Hip, Hurrah! =

1888 painting by Peder Severin Krøyer

- Artist: Peder Severin Krøyer
- Year: 1888
- Medium: Oil-on-canvas
- Dimensions: 134.5 cm × 165.5 cm (53 in × 65 1/8 in)
- Location: Gothenburg Museum of Art

Hip, Hip, Hurrah! (Danish: Hip, hip, hurra! Kunstnerfest på Skagen, pronounced [ˈhip ˈhip huˈʁɑ ˈkʰɔnstnɐˌfest pʰɔ ˈskɛːˀjn̩], lit. 'Artists' Party at Skagen') is an oil-on-canvas painting from 1888 by Danish painter Peder Severin Krøyer.

== Description ==
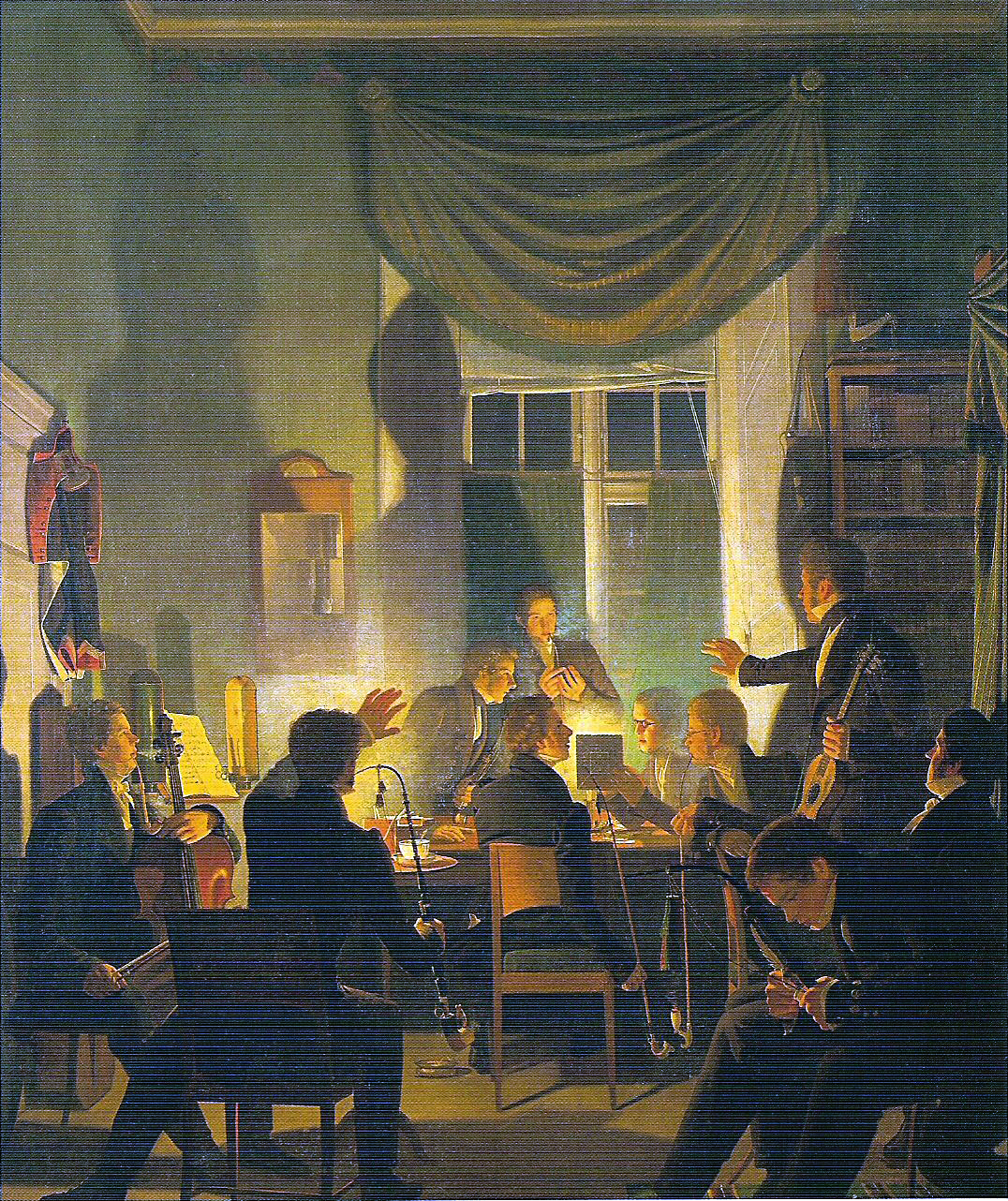
Tobaksselskab (Smoking Party), Wilhelm Bendz, 1828

The work shows various members of the Skagen Painters: a group of Danish, Norwegian and Swedish artists who formed a loose community in Skagen at the northern tip of Jutland in the 1880s and early 1890s. Hip, Hip, Hurrah! is typical of the work produced by the Skagen Painters; very much in the style of the French Impressionists and Naturalists, it celebrates the play of light in the scene (and in composition and subject draws obvious comparisons to Renoir's Luncheon of the Boating Party), but at the same time it harks back to the freundschaftbild tradition of artists of the Danish Golden Age such as Ditlev Blunck and Wilhelm Bendz in depicting artistic communities spontaneously drawing together. The development of Krøyer's Skagen style can be seen by comparing Hip, Hip, Hurrah! with Ved frokosten (Artists' Luncheon at Skagen), a similarly themed 1883 painting which features many of the same people; and with later works like Sommeraften ved Skagens strand. Kunstneren og hans hustru (Summer Evening at Skagen beach. The Artist and his Wife) and Roser (Roses).

From left to right the people pictured are: Martha Møller Johansen and her husband, the painter Viggo Johansen, Norwegian painter Christian Krohg, Krøyer, Degn Brøndum (Anna Ancher's brother), Michael Ancher, Swedish painter Oscar Björck, Danish painter Thorvald Niss, teacher Helene Christensen (who was romantically involved with Krøyer), Danish painter Anna Ancher and her daughter Helga Ancher.

== History ==
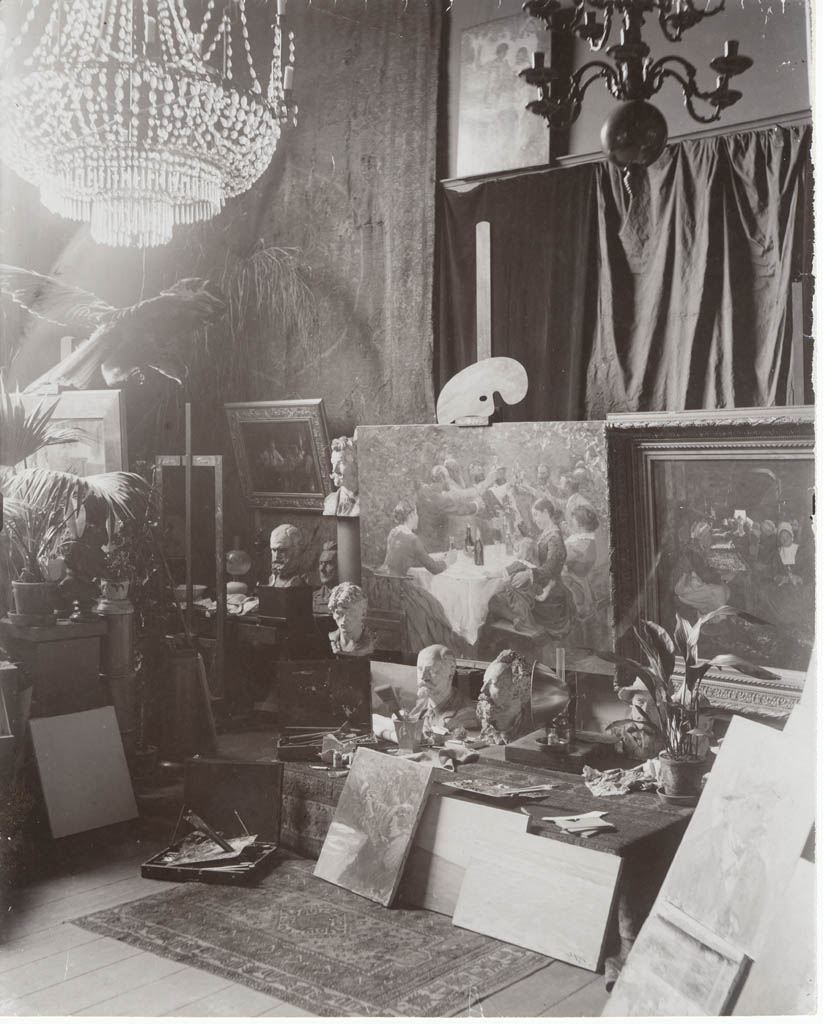
Hip, Hip, Hurrah! in Peder Severin Krøyer's studio before completion, before the older Helga Ancher was added.

The painting was started in 1884 after a party at Michael Ancher's house; the composition was inspired by photographs taken at the celebration by the German artist Fritz Stoltenberg, although the individuals featured are not all the same. Krøyer returned uninvited to Ancher's house the morning after the gathering with his easel and paints, eager to start sketching and expecting the freedom to come and go as he pleased. His lack of consideration annoyed Ancher, who had only recently moved to the house in an attempt to escape the hustle and bustle of town life; as a result, the two artists suffered their first serious falling-out. Although they reconciled soon afterwards, Krøyer did not get the unlimited access to Ancher's garden that he had expected and, frustrated, he struggled to progress with the work. He made do with the garden at Ancher's old apartment and worked from photographs and from life when he got the chance.

It was four years before he could complete the picture. Helga, Ancher's daughter, who had been less than a year old at the time of the original festivities, is shown to be older in the final painting, suggesting she was not included until later in the composition. A photograph of the painting in Krøyer's studio shows an earlier composition before the older Helga was added. Swedish art collector Pontus Fürstenberg bought the painting unseen (or at least before it was completed). It was displayed at Charlottenborg in 1888, and Fürstenberg later donated it to the Gothenburg Museum of Art, where it has hung ever since. The Skagens Museum has a small sketch from 1888.

== Cultural influence ==
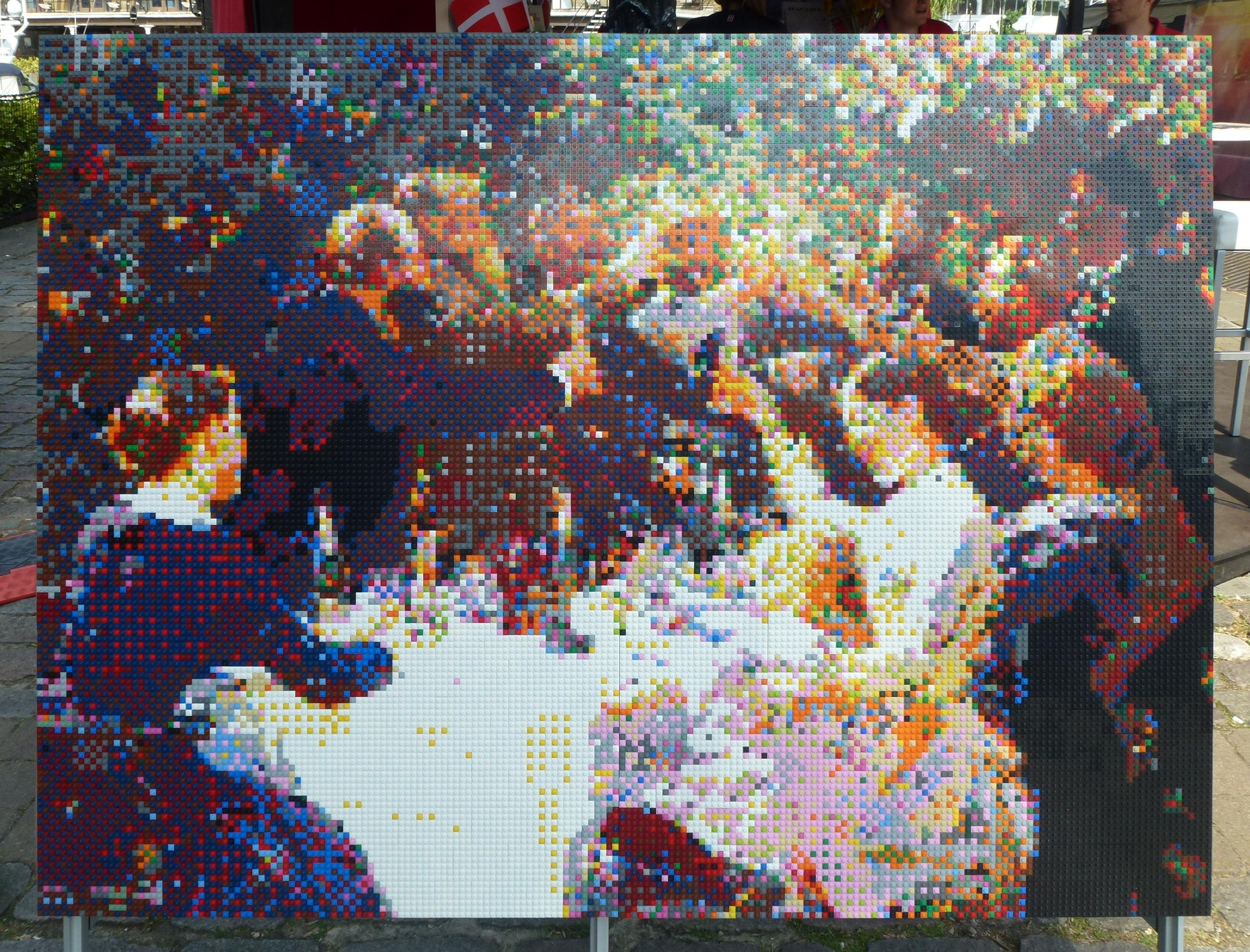
Hip, Hip, Hurrah! recreated in Lego

In August 2012, visitors and VisitDenmark staff recreated the painting at full scale out of Lego blocks at the IMAGINATION festival at St Katharine Docks, London, held in conjunction with the 2012 Summer Olympics. A stylized reproduction of the work hangs in the foyer of Consensus Systems (ConsenSys), at their world headquarters in Brooklyn, New York.

Hip, Hip, Hurrah! appears on a range of champagnes named after the northernmost Danish town where Krøyer and his artist friends gathered. The 'Skagen' limited-release range is produced by Champagne Yvonne Seier Christensen, located in Le Mesnil-sur-Oger on the Côte des Blancs, Champagne, France. The painting shows Krøyer and his Scandinavian artist friends celebrating with a champagne toast. Gothenburg Museum of Art gave permission for Hip, Hip, Hurrah! to appear on Skagen Champagne labels in 2021.

== European project ==
The painting has been the subject of a project funded by the European Regional Development Fund which led to a three-dimensional digital version of the painting being available for visitors to Skagens Museum next to the site where it was originally painted.

== See also ==
- List of paintings by Peder Severin Krøyer
