= The Artist's Mother Ane Hedvig Brøndum in the Red Room =

Painting by Anna Ancher

- Kunstnerens mor Ane Hedvig Brøndum i den røde stue (Danish)
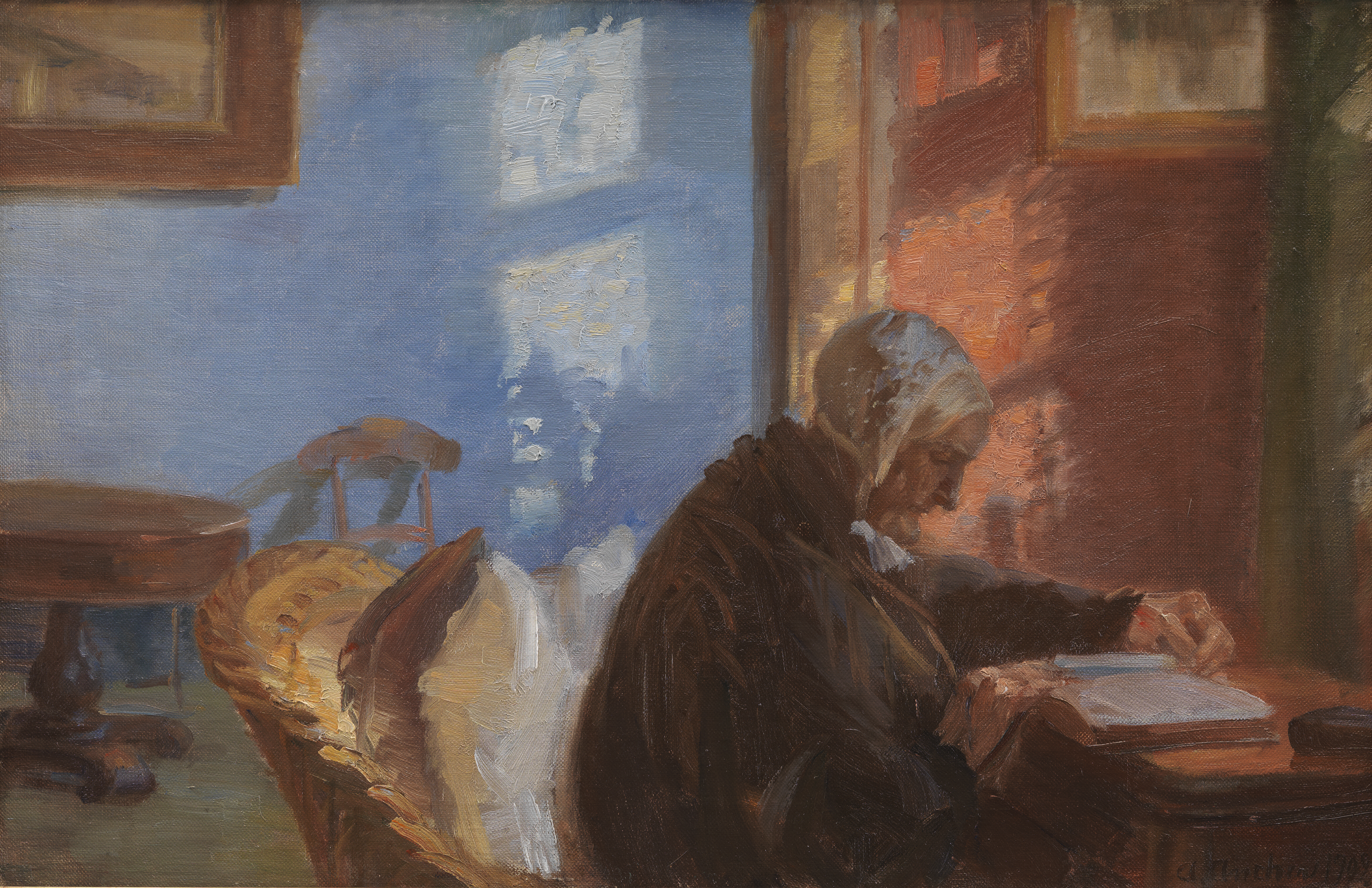
- Artist: Anna Ancher
- Year: 1909
- Medium: oil on canvas
- Dimensions: 38.8 cm × 56.8 cm (15.3 in × 22.4 in)
- Location: National Gallery of Denmark; Copenhagen

The artist's mother Ane Hedvig Brøndum in the red room (Danish: Kunstnerens mor Ane Hedvig Brøndum i den røde stue) is an oil on canvas painting by Danish painter Anna Ancher from 1909. It is held at the National Gallery of Denmark, in Copenhagen.

== Description ==
The painting is oil on canvas, and has dimensions of 38.8 x 56.8 cm.

== Analysis ==
Anna Ancher made several paintings of her mother, Anna Hedvig (Ane) Brøndum (1826-1916), who was married to merchant and innkeeper Erik Andersen Brøndum (1820–90). After her husband's death in 1890 she ran Brøndum's Hotel, with her son Degn Brøndum, until she was 70 years old. The portrait depicts Ane Hedvig in the red room with a view into the adjoining blue room at the hotel where she lived when at the time, and where she used to read. Several of Anna Ancher's portraits of her mother have the setting.

== Gallery ==
Ane Hedvig Brøndum, 1880

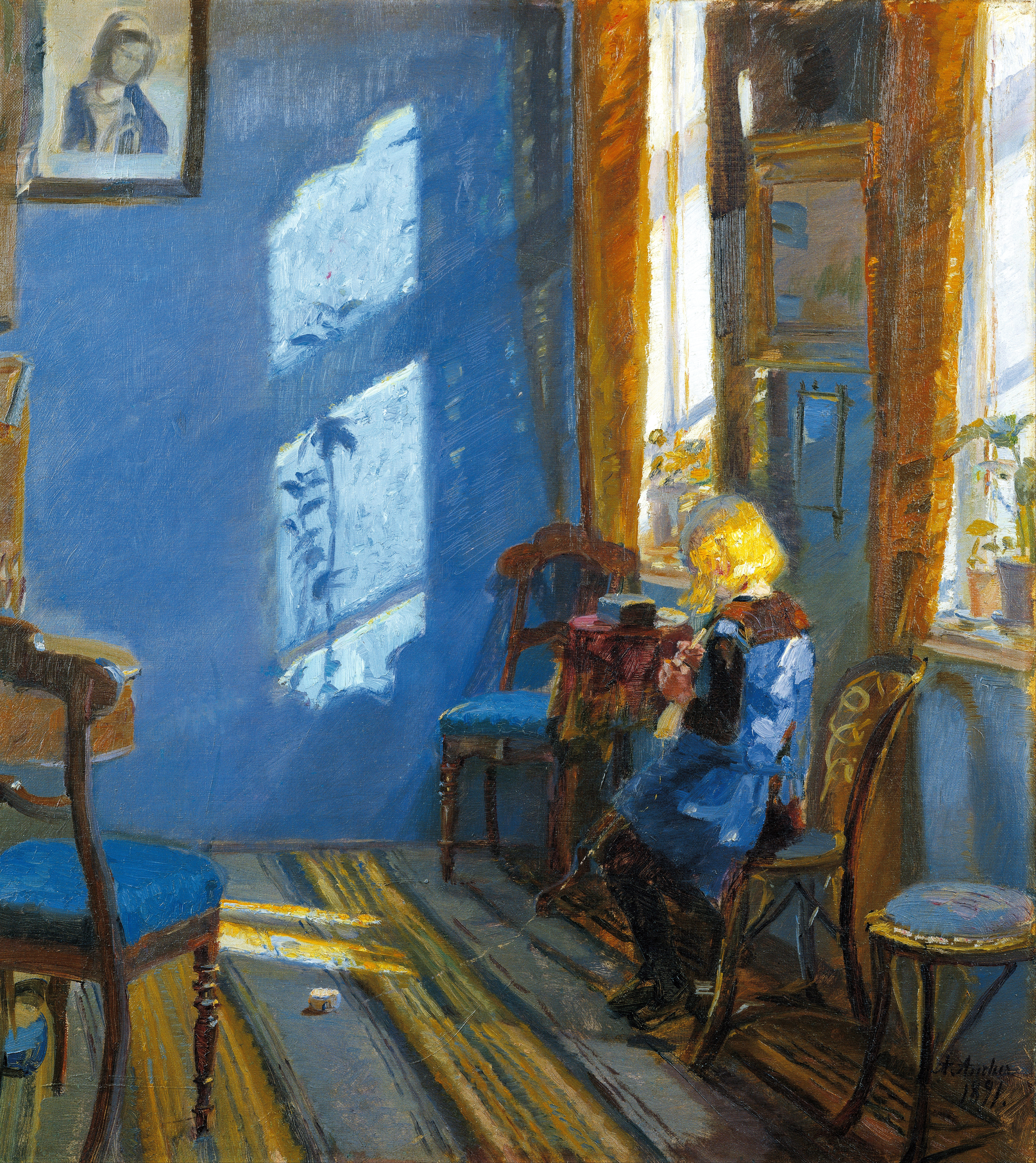
Solskin i den blå stue, 1891

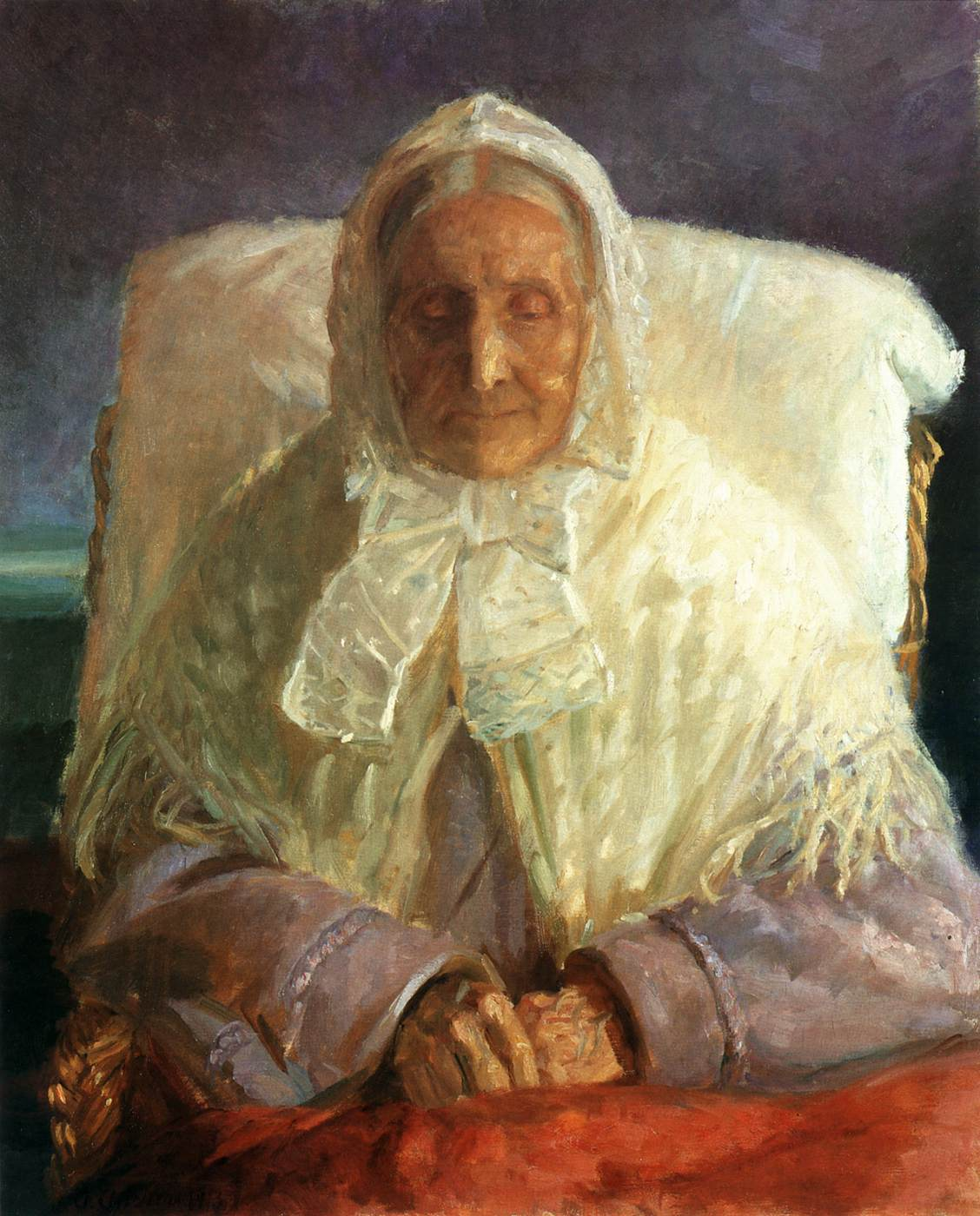
Fru Ane Brøndum i den blå stue, 1913
