= Harvesters (Ancher) =

1905 oil painting by Anna Ancher

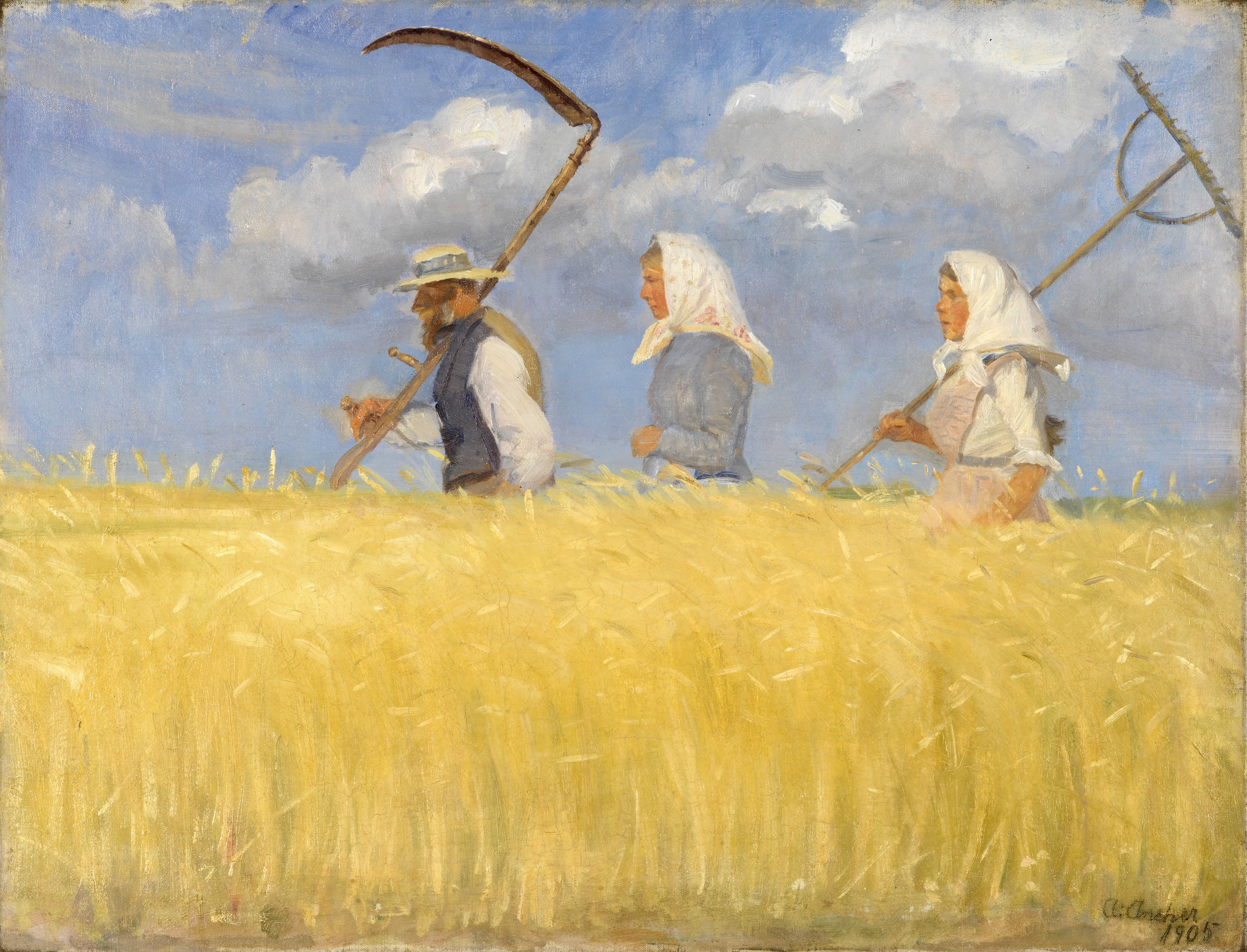
Anna Ancher: Harvesters (1905)

Harvesters (Danish: Høstarbejdere) is a 1905 oil painting on canvas by the Danish artist Anna Ancher, a member of the artists' community known as the Skagen Painters which flourished in Skagen in the north of Jutland in Denmark in the late 19th and early 20th centuries.

== Background ==
Anna Ancher (née Brøndum) was a member of the group of artists known as the Skagen Painters, an artistic colony that grew up and flourished in the fishing village of Skagen in the far north of Jutland from the 1870s into the early 20th century. She was the only member of the group to be born in Skagen; her father kept the local general store and hotel. Ancher is regarded as one of Denmark's greatest pictorial artists; many of her works concentrate on the play of light in domestic scenes, but she is also known for religious themes and her studies of her ageing mother.

== Painting ==
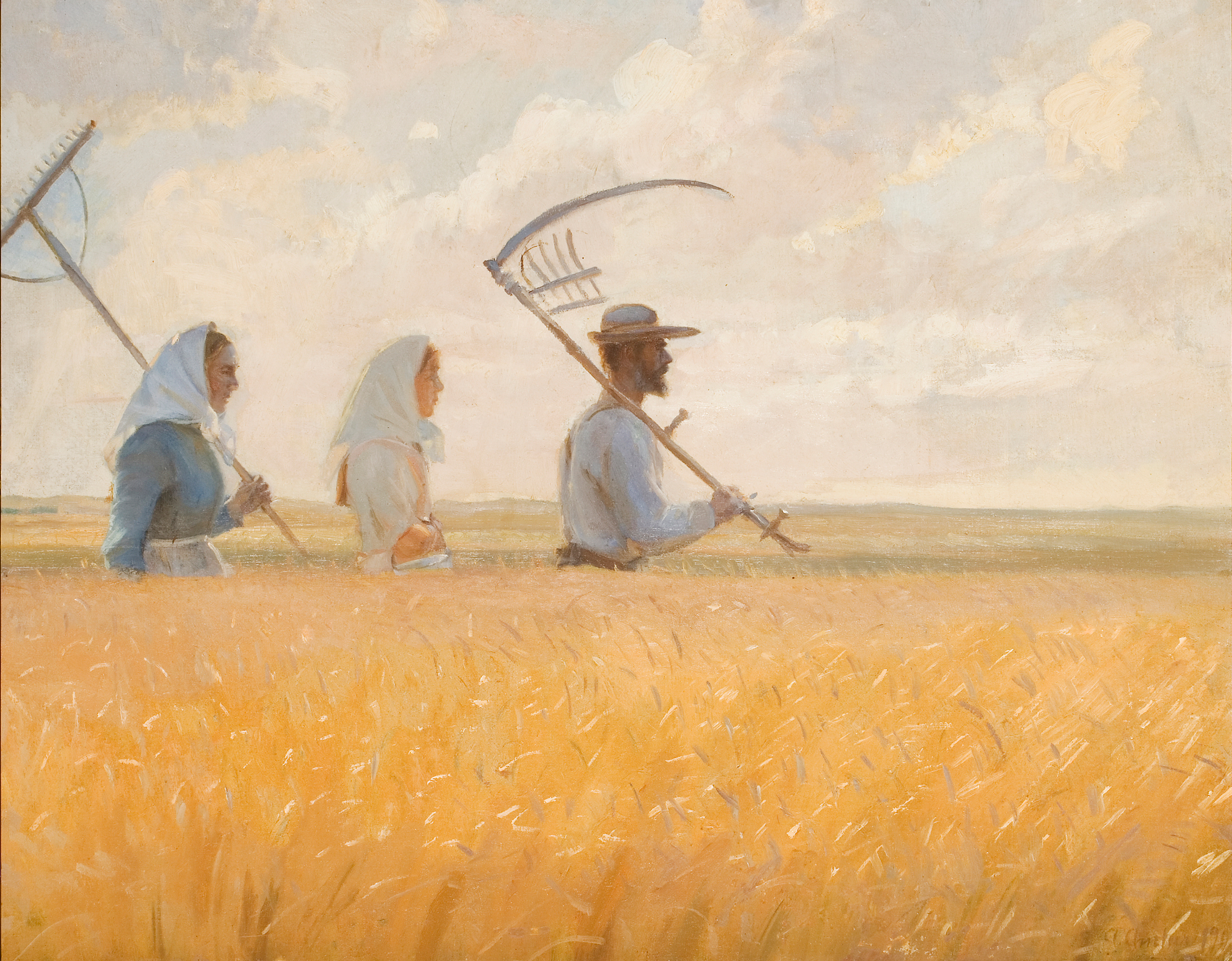
I høstens tid (Harvest Time), 1901

Harvesters shows a man and two women on their way to start the harvest in the fields around Skagen. It is unusual in the canon of the Skagen Painters whose works mainly focused on the lives of the local fishing community or depicted interior or domestic scenes. The picture is divided authoritatively into two sections: the blue sky above and the yellow cereal below with only the figures of the harvesters breaking the swathes of colour. Anna Ancher produced a few harvest scenes, all similarly setting the harvesters as the focus of the scene. The fields of ripe crops link naturally to a theme of fertility and in contrast the man carrying the scythe at the front of the group conjures up images of death, personified as the Grim Reaper; Ancher is juxtaposing life and death, but she is also depicting the order and division of labour of the harvest: traditionally the man would scythe down the crop and the women would gather up the straw with just their hands or with a rake or pitchfork. Ancher's paintings are, for the most part, not Symbolist works, but as she wrote in a letter to Martha Johansen (the wife of fellow Skagen painter, Viggo Johansen) in 1893, she thought that although she tended to "stick to nature...a little bit of Symbolism from time to time really does no harm." (Note: "...jeg holder jo alligevel på naturen, ikke sandt, Martha, den er dog dejlig? Så en smule symbolisme imellem gør heller ingen skade" (...but I do stick to nature, don't I Martha, it's so lovely. So a little bit of Symbolism from time to time really does no harm.))

Ancher's interest in producing a harvest scene may have been piqued because there were many farms close to the house she shared with her husband Michael Ancher in Skagen (now preserved as part of the Skagens Museum) and she would have seen workers passing through the fields at harvest time, but paintings on similar subjects by other artists may have also inspired her. Vincent van Gogh exhibited a harvest scene at Den Frie in Copenhagen in 1893; though there is no record of Ancher having seen the exhibition, a letter to Martha Johansen reveals she was aware of it and the trend towards Symbolism that some of the works by Van Gogh and Gauguin exhibited there displayed. Ejnar Nielsen, a proponent of Symbolism, settled in Gjern in northern Jutland in 1894, and his Landscape with rye field from Gjern (Danish: Landskab med rugmark fra Gjern) and Ancher's painting have much in common.

Harvesters is currently in the collection of Skagens Museum. The relatively small work (56.2 x 43.4 cm) is based on an earlier, larger painting by Ancher I høstens tid (Harvest Time, 1901) which was acquired by Storstrøms Kunstmuseum. It can now be seen in the Fuglsang Art Museum on the island of Lolland. The only major difference in composition between the two paintings is the direction in which the workers are walking but while the sunlight shines on the harvesters' faces in Harvesters, in Harvest Time their faces are in the shade. For her depiction of the man with the scythe in I høstens tid, Ancher used the local official and farmer "Rytter" Søren Christian Nielsen (1845–1925) as a model. Her husband, Michael Ancher, also made use of Nielsen for his harvest painting Rytter Søren harver sin mark (1903).
