= Sunlight in the Blue Room =

1891 painting by Anna Ancher

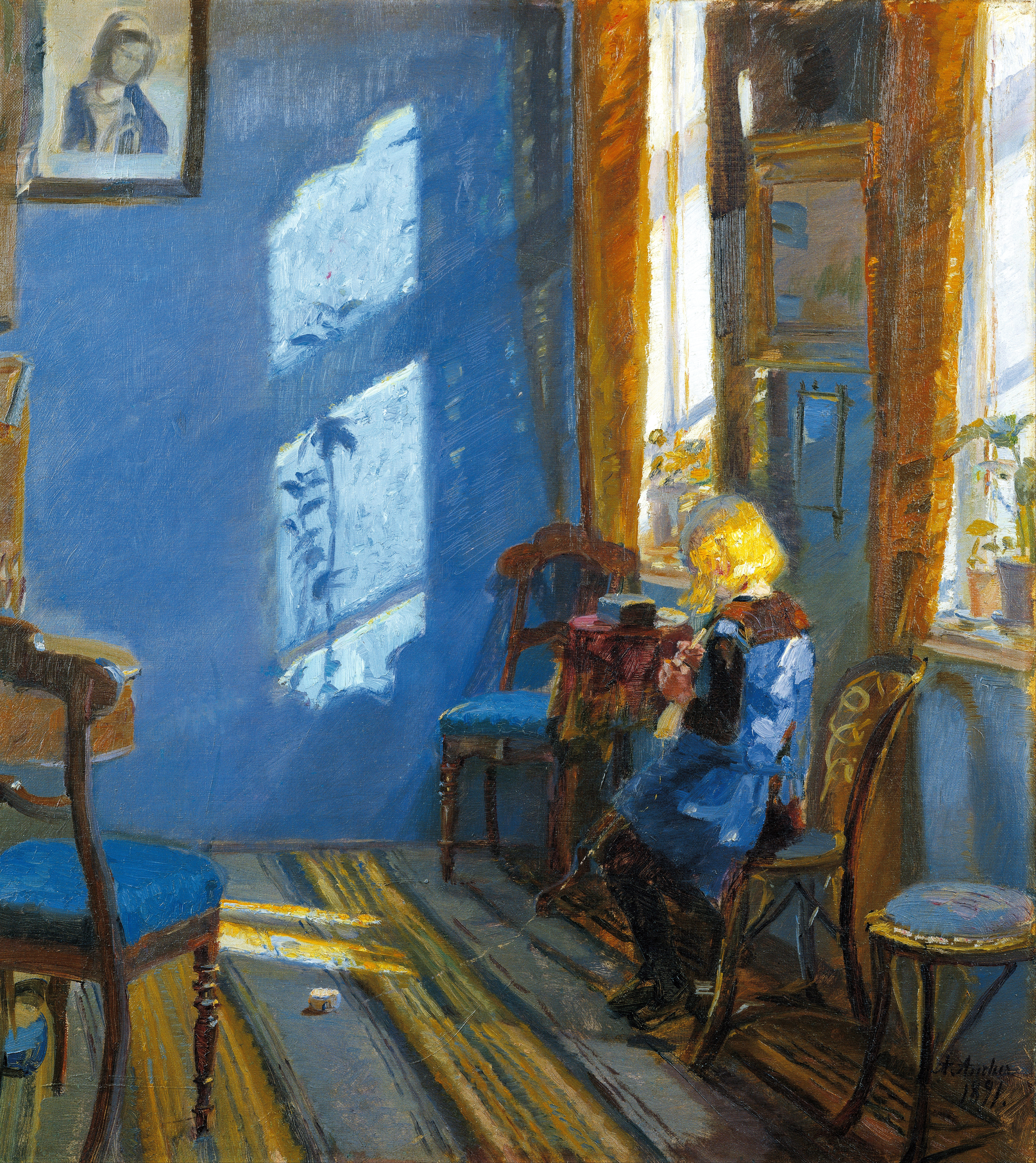
Anna Ancher: Sunlight in the Blue Room (1891)

Sunlight in the Blue Room (Danish: Solskin i den blå stue) is an 1891 painting by Anna Ancher, an innovative Danish painter who was a central figure with the Skagen Painters. With its many shades of blue and the sunlight pouring through the window, the painting is one of her most prominent works.

== Background ==
The Skagen Painters were a close-knit group of mainly Danish artists who gathered each summer from the late 1870s in the fishing village of Skagen in the far north of Jutland, painting the local fishermen and their own gatherings and celebrations. Anna Ancher née Brøndum, the daughter of the local innkeeper, was the only member of the group from Skagen itself. Inspired by the works of the artists who spent their summers at the inn, she decided to take up painting as a profession at a time when women were not admitted to the Royal Danish Academy of Fine Arts. In 1880, she married Michael Ancher, one of the most productive members of the group. Unlike the other painters who depicted the local fishermen and landscapes captured en plein air, Anna's works were mainly interiors and portraits of friends and family.

== Painting description ==
As indicated by its full title: Sunshine in the Blue Room. Helga Ancher Knitting in Grandmother's Parlour (Solskin i den blå stue. Helga Ancher ved strikketøjet i bedstemoders stue), the painting depicts Anna's daughter Helga knitting in her grandmother's room. With her back to the observer, the child is busy crocheting. Despite its everyday subject, the painting is one of Anna Ancher's most captivating masterpieces with its many shades of blue and the sense of tranquility it conveys. Devoid of action, the theme is essentially the play of light in the room. The only indication of the outside world is the light streaming through the window. Mette Bøgh Jensen, curator of Skagens Museum, explains that Anna Ancher's interior paintings are "more about the colour and light than anything else". The artist's main interest is "not in replicating the reality of the room or wall, or even the light, but rather what is left when these things are stripped away and all that remains are colour and form". Bøgh Jensen continues, "Anna Ancher's art is unlike that of anyone else. In its essence it is tied to the special world of motifs in Skagen: the fishermen's families, the harvesters, the heathers, the special colours, and the brilliant summer light."

In her Concise Dictionary of Women Artists, Delia Gaze assesses Anna Ancher's achievements as remarkable "in the modernity of her idiom, with its reduced, abstracting forms and bold expressive colours, singling her out as one of the most innovative painters of her generation, exceeding most of her male colleagues, including her husband".

== Literature ==
- Jensen, Mette Bøgh (2009). I Am Anna: A Homage to Anna Ancher. Skagens Museum. ISBN 978-87-91048-18-0.
- Svanholm, Lise (2004). Northern Light: The Skagen Painters. Gyldendal A/S. ISBN 978-87-02-02817-1.
