= Helga Ancher =

Danish painter (1883–1964)

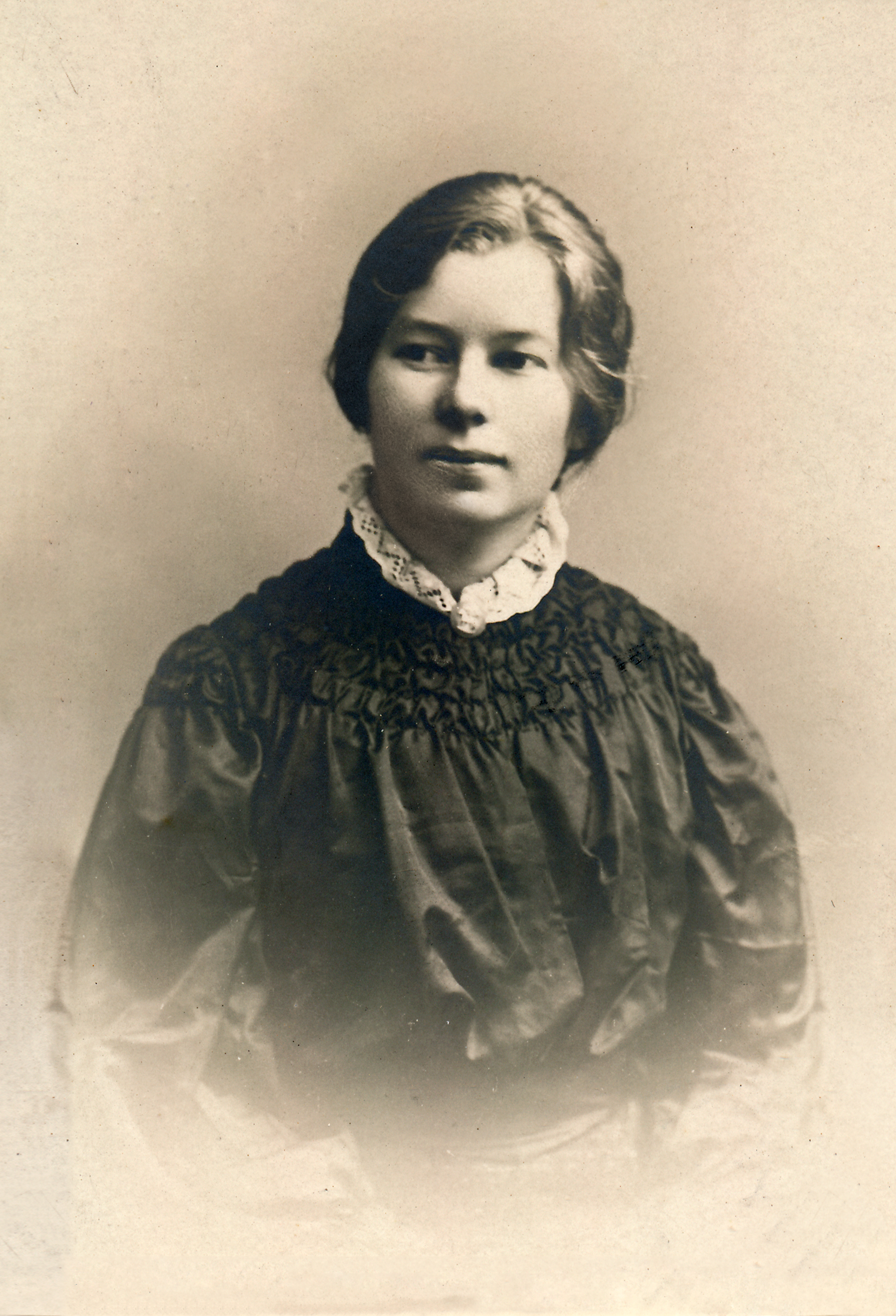
Helga Ancher. 1906. Photo: G.B. Colamedici, Rome

Helga Cathrine Ancher (1883–1964) was a Danish painter. As the daughter of Anna and Michael Ancher, she was closely associated with the Skagen Painters. Many of her paintings were of her family and friends in Skagen and of local landscapes, but a large part also featured fantastical themes from myths and folktales.

== Early life and education ==
Born in Skagen on 19 August 1883, Helga Ancher was the daughter of Anna and Michael Ancher, both of whom are among the most prominent members of the artist colony in the far north of Jutland known as the Skagen Painters. After being introduced to art by her parents, she attended Charlotte Sode and Julie Meldahl's art school in Copenhagen. In 1901, she entered the Royal Danish Academy of Fine Arts where she studied under Valdemar Irminger and Viggo Johansen until 1904. She completed her studies in Paris (1909–10) at the school run by Lucien Simon and Émile-René Ménard.

== Approach to painting ==
Helga Ancher's paintings are mainly centered on scenes from Skagen and on her family and friends. Although many of her subjects are the same as those of the Skagen Painters, she unmistakably adopts the style of her generation, making full use of colour to bring out the features of her interiors, garden scenes and flower paintings. In addition to her intimate approach to portraits, she painted a number of landscapes, often reflecting the effects of autumn or twilight. Like her contemporary Symbolists, she was also interested in literary subjects, especially opera and ballet. Some of her animal works depicting running horses and lions border on French Romanticism as well as Expressionism.

Helga Ancher exhibited little, concentrating instead on presenting her parents' works and preserving their memory. On her death on 18 March 1964, she bequeathed the family home for use as a museum. Opened in 1967 as the Michael and Anna Ancher House, it displays a large collection of their works and complete interior.

== Appearance in the works of the Skagen Painters ==
Helga Ancher was frequently depicted in the works of the Skagen Painters.

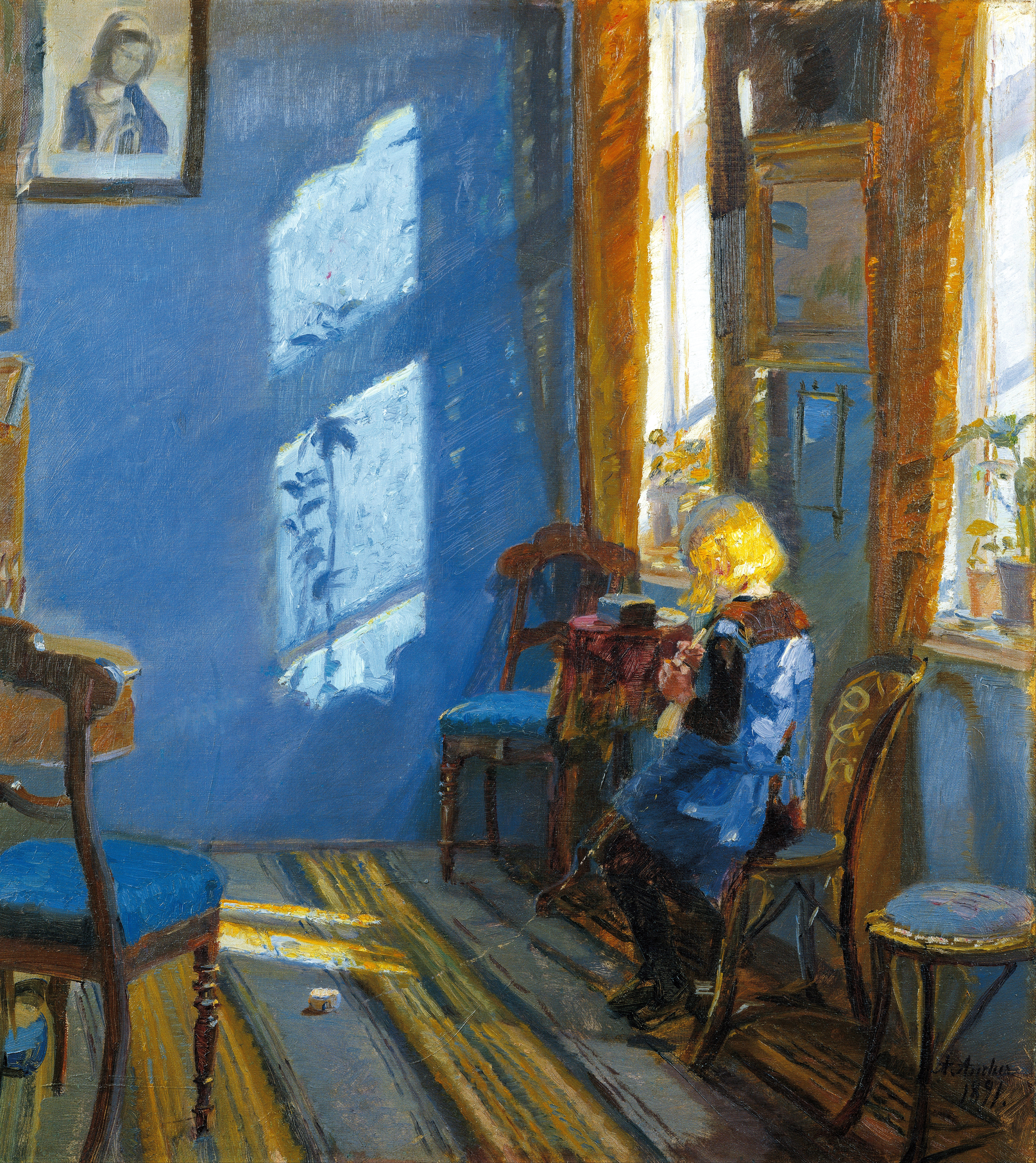
Solskin i den blå stue (Sunlight in the Blue Room), 1891, by Anna Ancher

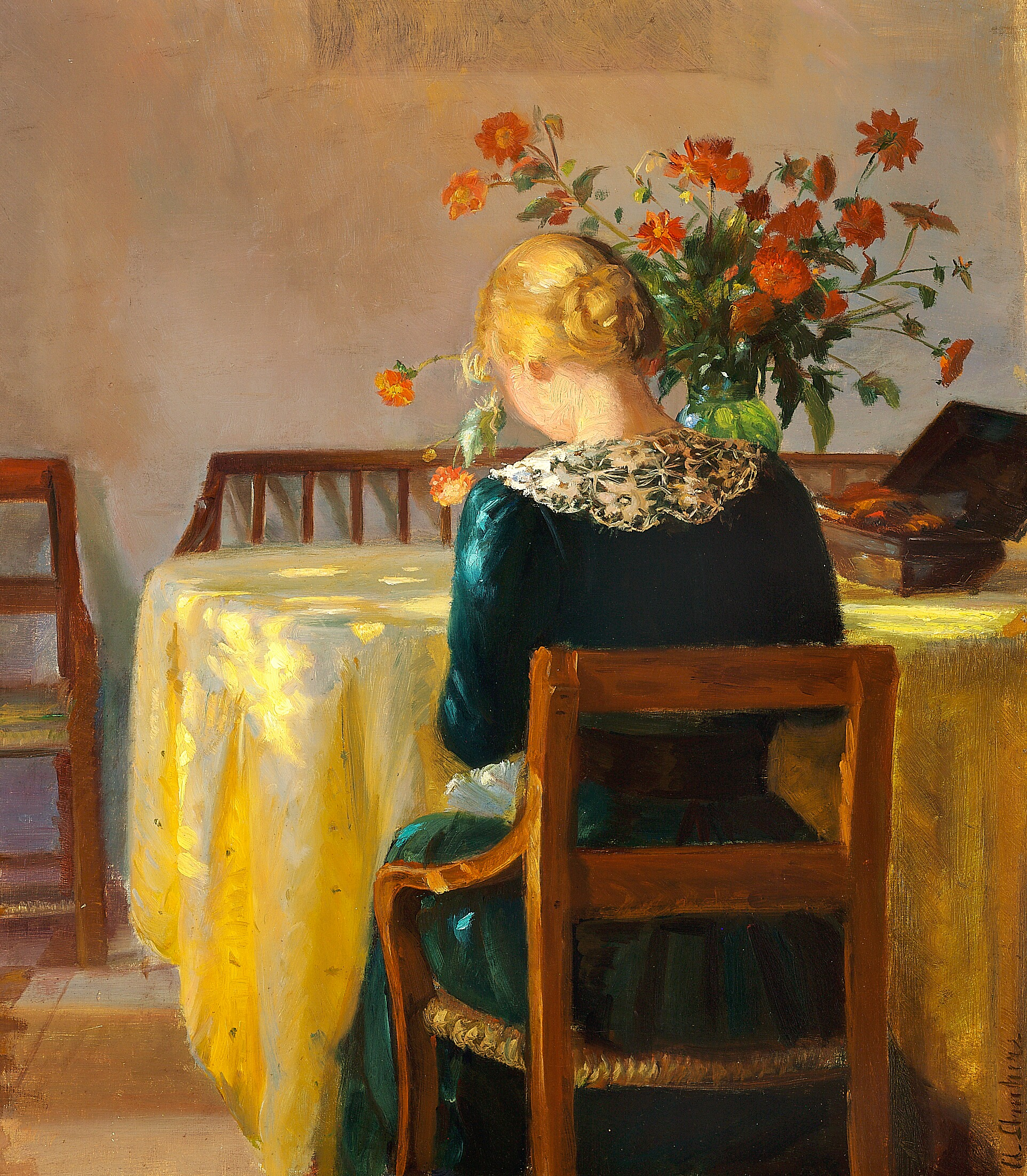
Interior With The Painter's Daughter Helga Sewing, 1890, by Anna Ancher

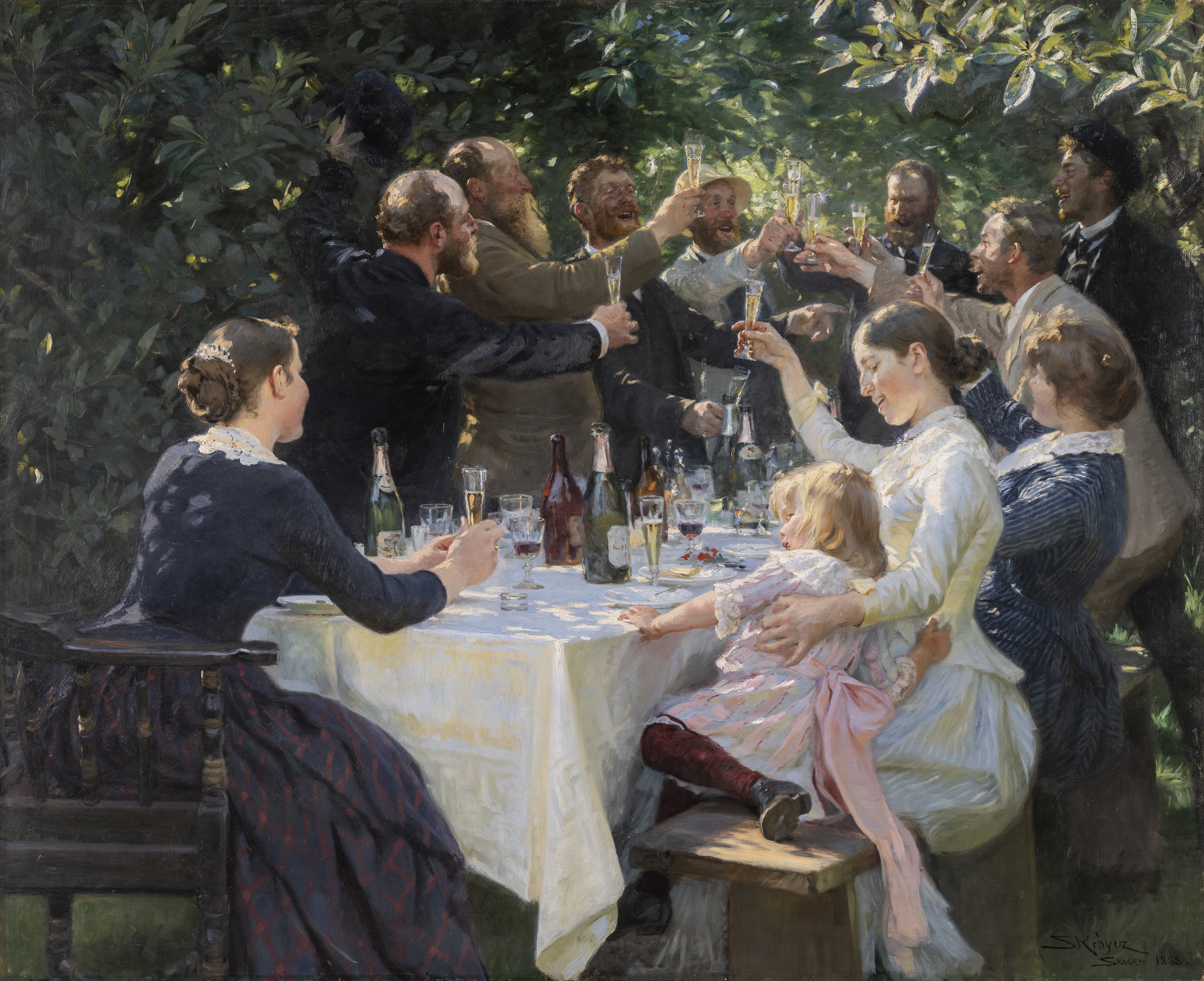
Hip, Hip, Hurrah!, P.S. Kroyer, 1888

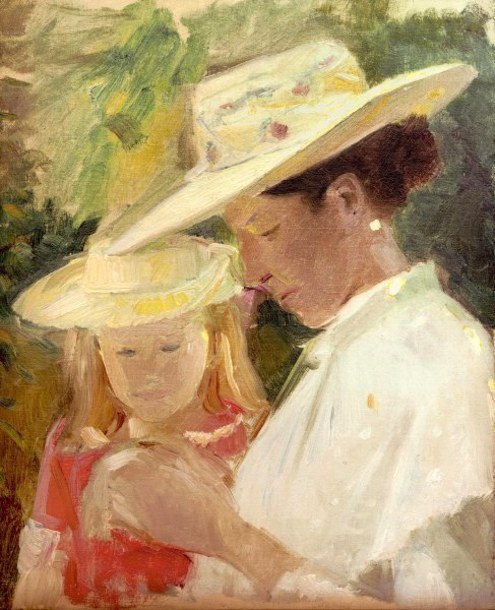
Anna Ancher with Helga in the Garden, Michael Ancher, c.1985

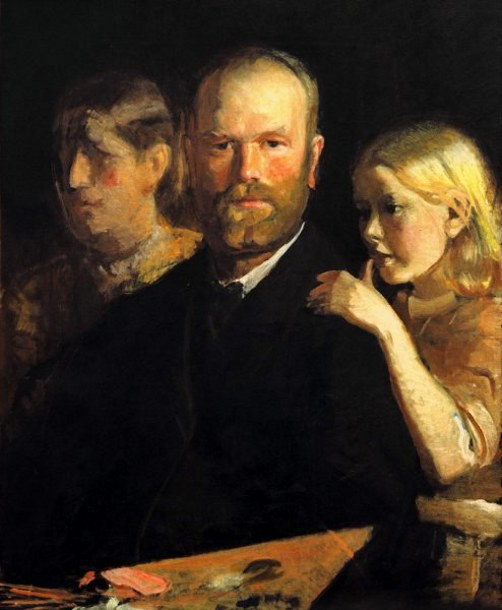
Michael Ancher: Self portrait with Anna and Helga, 1990
