= Anchers Hus =

Historic house and studio museum in Denmark

Coordinates: 57.7262°N 10.5969°E

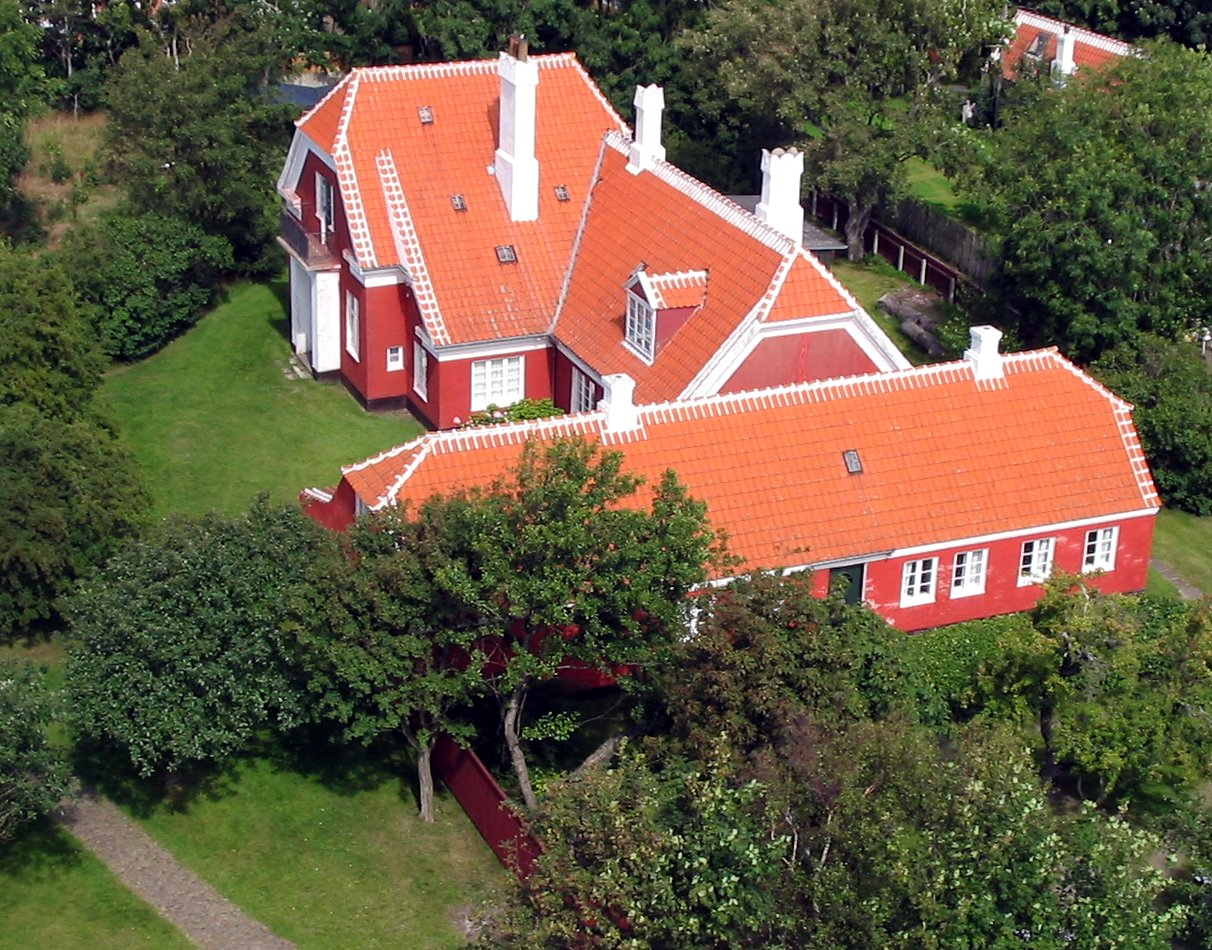
Anchers Hus in Skagen

Anchers Hus is an art museum and gallery situated in the former residence of the painters Michael and Anna Ancher in Skagen, Denmark. Anchers Hus is located on Markvej in Skagen, Denmark.

== History ==
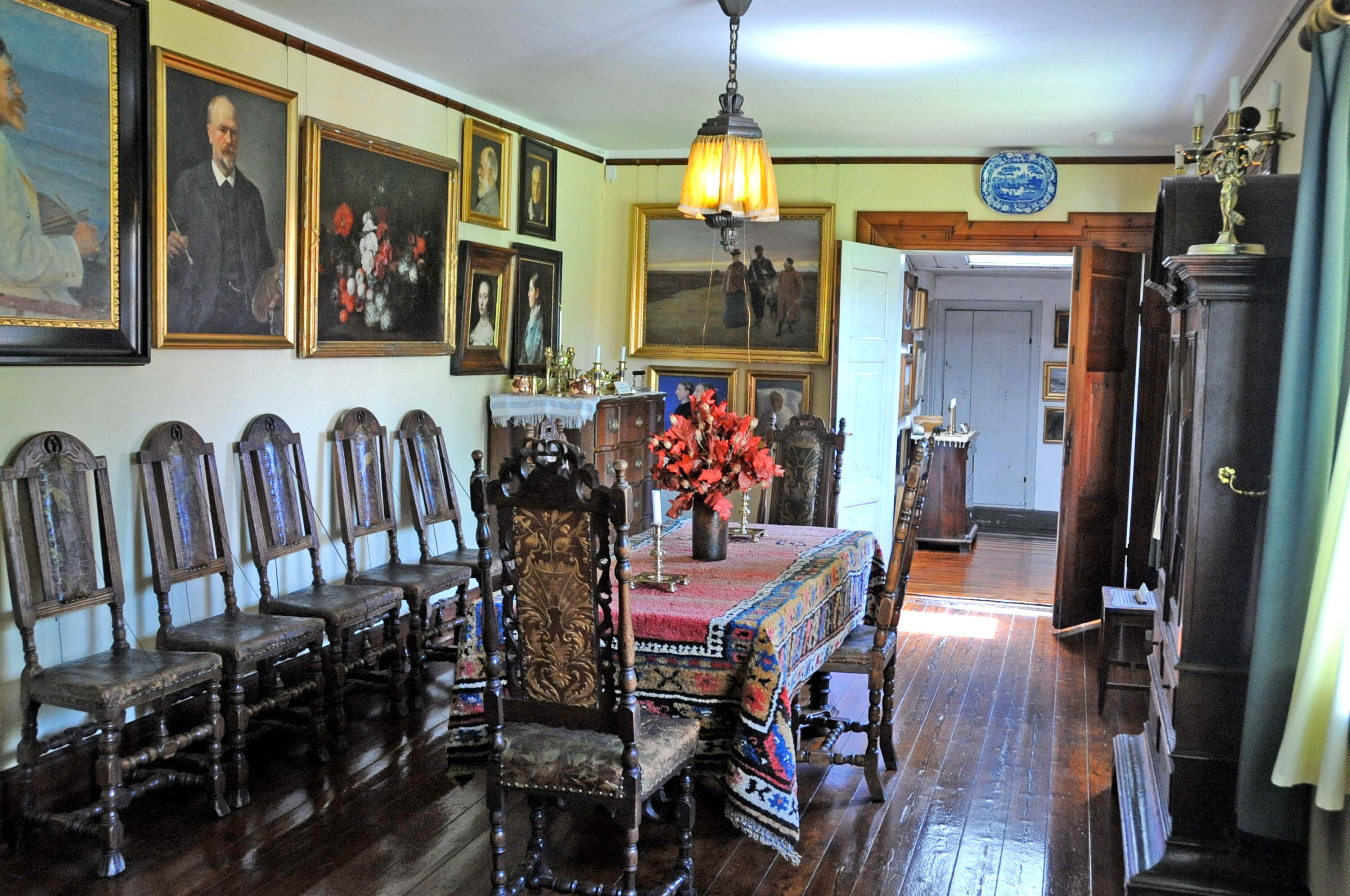
Anchers Hus interior

Michael Ancher (1849–1927) and Anna Ancher (1859–1935) were both central figures in the artist colony of Skagen Painters who lived and worked in the town during late 19th and early 20th century. After their marriage in 1880, Michael and Anna Ancher took up residency in the Garden House near Brøndums Hotel which was owned by Anna's parents. The Garden House is now a part of Skagens Museum. The house on Markvej was purchased in 1884. In 1913, a large annex was added to the property with studios, kitchen, living and bed rooms.

They lived in the house for five decades and in 1913 expanded it with a studio annex designed by architect Ulrik Plesner (1861–1933) another member of the colony. The house now serves as a historic house museum and displays a large numbers of their own works and their personal art collection. In 1989 the museum was expanded with the neighbouring home of the Saxild family, which has been used for museum café, art storage and a historical photo exhibition.

After the death of Michael and Anna Ancher in 1927 and 1935, respectively, the property was taken over by Helga Ancher (1883–1964) their only child, who owned it until her death in 1964. She left the house and all of its contents to a foundation. The former residence was restored and opened as a museum and visitor attraction in 1967, and became a part of Skagens Kunstmuseer · Art Museums of Skagen in 2014.

In 1989 the Aage V. Jensens Foundation acquired the neighbouring Saxild House (Saxilds Gaard) and donated it to the museum. The property had been in the possession of the Saxild family from the late 18th century until 1959. The east wing housed a bakery from 1810 to 1919.

== Anchers Hus today ==
Original furniture and paintings created by the Anchers and other Skagen artists are shown in the restored home and studio.

The Saxild House hosts offices and meeting spaces for staff members of the Art Museums of Skagen in one wing, while the other wing is used for a bakery and a cafe as well as a separate artist's studio.
