= Anna Ancher =

Danish painter (1859–1935)

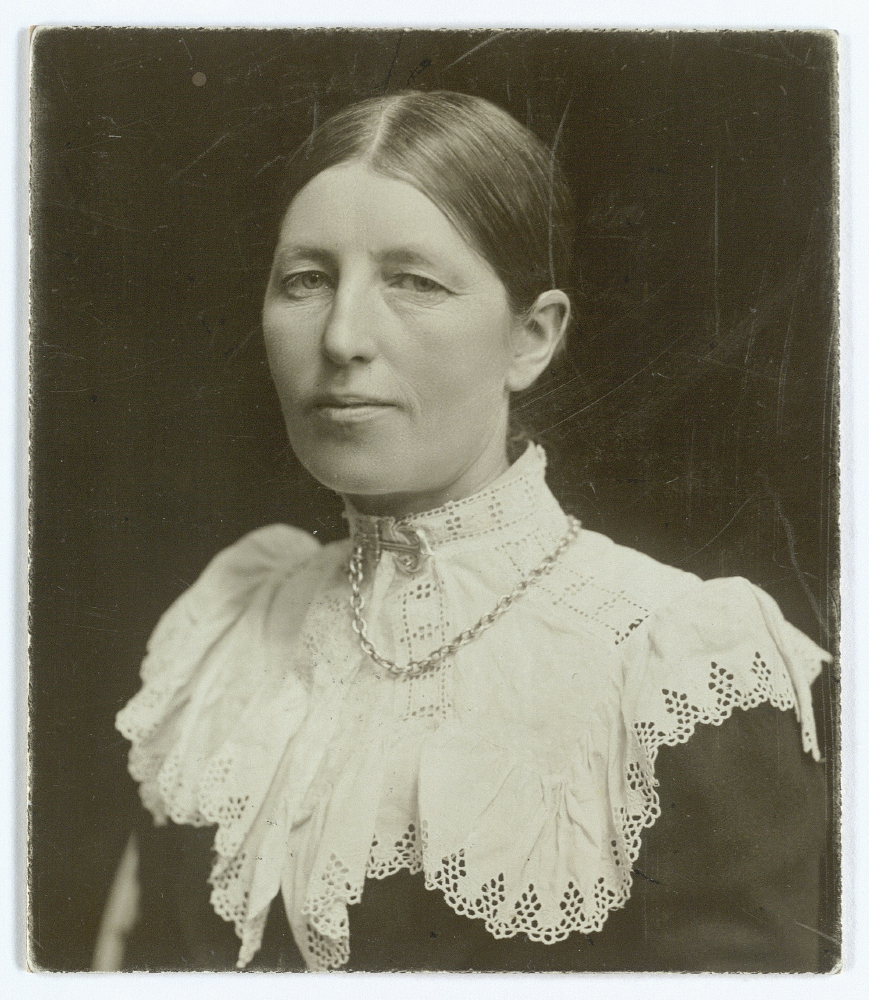
- Photo by Frederik Riise
- Born: Anna Kirstine Brøndum; 18 August 1859; Skagen, Denmark
- Died: 15 April 1935 (aged 75); Skagen, Denmark
- Education: Vilhelm Kyhn College of Painting; Pierre Puvis de Chavannes
- Known for: Painting
- Notable work: Sunlight in the Blue Room; Harvesters
- Movement: Impressionist
- Spouse: Michael Ancher (m. 1880; died 1927)
- Children: Helga Ancher
- Awards: Ingenio et Arti (1939); Tagea Brandt Rejselegat (1924)

Anna Ancher (18 August 1859 – 15 April 1935) was a Danish artist associated with the Skagen Painters, an artist colony on the northern point of Jylland, Denmark. She is considered one of Denmark's greatest visual artists.

== Background ==
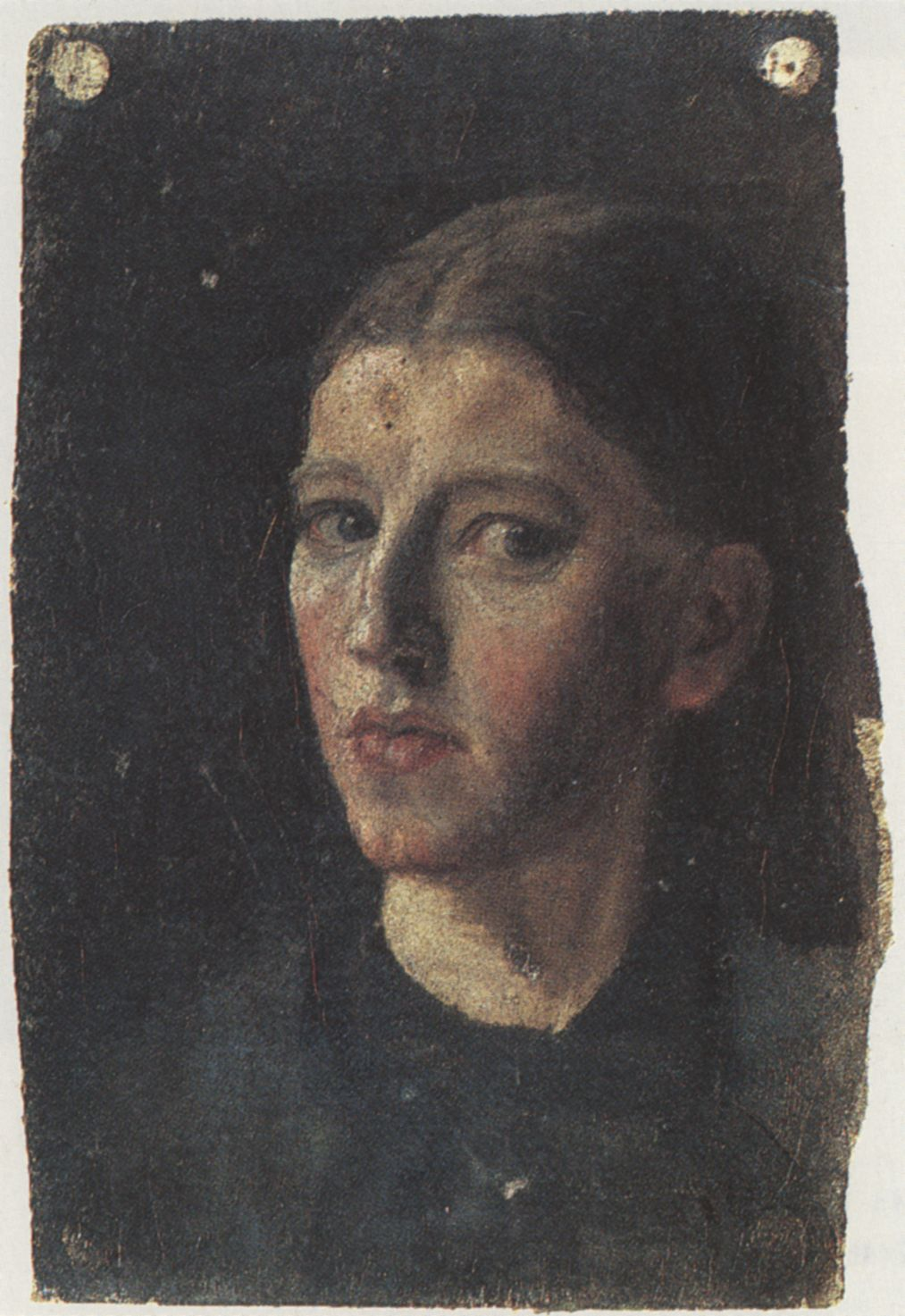
Anna Ancher, self-portrait, c. 1877–78

Anna Kirstine Brøndum was born in Skagen, Denmark, the daughter of Ane Hedvig Møller (1826–1916) and Erik Andersen Brøndum (1820–1890). She was the only one of the Skagen Painters who was born and grew up in Skagen, where her father owned the Brøndums Hotel. The artistic talent of Anna Ancher became obvious at an early age and she became acquainted with pictorial art via the many artists who settled to paint in Skagen, in the north of Jylland.

While she studied drawing for three years at the Vilhelm Kyhn College of Painting in Copenhagen, she developed her own style and was a pioneer in observing the interplay of different colors in natural light. She also studied drawing in Paris at the atelier of Pierre Puvis de Chavannes along with Marie Triepcke, who would marry Peder Severin Krøyer, another Skagen painter.

In 1880 she married fellow painter Michael Ancher, whom she met in Skagen. They had one child, daughter Helga Ancher. Despite pressure from society that married women should devote themselves to household duties, she continued painting after marriage.

== Career ==
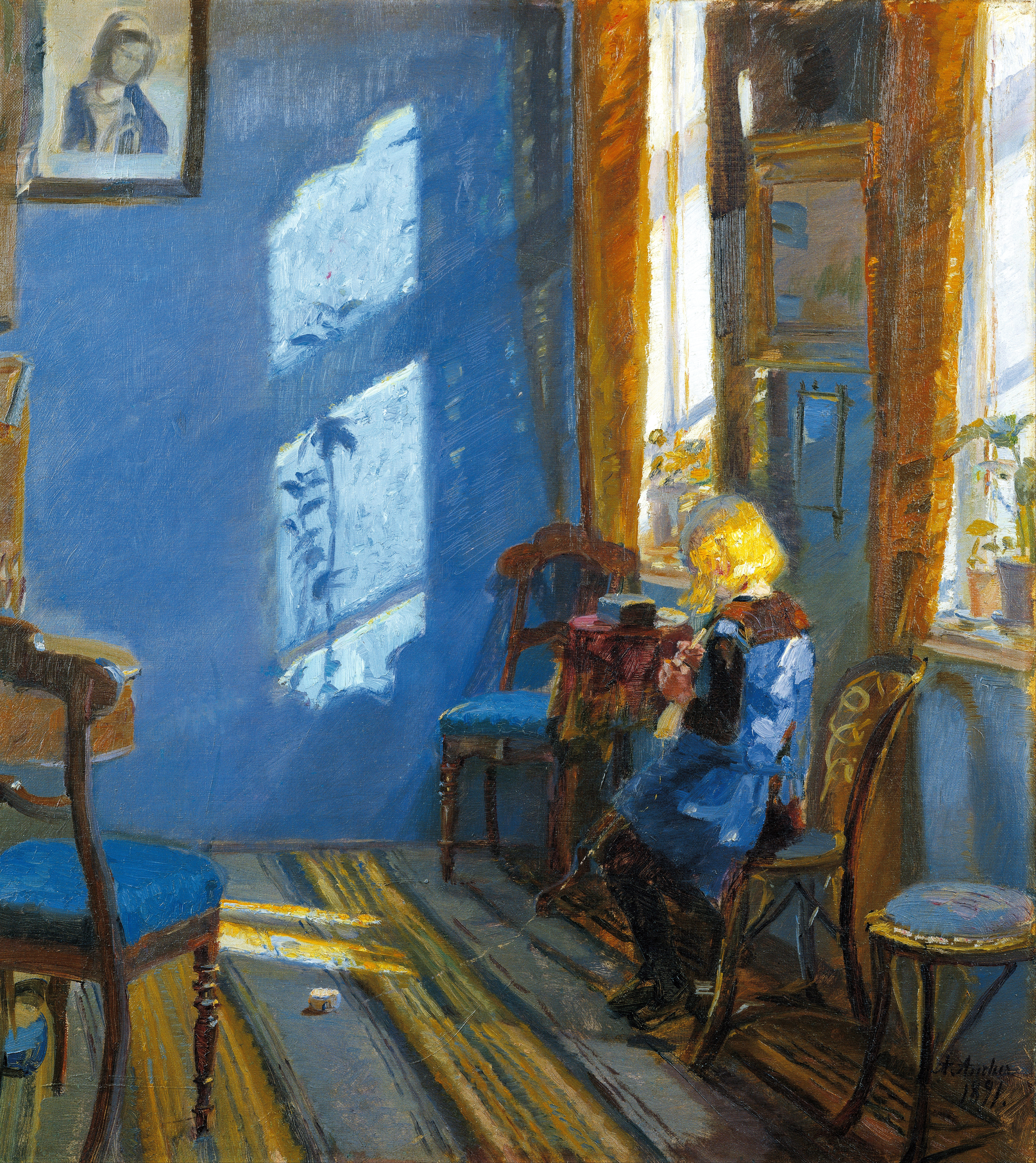
Sunlight in the Blue Room (Solskin i den blå stue), Ancher's most famous painting

Anna Ancher was considered to be one of the great Danish pictorial artists by virtue of her abilities as a character painter and colorist. Her art found its expression in Nordic art's modern breakthrough toward a more truthful depiction of reality, e.g. in Blue Ane (1882) and The Girl in the Kitchen (1883–1886).

=== Style ===
Ancher preferred to paint interiors and simple themes from the everyday lives of the Skagen people, especially fishermen, women, and children. She was intensely preoccupied with exploring light and color, as in Interior with Clematis (1913). She also created more complex compositions such as A Funeral (1891). Anna Ancher's works often represented Danish art abroad. Ancher has been known for portraying similar civilians from the Skagen art colony in her works, including an old blind woman.

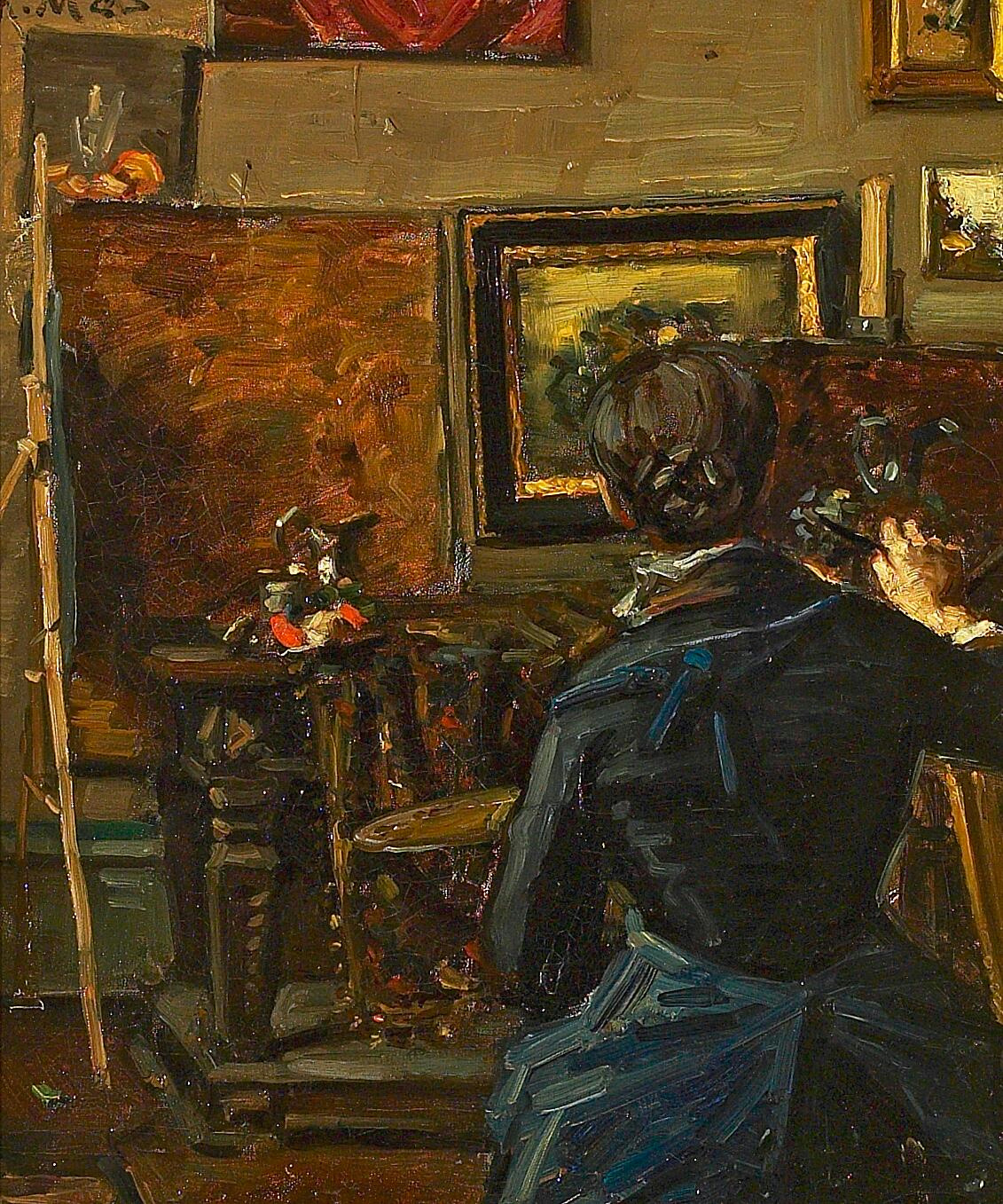
Anna Ancher painting at her easel, painted by Karl Madsen

Anna Ancher has been praised for her painting entitled, Sørg (1902), which depicts a blonde long-haired, naked woman on one side of the work, a funerary cross in the middle, and an older pious woman draped in black clothing. The religious context of the painting could be related to Ancher's own religious upbringing. Her portrayal of the female nude is unique for the time, given that this woman is not overtly sexualized and created solely as an object for the male gaze, as was typical among contemporary paintings of female nudes. Scholar Alice R. Price asserts that this painting is a reflection of Ancher's position as a woman of faith living in the traditional bohemian lifestyle of artists, that Price interprets as indicative of an ongoing inner conflict for the artist.

=== Recognition ===
She exhibited her work at the Palace of Fine Arts at the 1893 World's Columbian Exposition in Chicago, Illinois. She was awarded the Ingenio et Arti medal in 1913, and the Tagea Brandt Rejselegat in 1924.

Ancher was included in the 2018 exhibit, Women in Paris 1850-1900.

== Residence ==
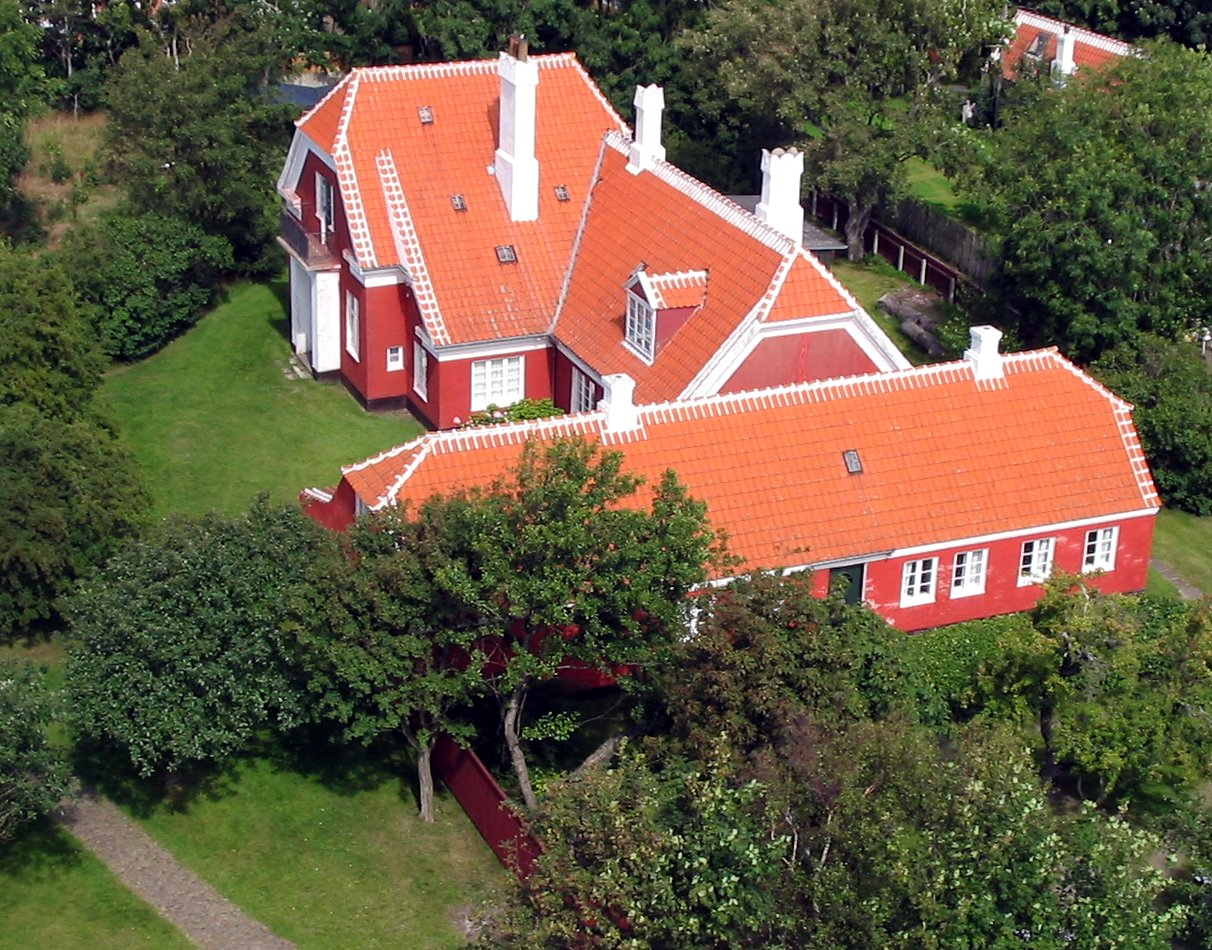
Michael and Anna Ancher's house in Skagen (Anchers Hus)

The Skagen residence of Anna and Michael Ancher was purchased in 1884. In 1913, a large studio annex was added to the property. This also formed part of what is on display publicly today as a museum dedicated to both Anna and Michael Ancher. Upon her death in 1964, their daughter, Helga Ancher, left the house and all of its contents to a foundation. The former residence was restored and opened as a museum and visitor attraction.

In 1967, Michael and Anna Ancher's house (Anchers Hus) in Skagen was converted into a museum by the Helga Ancher Foundation before Anchers Hus opened to the public for tours. The original furniture and paintings created by the Anchers and other Skagen artists are shown in the restored home and studio. Art exhibitions are arranged in the Saxild House (Saxilds Gaard), another building on the property. It is filled with displays of paintings by Michael and Anna Ancher, as well as by many other Skagen painters who made up their circle of friends.

== Correspondence ==
A collection of almost 4,000 letters between Anna and Michael Ancher and their friends, with comments by the art historian Elisabeth Fabritius, was published as Anna og Mchael Ancher. Breve og fotografier 1866-1935 I-VI was published by Forlaget Historika. in 2020.

== Danish thousand-kroner banknote ==
Anna and Michael Ancher were featured on the front side of the DKK1000 banknote, which came into circulation on 25 November 2004 and, subsequently, was replaced. The front of the banknote had a double portrait of Anna and Michael Ancher, derived from two 1884 paintings by Peder Severin Krøyer, which originally hung on the walls in the dining room at Brøndums Hotel.

== Paintings ==
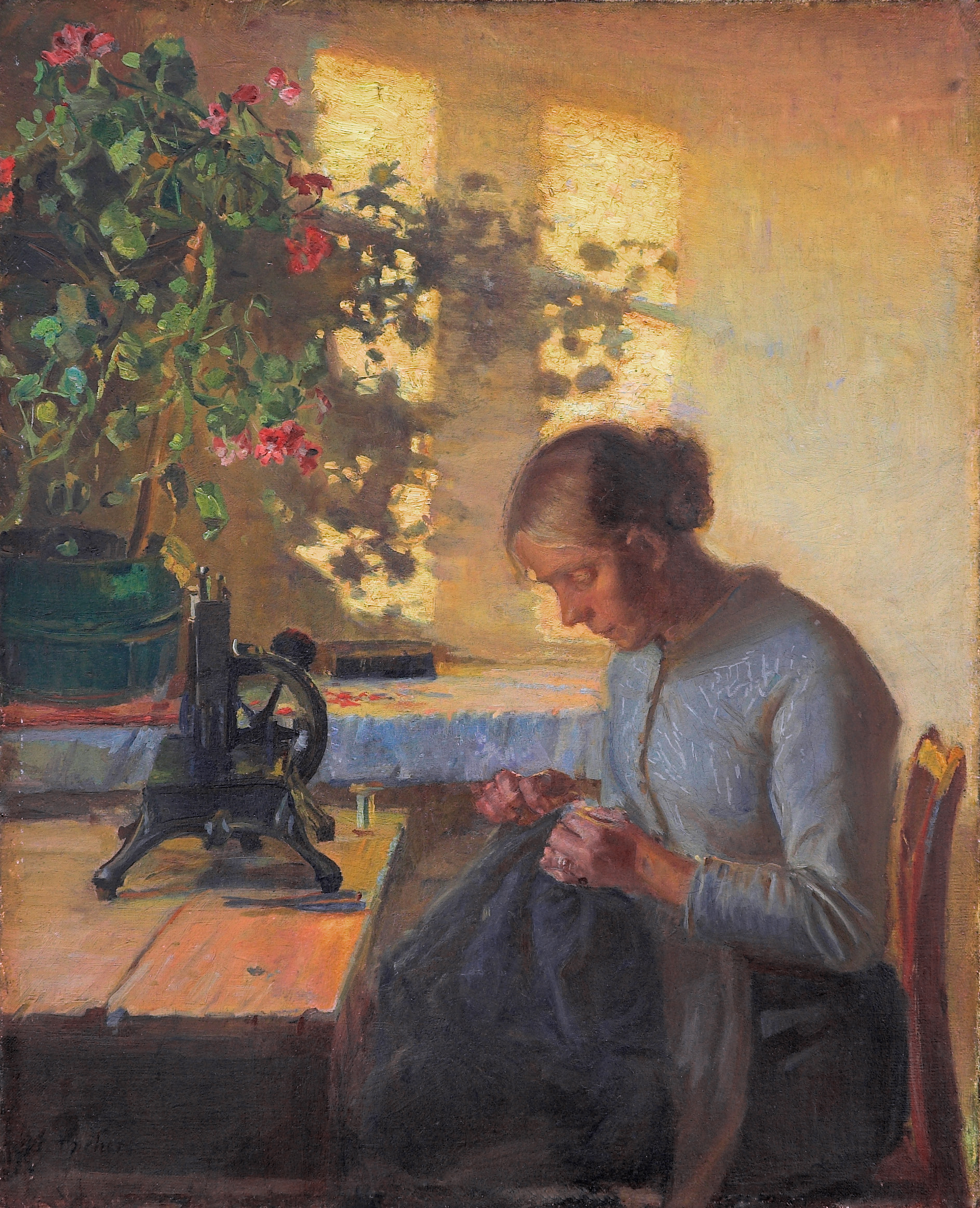
Syende fiskerpige (Sewing Fishergirl, 1890)

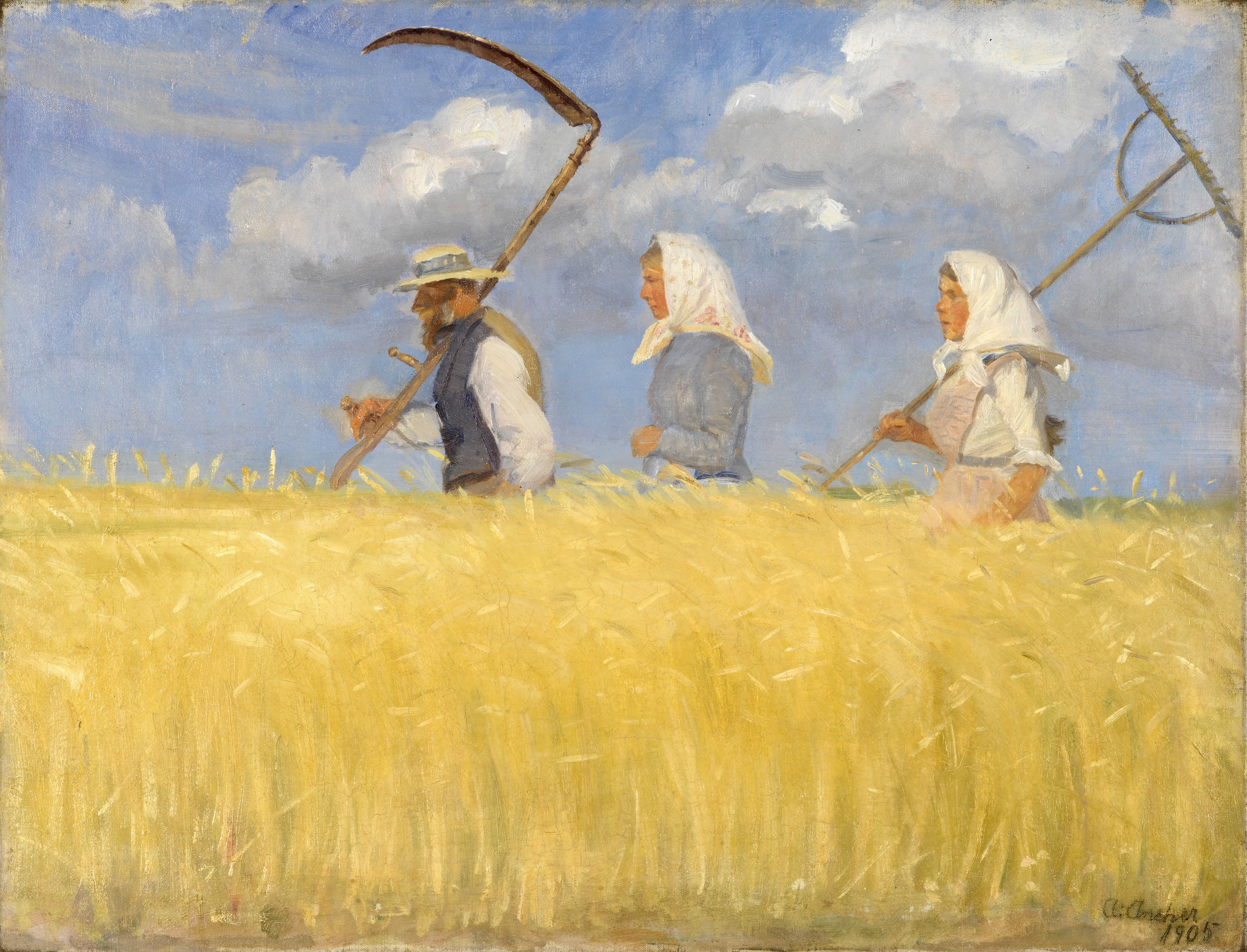
Harvesters, 1905

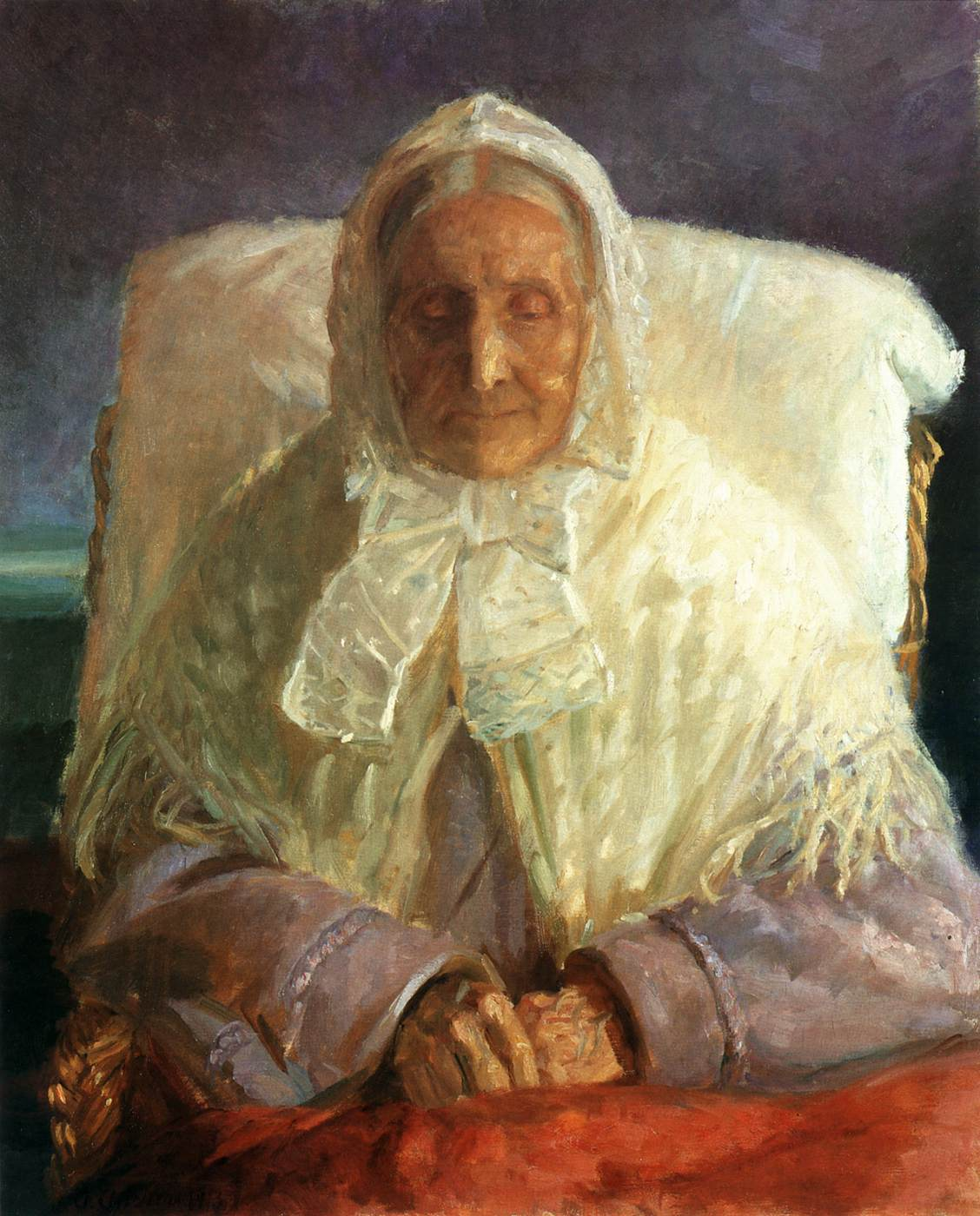
Fru Ane Brøndum i den blå stue (Portrait of the Artist's Mother, 1913)

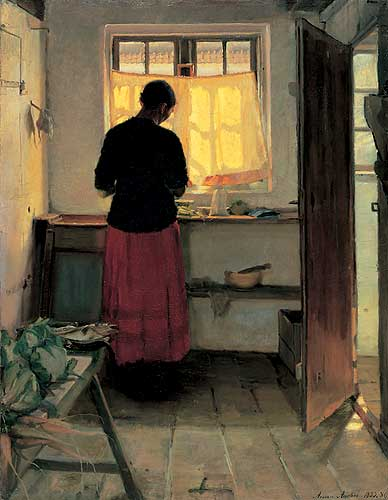
Pigen i køkkenet (Girl in the Kitchen c. 1886)

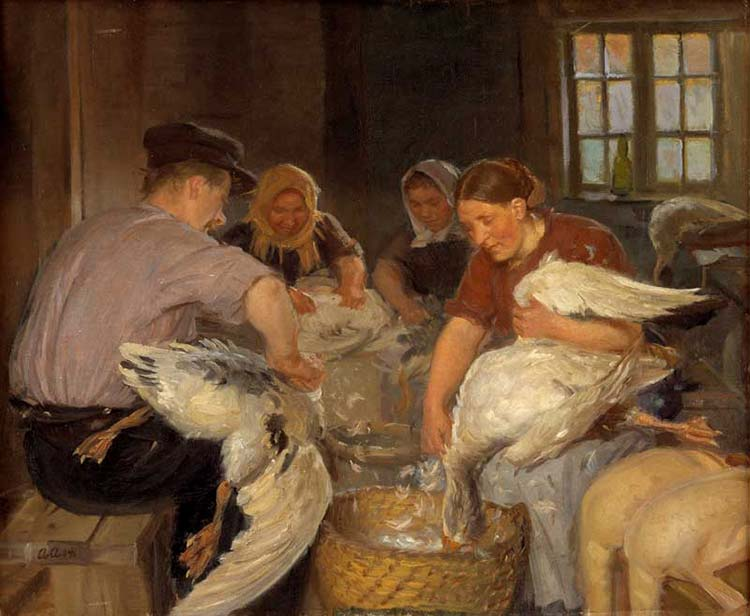
Plucking the Christmas Goose, 1904

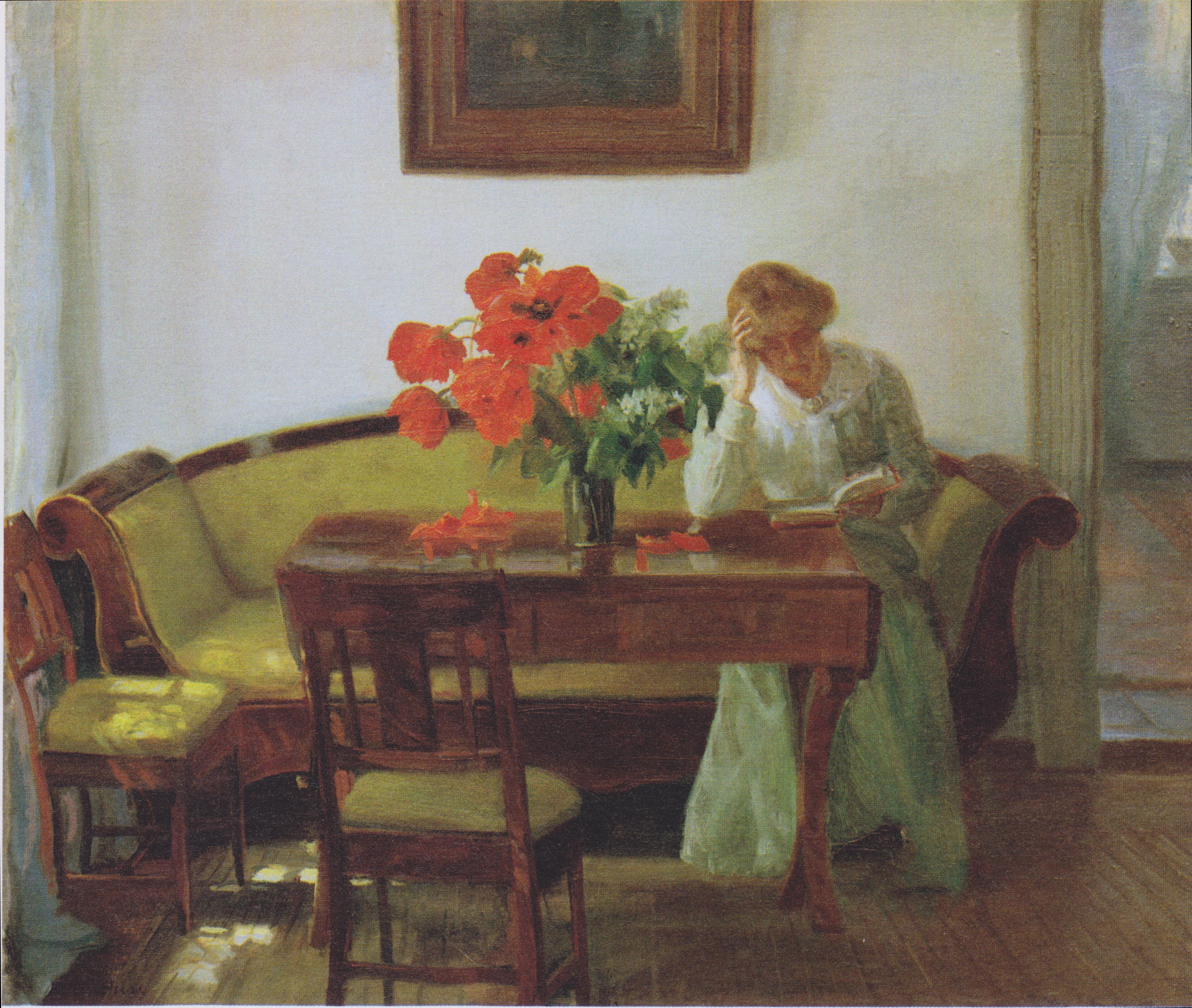
Interiør med røde valmuer (Interior with poppies and reading woman, 1905)

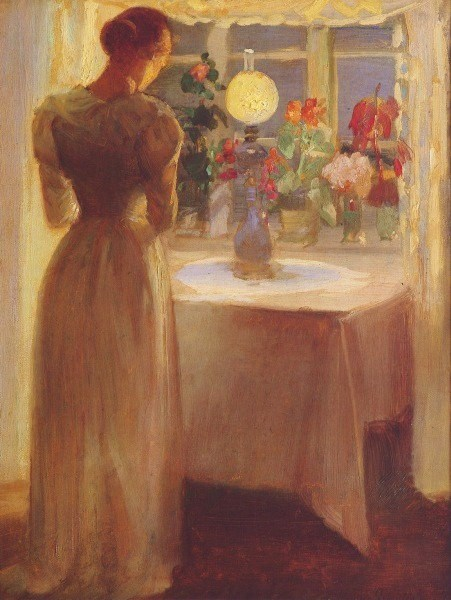
Young Girl Before a Lit Lamp, 1887

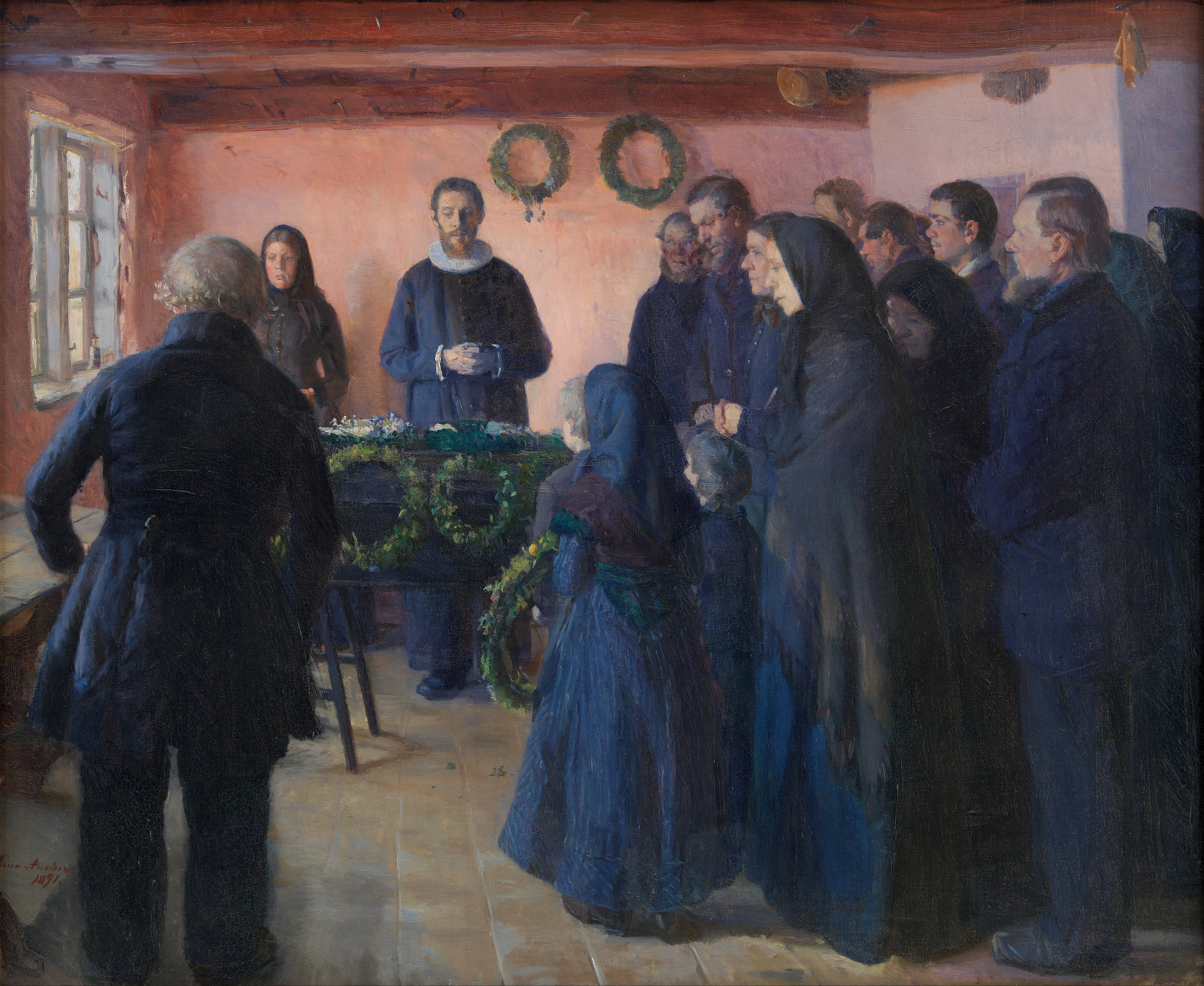
A Funeral, 1891

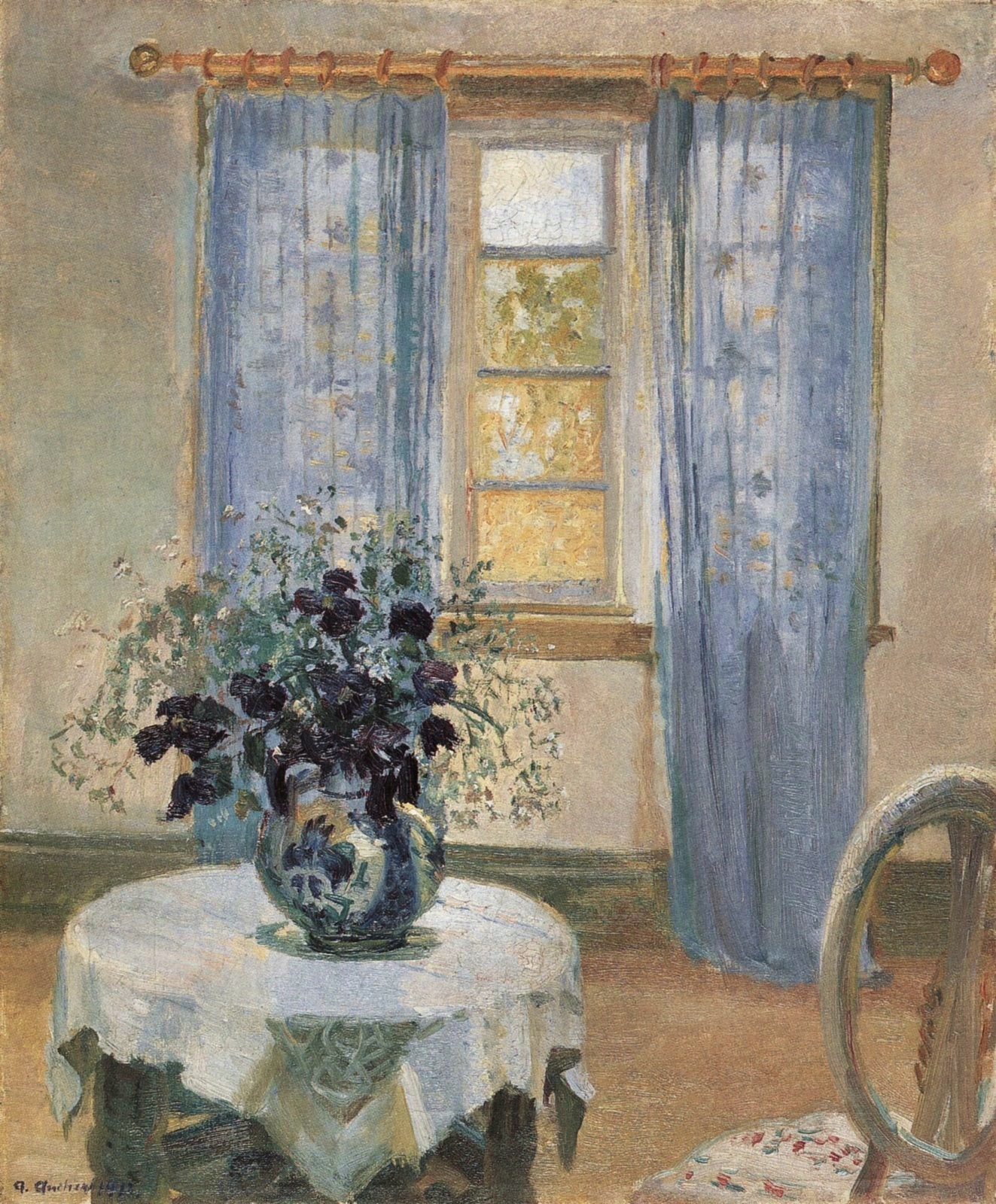
Stue med lyseblå gardiner og blå Clematis (Room with light blue curtains and Blue Clematis, 1913)

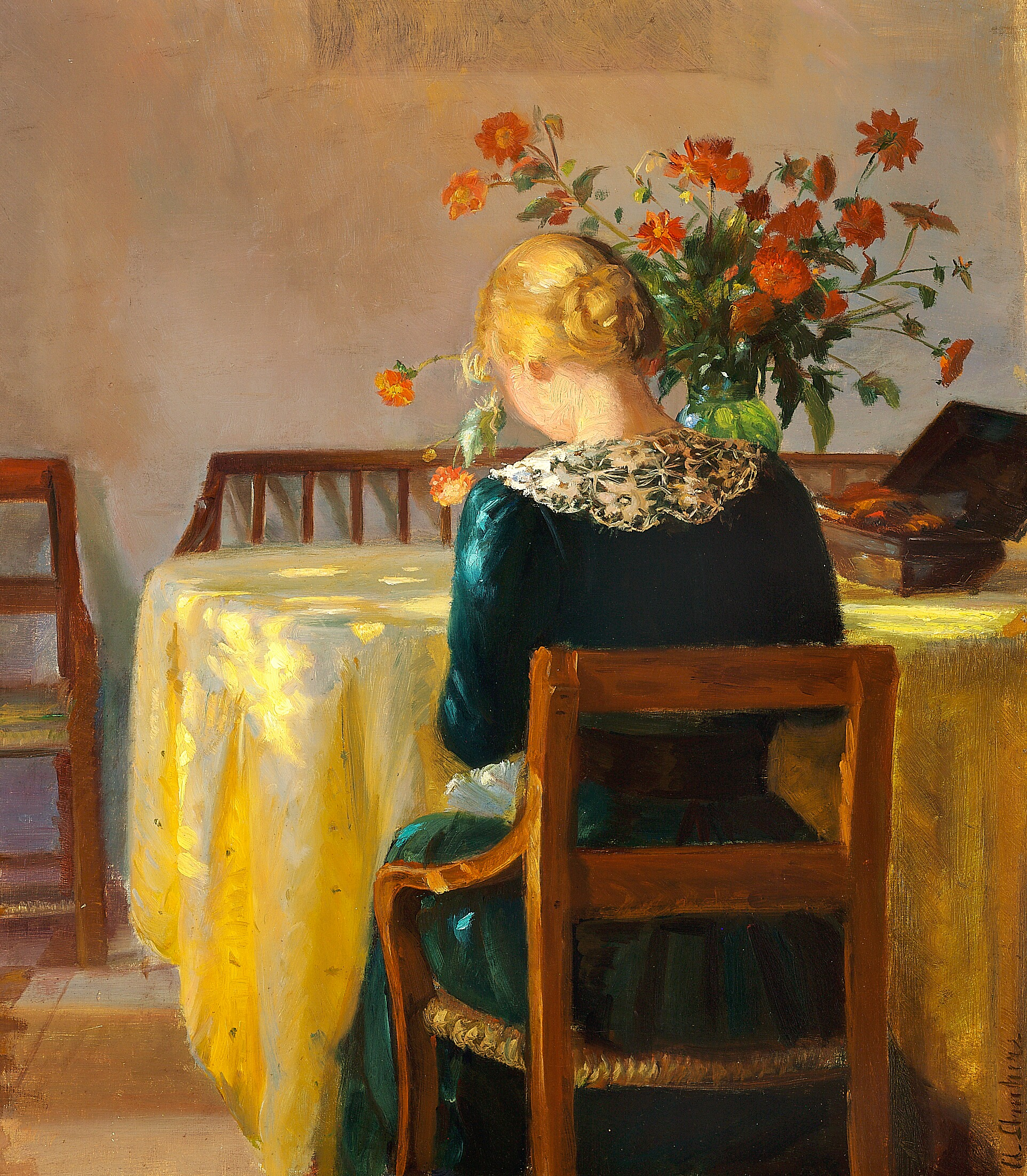
Interior With The Painter's Daughter Helga Sewing, 1890

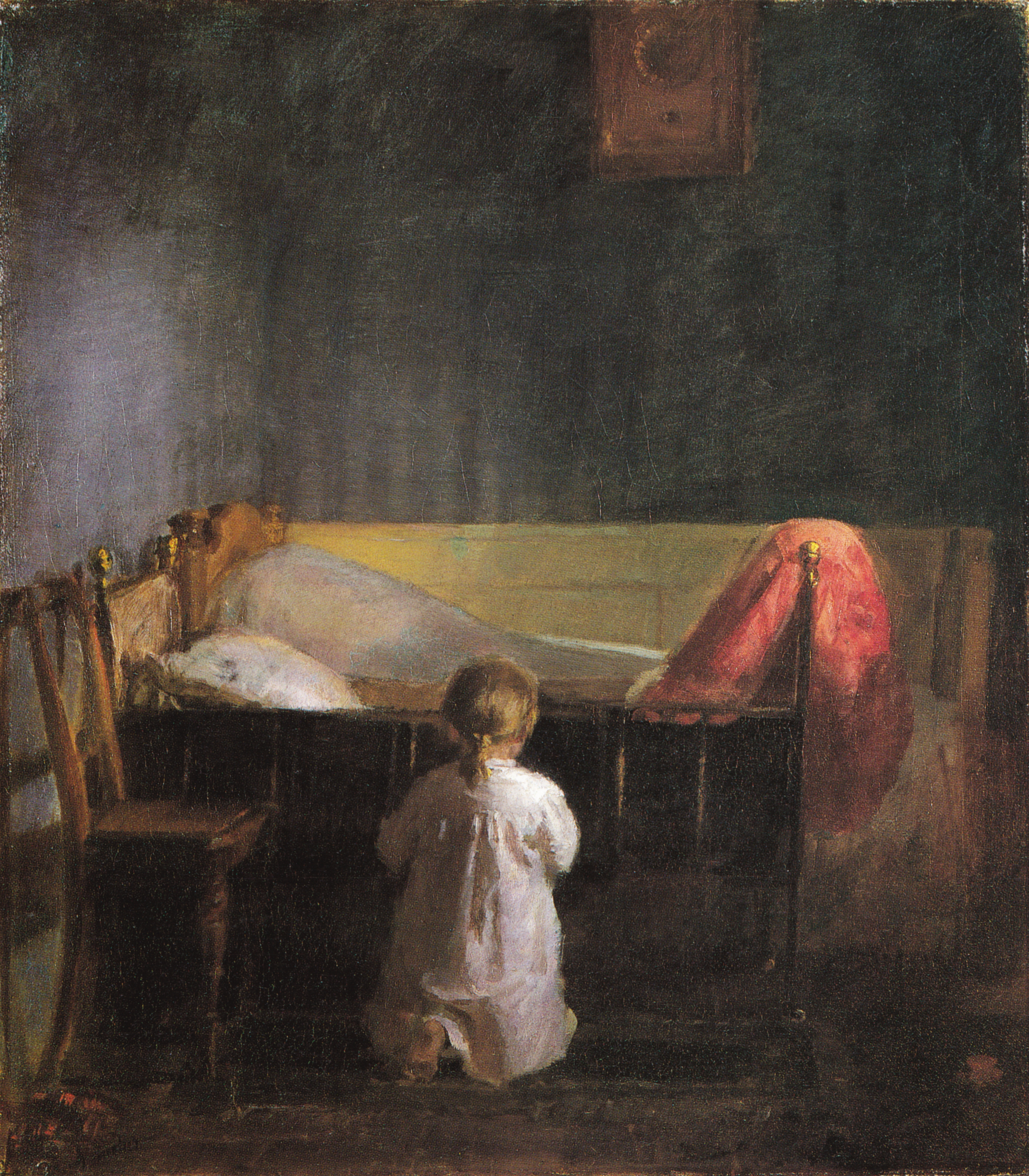
Evening Prayer, 1888

== Retrospective exhibitions ==
- Anna Ancher: Painting Light, Dulwich Picture Gallery, UK, 2025
- Anna Ancher – Skagens indre og ytre rom, Lillehammer Kunstmuseum, Norway, 2021
- A World Apart: Anna Ancher and the Skagen Art Colony, National Museum of Women in the Arts, 2013
- Anna Ancher, Arken Museum of Modern Art, Copenhagen, 2011
- I Am Anna. A Homage to Anna Ancher, Skagens Museum, Denmark, 2009
- Anna Ancher & Co.—The Painting Women, Ribe Kunstmuseum, Denmark, 2007
- Anna Ancher—det besjælede rum, Ribe Kunstmuseum, Denmark, 1999
- Anna Ancher, 1859–1935, Malerin in Skagen, Niedersächsisches Landesmuseum, Hannover, 1994–1995

== See also ==
- Skagen Painters
- Michael Ancher
- Anchers Hus
- Skagen Museum
- Brøndums Hotel

== Literature ==
- Fabritius, Elisabeth (2008). Anna Ancher: The Pastels. Forlaget Vandkunsten. ISBN 978-87-7695-077-4.
- Jensen, Mette Bøgh (2009). I Am Anna: A Homage to Anna Ancher. Skagens Museum. ISBN 978-87-91048-18-0.
- Wivel, Ole (1987). Anna Ancher 1859-1935. Stokholms Forlag.
