= Sand-Covered Church =

Church in Denmark

Coordinates: 57.713534°N 10.55089°E

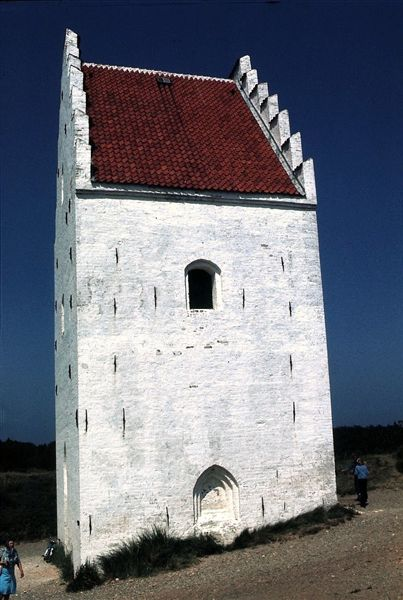
The Sand-Covered Church is named after Saint Lawrence, in Danish Sct. Laurentii Kirke

The Sand-Covered Church (Danish: Den Tilsandede Kirke, also translated as The Buried Church, and also known as Old Skagen Church) is the name given to a late 14th-century church dedicated to Saint Lawrence of Rome. It was a brick church of considerable size, located 2 kilometres (1.2 mi) southwest of the town centre of Skagen, Denmark. During the last half of the 18th century the church was partially buried by sand from nearby dunes; the congregation had to dig out the entrance each time a service was to be held. The struggle to keep the church free of sand lasted until 1795, when it was abandoned. The church was demolished, leaving the tower with crow-stepped gable as the only part of the original structure still standing.

== Architecture ==
The church is one of the oldest buildings in Skagen. It was built of brick in the Gothic style between 1355 and 1387 (the date of its first mention). The church had a long vaulted nave, with exterior buttresses, and a tower with crow-stepped gable, added around 1475. The vestry was on the north side, the porch on the south side, and the tower on the west end of the nave. The church was 45 metres (148 ft) long including the tower, which is a bit more than 22 metres (72 ft) high. The body of the church was built in red brick with a lead roof, and the tower raised in patterned yellow brick, which was whitewashed over after 1816. The bricks were imported from the Netherlands and Germany, especially from Lübeck. Approximately 18 metres (59 ft) of the tower is visible above the sand today.

== History ==
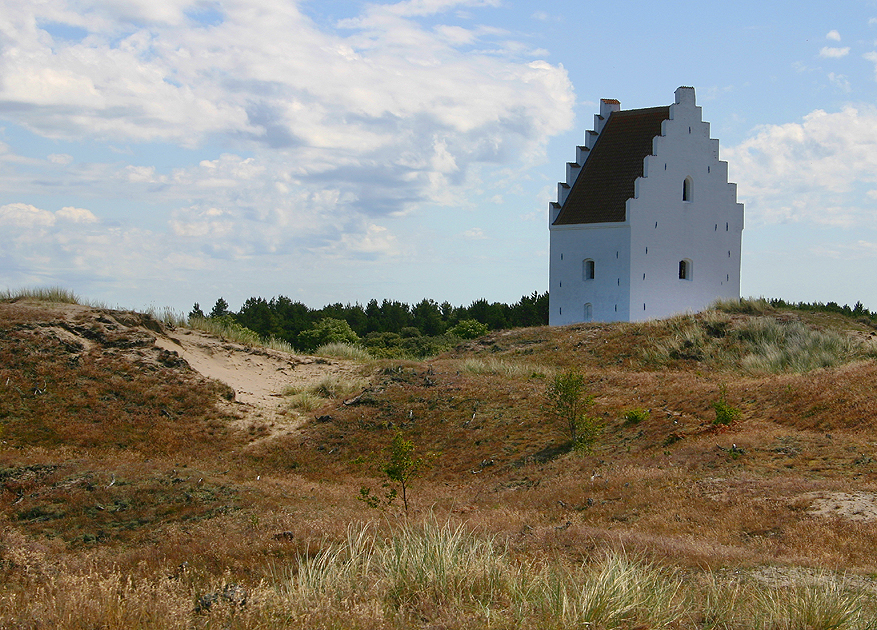
The Sand-Covered Church was in medieval times the largest church in the region of Vendsyssel. Nowadays only the church tower still stands, rising above the sandy dunes.

The church was mentioned for the first time in relation to the stranding of a Hanseatic ship at Skagen on 31 March 1387. The first day 861 pieces of cloth were salvaged and brought to the nearest church. The next day the priest, Mr. Bernhard, brought another seven packages of cloth to the Sand-Covered Church. Queen Margaret I of Denmark received 400 pieces of cloth, and in 1394 ended up paying 320 nobles in restitution even though the merchants valued the cloth at 2,750 nobles. The priest kept the seven packs of cloth but swore “by his dignity as a priest to report to the king and queen how many lengths they contained”.

The church belonged to the Crown until 1459, when ownership was handed over to the Hospital of the Holy Ghost, Aalborg.

Sand began drifting in from Råbjerg Mile around 1600, when the area surrounding the church was affected by the desertification which destroyed the fields; it buried the nearby village (near Skagen) and had reached the church by the end of the 18th century. This sanding-over of land occurred in many coastal areas around the North Sea between 1400 and 1800, affecting Scotland, Denmark, and Holland; in the 1690s two such events took place in Scotland, and the desertification in the Skagen area happened over two centuries. On Great Prayer Day (Danish religious holiday celebrated on the fourth Friday after Easter) in 1775, the church door had to be dug free for the congregation to be able to attend the service, and for the following 20 years, the Skageners struggled to keep the church free from sand, without being allowed to close it down. The furnishings and interior decorations were removed and some items were sold. In 1795 the church was closed by royal decree and the body of the church demolished. The chalice, candlesticks, and a bell were used in the new Skagen Church built by C. F. Hansen in 1841.

The last funeral in the churchyard took place either in 1801 or in 1810, according to various accounts. In the late 19th century the National Museum of Denmark, who now own the site, carried out a minor excavation near the tower. The site of the nave has never been excavated. It is believed that the floor, the altar, and the baptismal font are still there under the sand. All that is visible of the former church and the now-buried village is the whitewashed church tower, which is still maintained as a navigational landmark.

The tower has been a listed building since before 1937, and it is one of the best-known Danish churches. Its tower has attracted attention from writers such as Hans Christian Andersen, who used the church as a setting in his "En Historie fra Klitterne".
