= Skagen Church =

Coordinates: 57.7214°N 10.5847°E

- Skagen Kirke
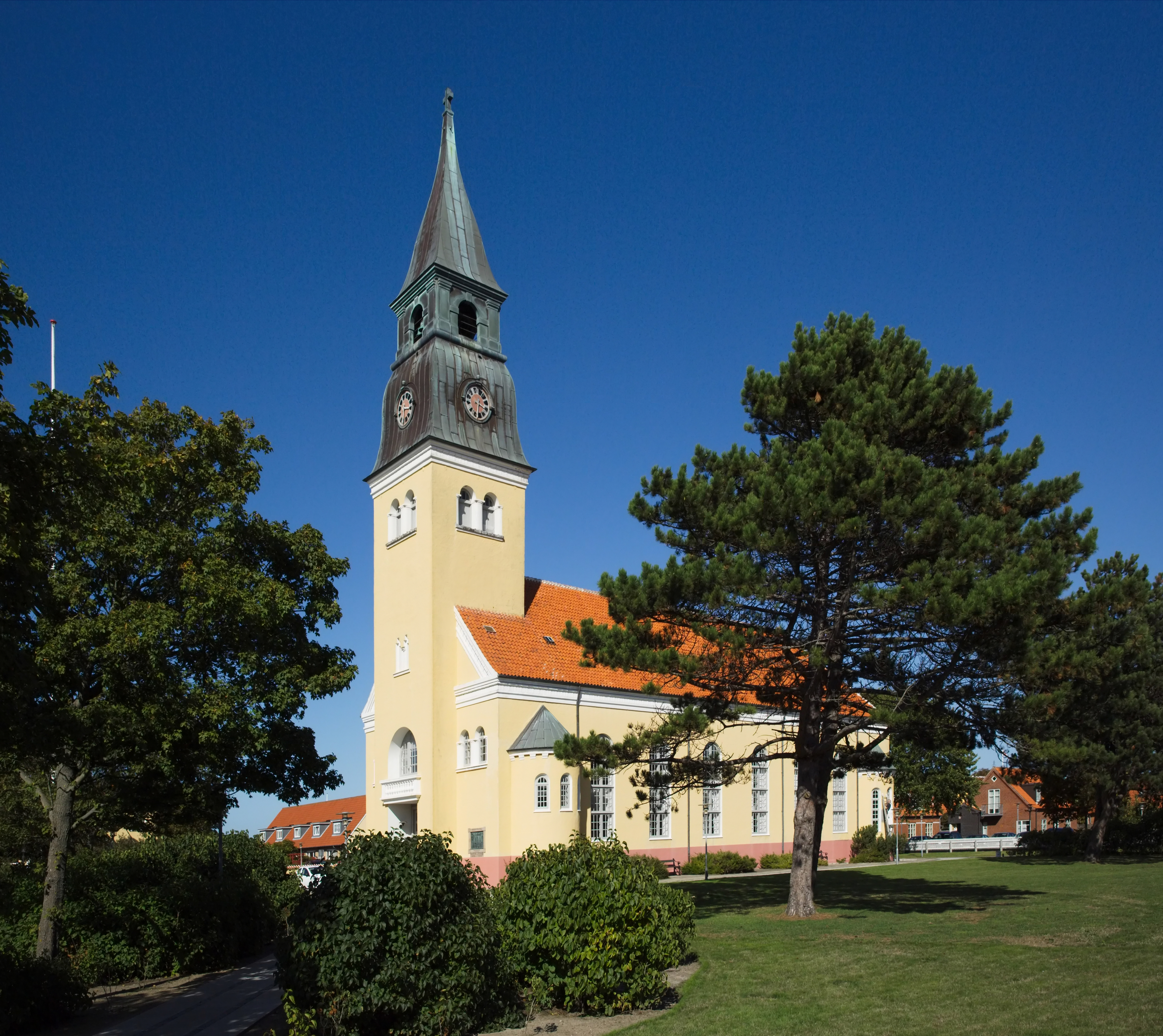
- Skagen Church
- Location: Skagen
- Country: Denmark
- Denomination: Church of Denmark

Architecture
- Architect(s): Christian Frederik Hansen, Ulrik Plesner, Thorvald Bindesbøll
- Completed: 1841

Administration
- Diocese: Diocese of Aalborg
- Deanery: Frederikshavn Provsti
- Parish: Skagen Sogn

Skagen Church (Danish: Skagen Kirke) is a church located in the historic town centre of Skagen, Denmark.

The Skagen area suffered from severe problems with sand drift up through the 18th century and in 1795 the sand covered old church had to be abandoned. It was a brick church of considerable size dedicated to Saint Lawrence which dated from the beginning of the 15th century and located 2 km south-west of the town centre.

A new church was built in 1841 to the design of the Danish Neoclassical architect Christian Frederik Hansen. The church design was adapted and expanded in 1909-10 by the Danish architect Ulrik Plesner who also designed a number of other buildings in Skagen. Plesner collaborated with the Danish architect and ornamental artist Thorvald Bindesbøll on the interior. Anne L. Hansen created interior decorations and a new colour scheme in 1989.
