= Drachmanns Hus =

Museum in Skagen, Denmark

Coordinates: 57°43′7″N 10°34′40″E

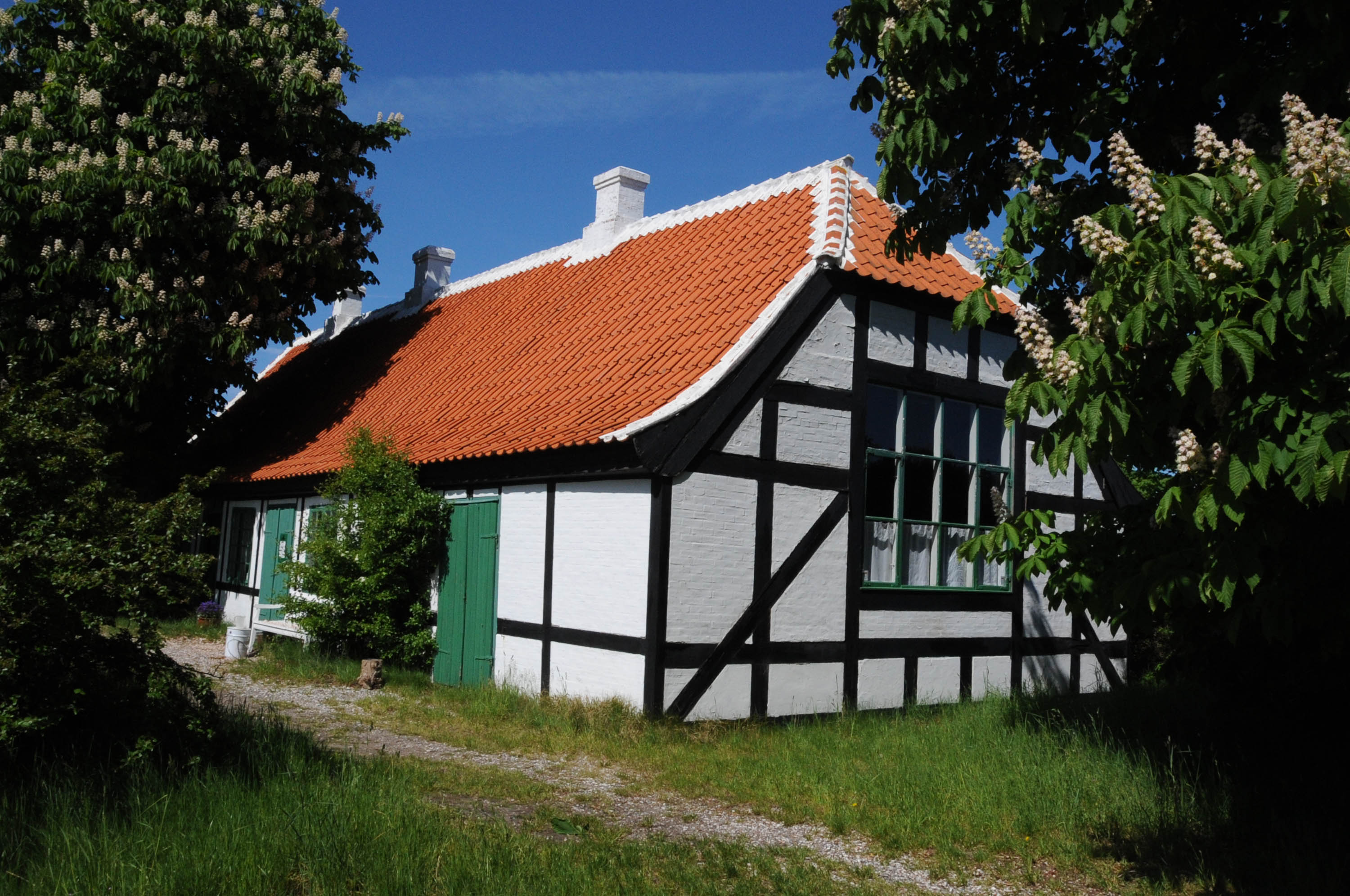
Drachmann's House

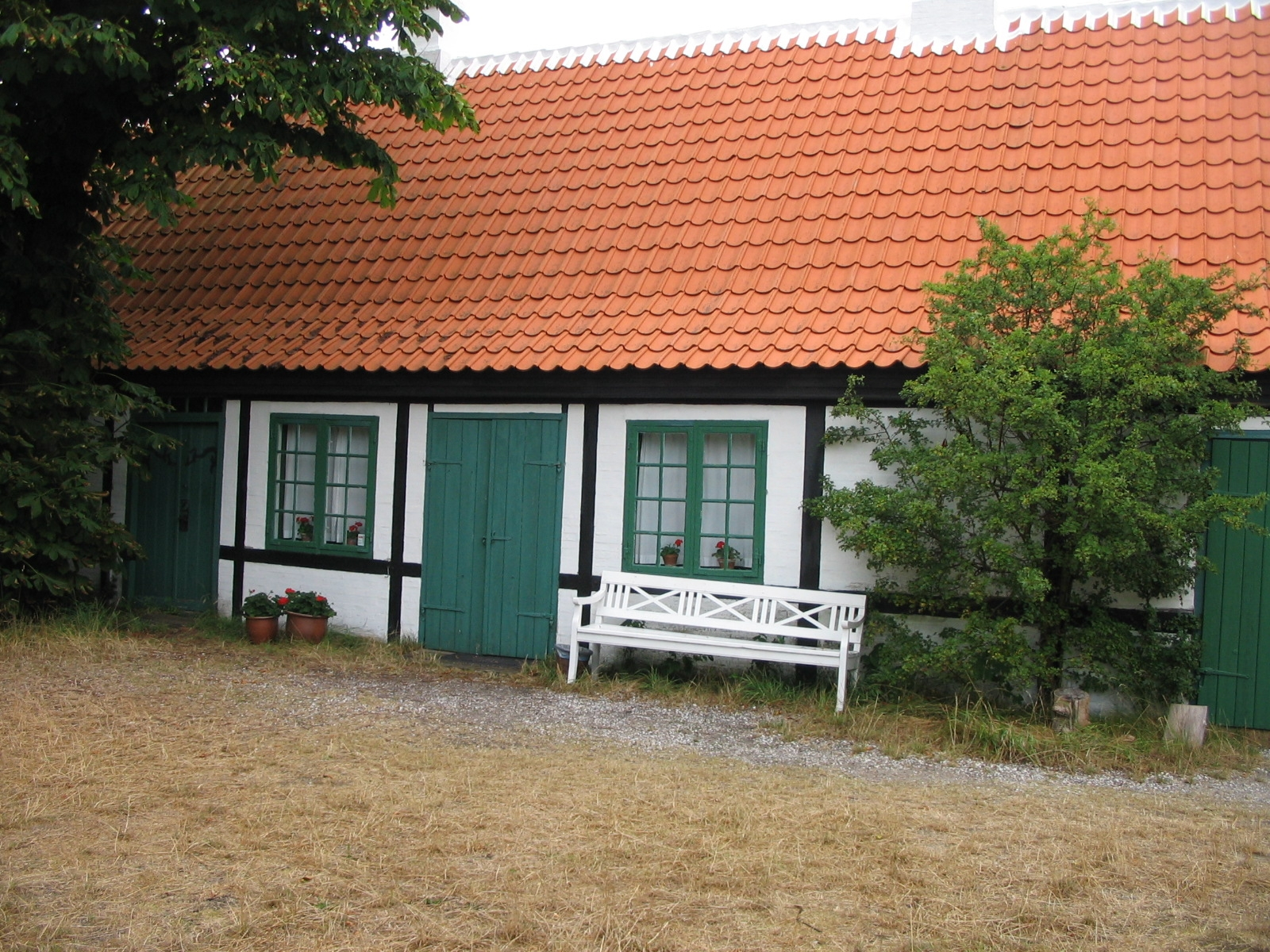
View

Drachmann's House (Danish: Drachmanns Hus), also known as Villa Pax, is one of the major houses of Skagen, northern Denmark. Located on Hans Baghs Vej towards the western side of the town, it was built in 1829 and is now a museum. It is a writer's home museum dedicated to the writer and marine painter Holger Drachmann who lived in the house from 1902 until his death in a sanatorium in Hornbæk in January 1908. Drachmann had regularly visited Skagen from 1871.

== Collection ==
Drachmann's House opened to the public on 4 June 1911 with a collection consisting mainly of his oil paintings and sketchbooks but also pictures from other artists of the colony such as P.S. Krøyer, Laurits Tuxen, and Michael Ancher and his wife Anna.

An adjacent annex to the house previously showed a photographic exhibition about Drachmann.

The house used to host a yearly "Drachmann evening" in which enthusiasts gathered together to hear readings, oral incites and music related to the writer's life and works, but the house now serves as a historic house museum.

The house was fully renovated in 2011. In 2014 it became a part of Skagens Kunstmuseer · Art Museums of Skagen alongside Anchers Hus, the art museum and former residence of the painters Michael and Anna Ancher.
