= Skagen Town and Regional Museum =

Coordinates: 57°42′59″N 10°34′31″E

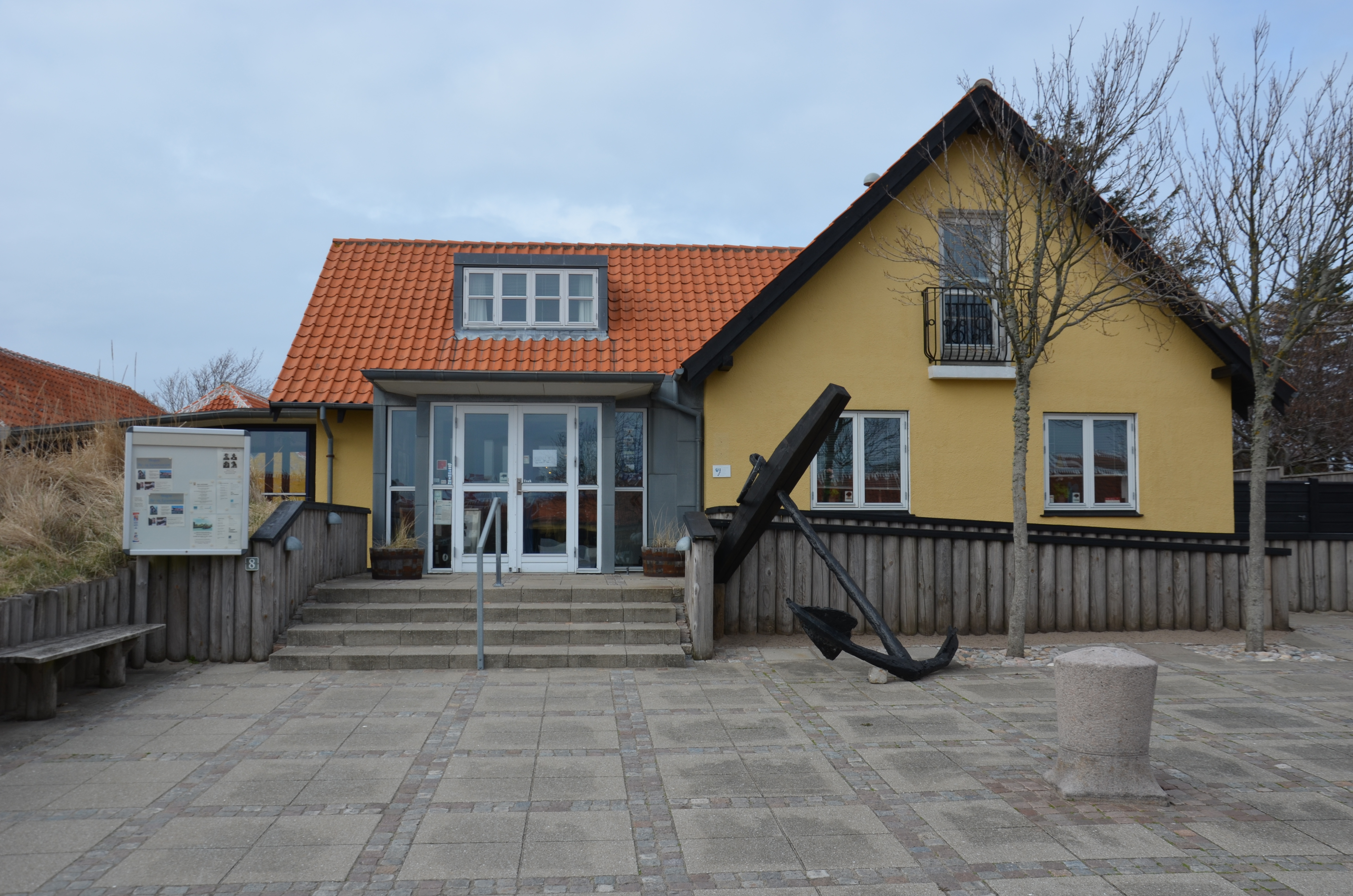
Skagen Town and Regional Museum

Skagen Town and Regional Museum (Danish: Skagen By- og Egnsmuseum) is a private museum in Skagen in the far north of Jutland, Denmark.

== History ==
The open-air museum consisting of buildings tracing the history of the town was established as Skagen Bymuseum in 1927 by the citizens of Skagen. It also has displays focusing on its fisheries, lifeboat services and navigation. Originally located in Skagen's Østerby, in 1938 it was moved to its current site on Svallerbakken in the dunes bordering Vesterby. In 1997, the name was changed to Skagen By- og Egnsmuseum. In 2009 it became associated with the region's other cultural heritage museums under the heading Nordjyllands Kystmuseum and renamed Kystmuseet Skagen.

== Collection ==
The museum consists of a number of old houses showing how fishermen and other local inhabitants lived in times gone by. It covers the town's development from the beginning of the 19th century to the present day. The country residences of the rich and the huts of poor fishermen are among the exhibits. There is also a blacksmith's shop and a lifeboat station. Indoors, there are displays of nautical artifacts, old photographs and paintings covering various periods in the history of Skagen up to the present day. There is also an old Dutch windmill on the site.

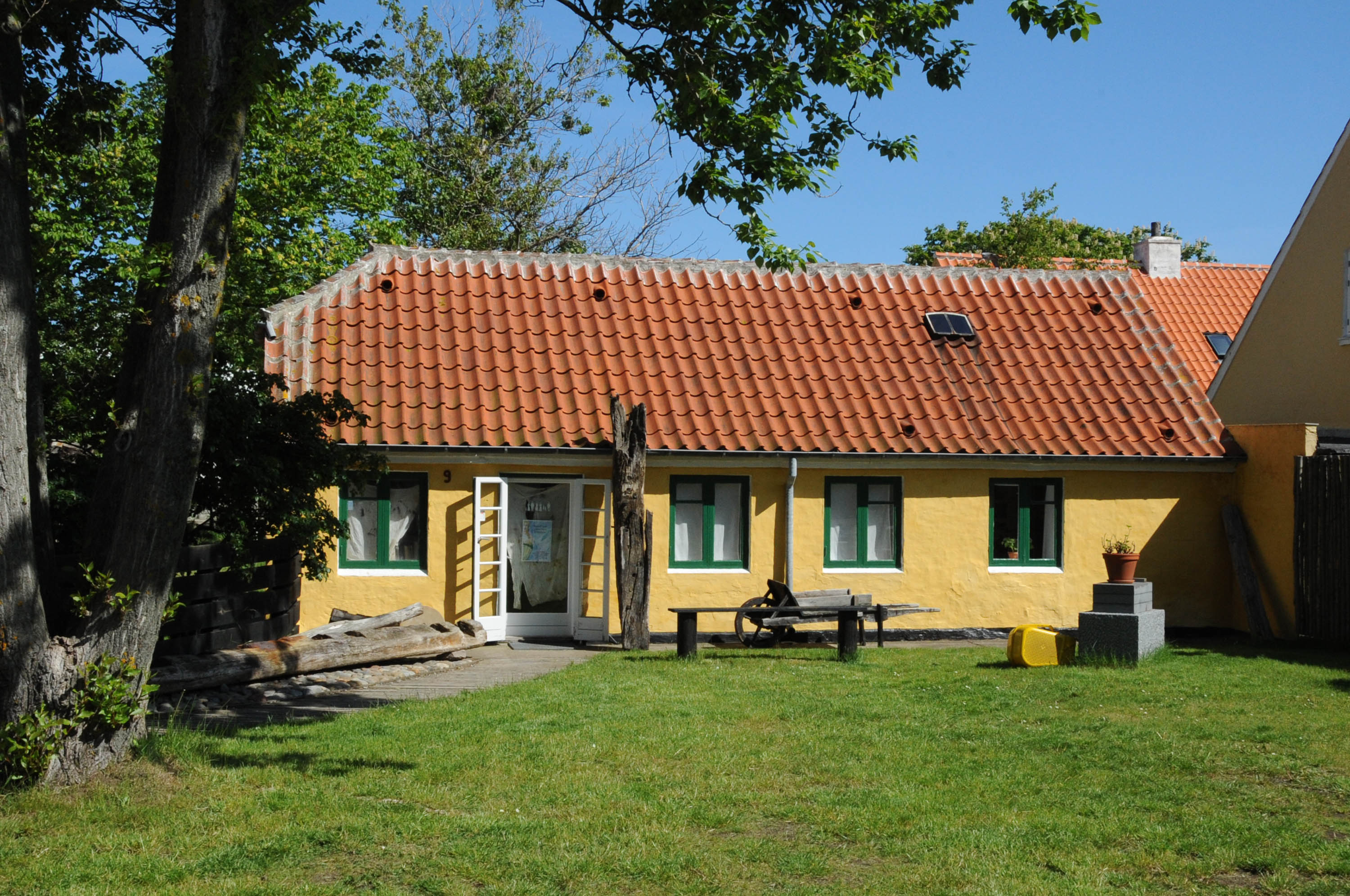
Half timbering and tiled roof house (1845)

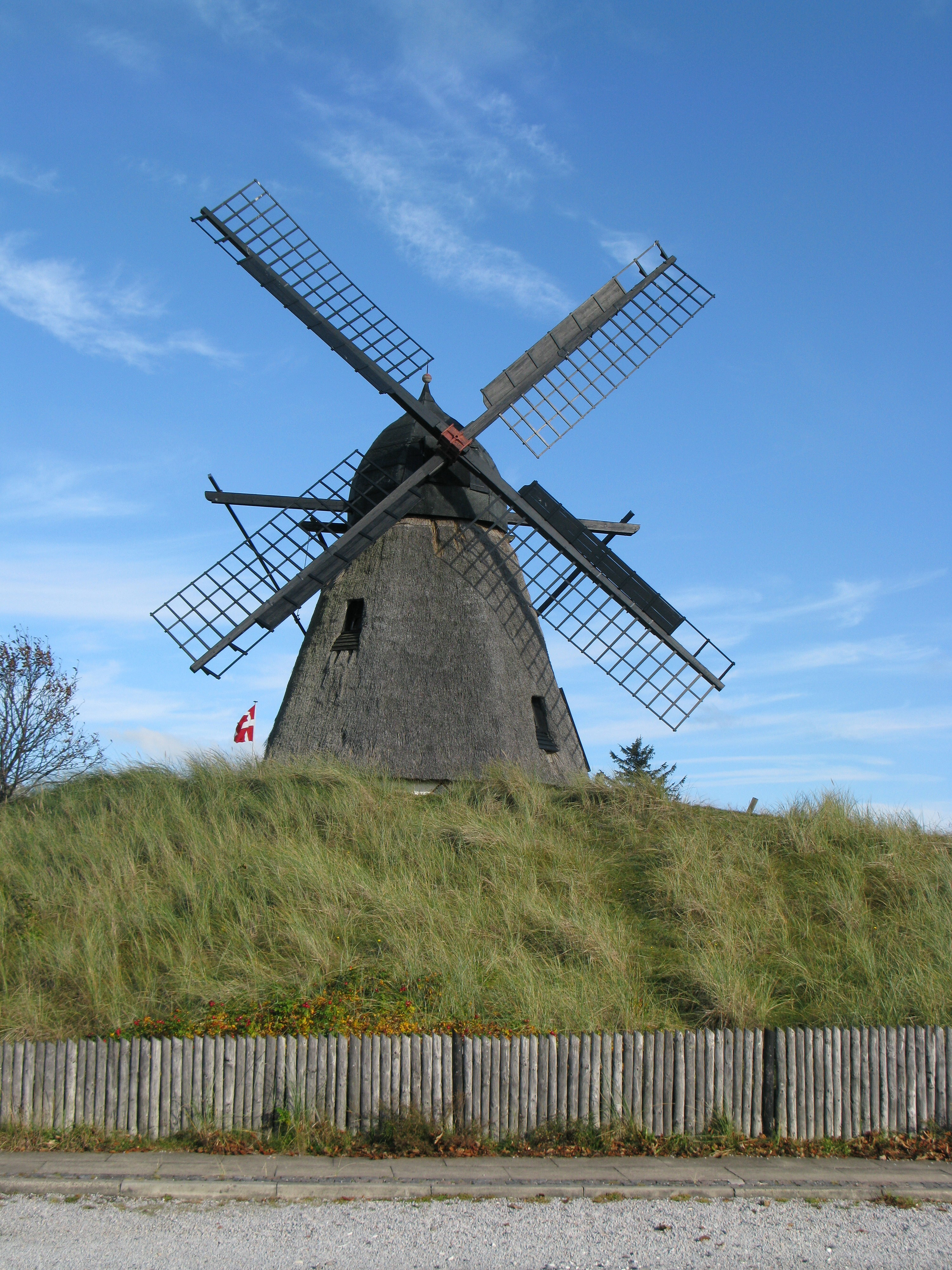
Kragskov windmill (1870)

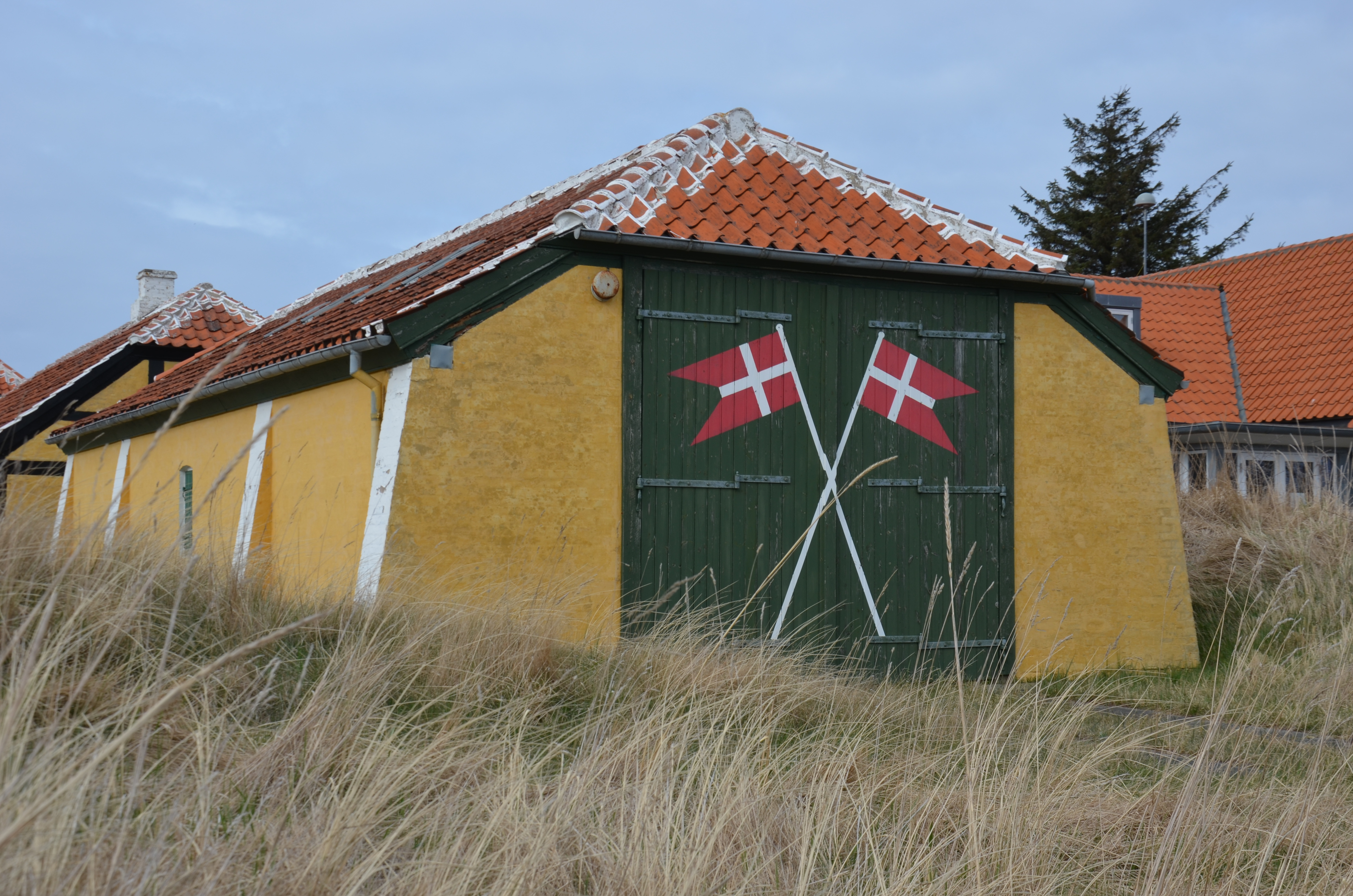
Lifeboat sea rescue station (1852)

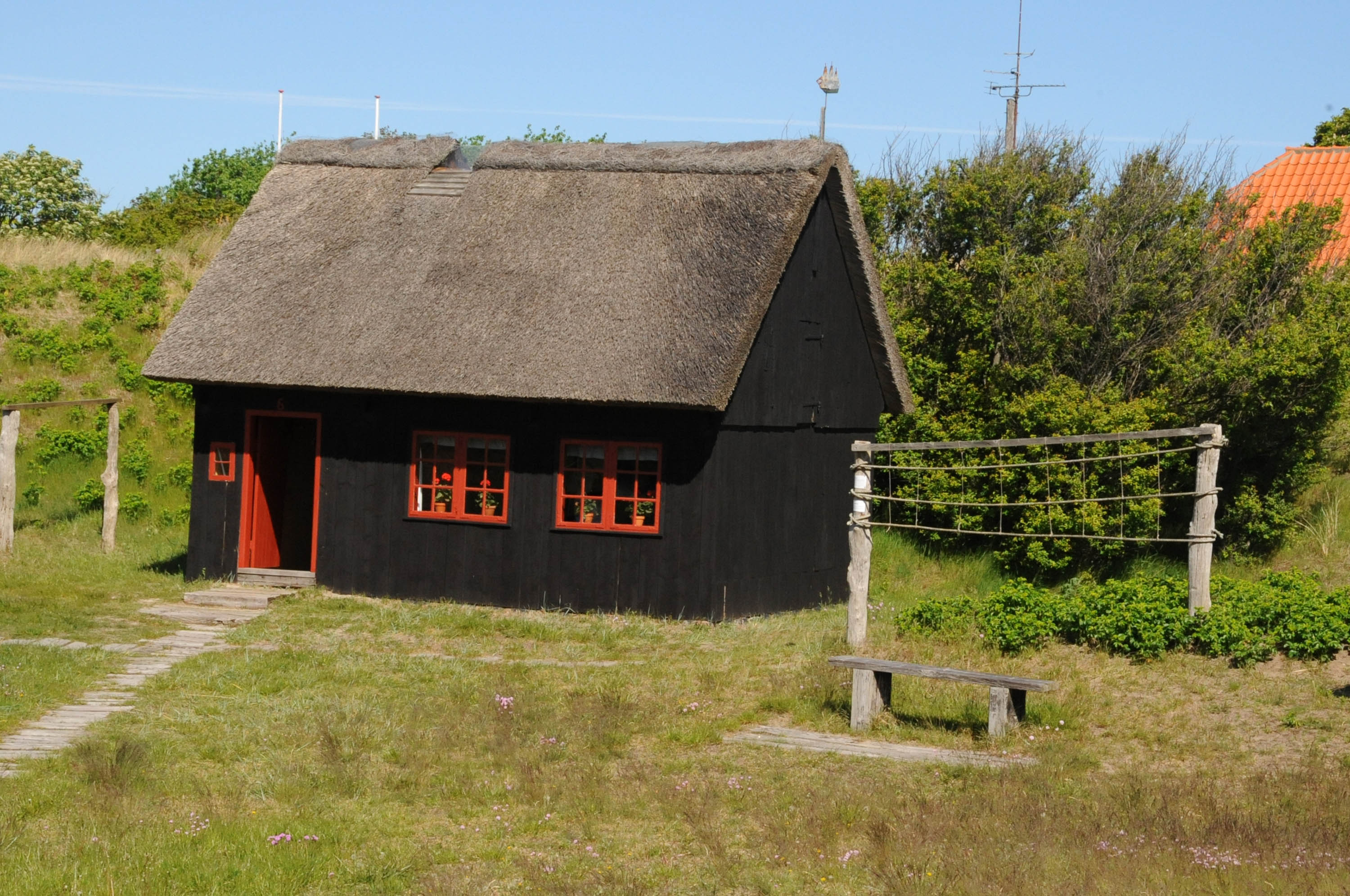
Fisherman's cottage (1808)
