= Danish national road 40 =

Road in Denmark

Danish national road number sign

Danish national road 40 (Danish: Primærrute 40), is a Danish national road in Vendsyssel in North Jutland between Skagen and Frederikshavn. The length of the road is 45 km (25 mi).

Upgrades to the sections between Ålbæk and Skagen were carried out in 2020.

== Names of the road ==
Road name (Danish)	English translation	Distance
Fyrvej	Lighthouse Road	From Grenen to Skagen East
Oddevej	Spis Road	In Skagen
Sct. Laurentii Vej	St. Lawrence Road	In Skagen
Chr. X's Vej	Christian X's Road	In Skagen
Frederikshavnsvej	Frederikshavn Road	From Skagen Downtown West to Vestre Opsyn
Ålbækvej	Aalbæk Road	From Vestre Opsyn to Ålbæk North
Skagensvej	Skagen Road	From Aalbæk North to Aalbæk South
Jerupvej	Jerup Road	From Aalbæk South to Knasborg Stream
Skagensvej	Skagen Road	From Knasborg Stream to Frederikshavn North
Gammel Torv	Old Square	In Frederikshavn
Nytorv	New Square	In Frederikshavn
Skippergade	Skipper Street	In Frederikshavn
Havnepladsen	Harbour Square	In Frederikshavn
