= Skagen Festival =

Skagen Festival is Denmark's oldest music festival having been held each summer since 1971. The annual event takes place on a number of stages in Skagen in the far north of Jutland over the first weekend of July.

== History ==
The first festival in 1971 titled "Skagen Visefestival" (Skagen Song Festival) was held in Tuxen's Villa, the former residence of Laurits Tuxen, one of the Skagen Painters. The participants came mainly from Norway and Denmark. It then moved to the Sports Center where there was more space before being held in the Skagen Kultur- og Fritidscenter. From 1996, the festival was held outdoors with tents pitched on the sand dunes or close to the harbour. It now takes place at various locations in the town and around the harbor. Initially the festival was held over the last weekend in June but since 1989, the first weekend in July has been the preferred date.

== Festival ==
The festival's slogan is "It's good to see you!", the title of Allan Taylor's song which Alex Cambell sang at the festival back in the 1970s. Some 650 volunteers get together for a week or so to make the necessary arrangements. Now an international festival, it presents various types of folk music including folk rock, jazz and blues. As well as 26 acts from Denmark, the 2014 program included four Australian acts, one from Belgium, four from England, two from Holland, seven from Ireland, one from Italy, two from Norway, two from Scotland, one from Spain, two from Sweden, one from Germany and one from the USA.

== Changing venues ==
As a result of low ticket sales in 2013, Skagen Sports Center will no longer be included as a festival venue in 2014. However, Skagen Culture and Leisure Centre, Harbour scene and Culture Kappelborg, got an extra day of play - the latter as the small intimate venue.
