= Skagen =

Northernmost town in Denmark

Skagen The Scaw
- Town
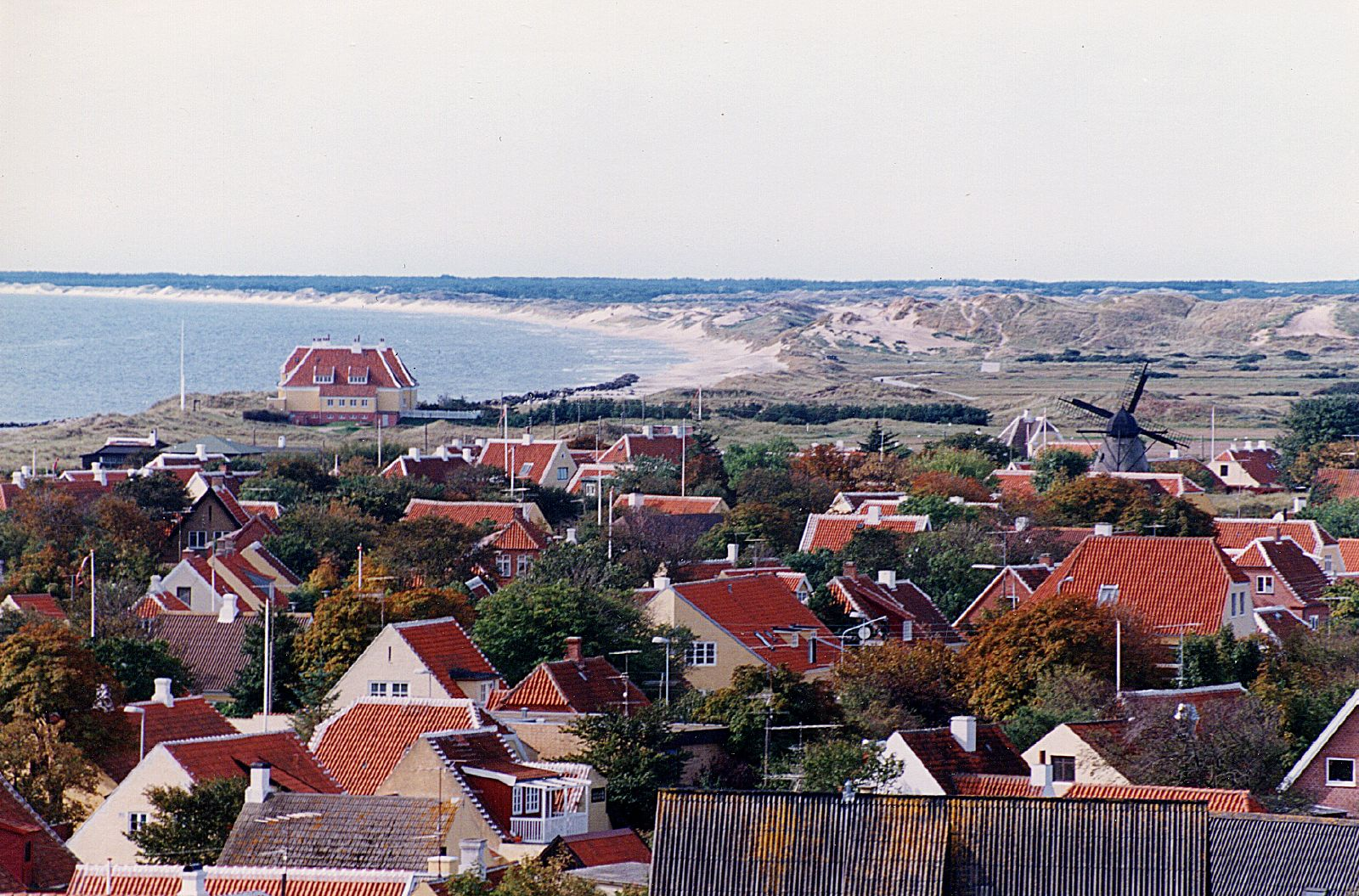

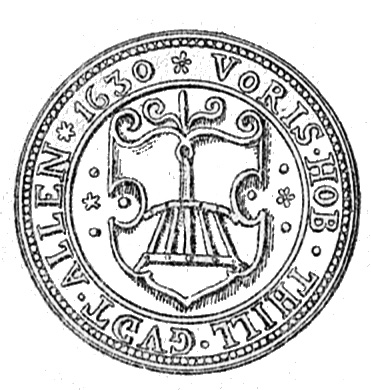
- Seal Coat of arms

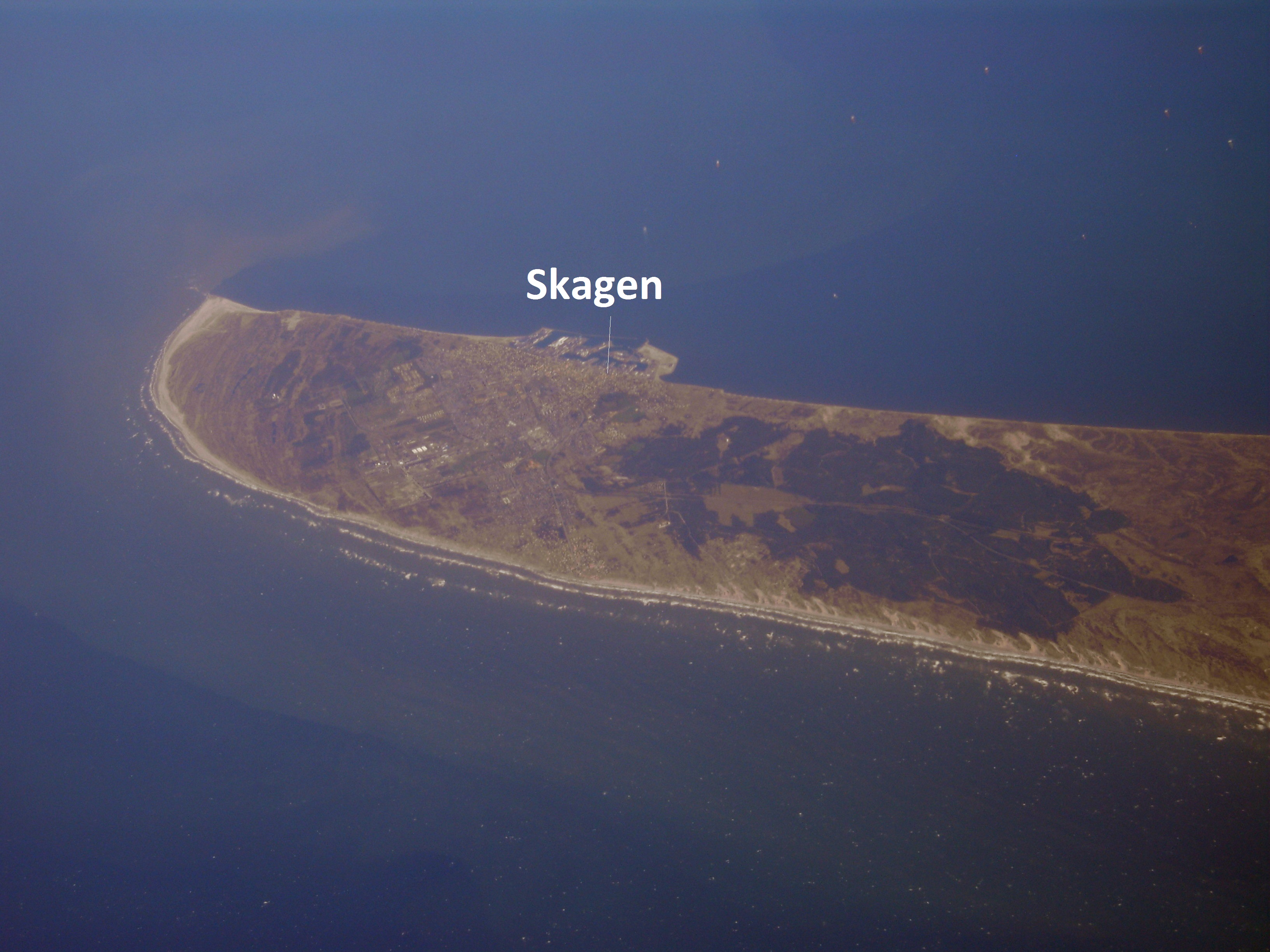
- Aerial view of the Skagen Odde peninsula in the far north of Jutland, from the southwest of Skagen

- Location in Denmark Skagen (North Jutland Region)
- Coordinates: 57°43′N 10°35′E
- Country: Denmark
- Region: North Denmark (Nordjylland)
- Municipality: Frederikshavn
- City status: 1413; 613 years ago

Government
  - Mayor: Karsten Thomsen (Frederikshavn)

Area
  - Urban: 7.81 km^{2} (3.02 sq mi)

Population (2026-01-01)
  - Urban: 7,250
  - Urban density: 928/km^{2} (2,400/sq mi)
  - Gender: 3,689 males and 3,561 females
- Demonym: Skagbo
- Time zone: UTC+1 (CET)
  - Summer (DST): UTC+2 (CEST)
- Postal code: 9990
- Website: www.skagen.dk

Skagen (Danish: [ˈskɛˀjn̩]) is the northernmost town in Denmark, on the east coast of the Skagen Odde peninsula in the far north of Jutland, part of Frederikshavn Municipality in Nordjylland, 41 kilometres (25 mi) north of Frederikshavn and 108 kilometres (67 mi) northeast of Aalborg. The Port of Skagen is Denmark's main fishing port and it also has a thriving tourist industry, attracting 2 million people annually.

The name was applied originally to the peninsula but it now also refers to the town. The settlement began during the Middle Ages as a fishing village, renowned for its herring industry. Thanks to its seascapes, fishermen and evening light, towards the end of the 19th century it became popular with a group of impressionist artists now known as the Skagen Painters. In 1879, the Skagen Fishermen's Association was established with the purpose of facilitating the local fishing industry through the Skagensbanen railway, which opened as a narrow-gauged railway in 1890. The modern port of Skagen opened on 20 November 1907, and with the railway connections to Frederikshavn and the rest of Denmark, tourism began to develop.

Between the 1930s and 1950s, the town grew rapidly, with the population more than doubling from 4,048 in 1930 to 9,009 in 1955. Skagen reached a maximum population of 14,050 in 1980, after which it gradually declined. As of January 2026, it has a population of 7,250. Thanks to the artistic community that still remains in Skagen, the local arts and crafts trade remains important to the income of the town with its numerous crafts shops and galleries. Chains such as the international jeweller Skagen Designs have branches in the town, and given the abundance of fresh fish coming in at the port of Skagen, seafood forms a staple in Skagen's restaurants.

St Lawrence's Church was built just outside the village at the end of the 14th century, but after it was buried in drifting sand it was replaced by Skagen Church in 1841 designed by Christian Frederik Hansen. It was redeveloped in 1909–10 by Ulrik Plesner who also designed a number of other buildings in Skagen, including Klitgaarden and the railway station. Several landmarks in the town are closely associated with the Skagen Painters who used to frequent them, including Brøndums Hotel, Skagens Museum, Michael and Anna Ancher's House, and Drachmann's House.

Skagen station is the most northerly railway station in Denmark and is the terminus of the Skagensbanen. Nordjyske Jernbaner operates the local train service between Skagen, Frederikshavn and Aalborg with onward national connections by DSB. From Frederikshavn, there are ferries to Gothenburg, Oslo and Læsø. Aalborg Airport is 100 km (62 mi) southwest of Skagen.

== History ==
=== Early history ===
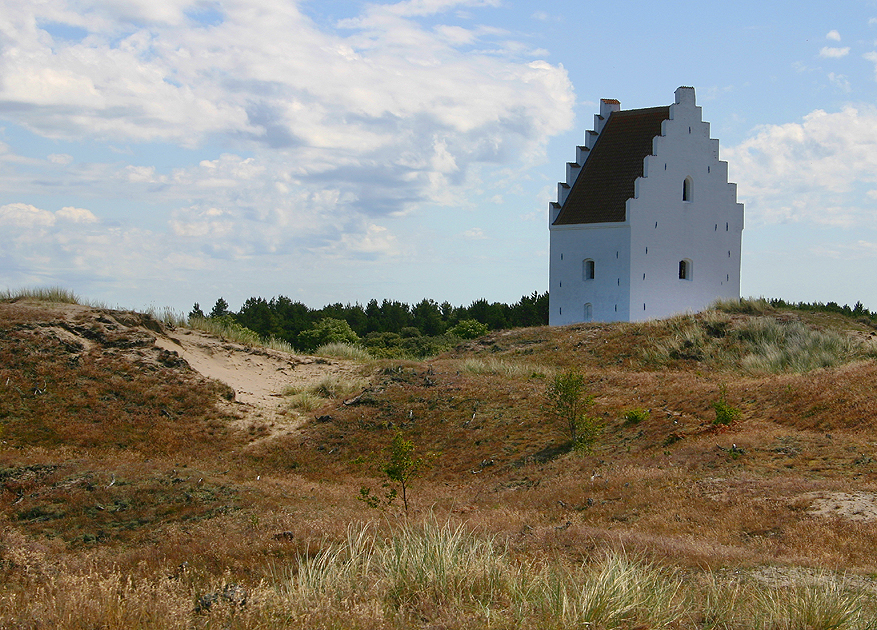
The sand-engulfed Buried Church (tilsandede kirke) at Skagen

Skagen was mentioned as far back as the first century AD by Pliny the Elder:

Promenturium Cimbrorum excurrens in maria longe paeninsulam efficit quae Tastris appellatur

— Book IV, 97
Translation:

The promontory of the Cimbri running far out into the seas makes a peninsula, which is called Tastris.

This is the only time the name Tastris is mentioned but Skagen itself, first documented as Skaffuen in 1284, simply means 'narrow, high point of land'.

The first building in the area, dating from the 12th century, was in Højen on the west side of the peninsula. It belonged to Tronder, a shepherd who also became Skagen's first fisherman. Around 1340, Vesterby, on the east coast (to the south west of today's harbour), developed into the main village. Further to the south west, St Lawrence's Church was built at the end of the 14th century. In 1413, Erik of Pommern granted Skagen the status of market town with the result that for a time it became Vendsyssel's largest community with up to 2,000 inhabitants.

In 1549, a grammar school was opened (closing again in 1739) and, in 1561, Skagen's first lighthouse was constructed. In 1568, some 350 fishing boats and merchant ships were wrecked off the coast of Skagen. In the 1590s, successive storms led not only to numerous drownings but to flooding, destroying many of the houses. In 1591, 22 died in a flood and in 1593, 14 houses were washed away. In 1595, 25 farms in the area were covered in drifting sand.

=== 17th–19th centuries ===
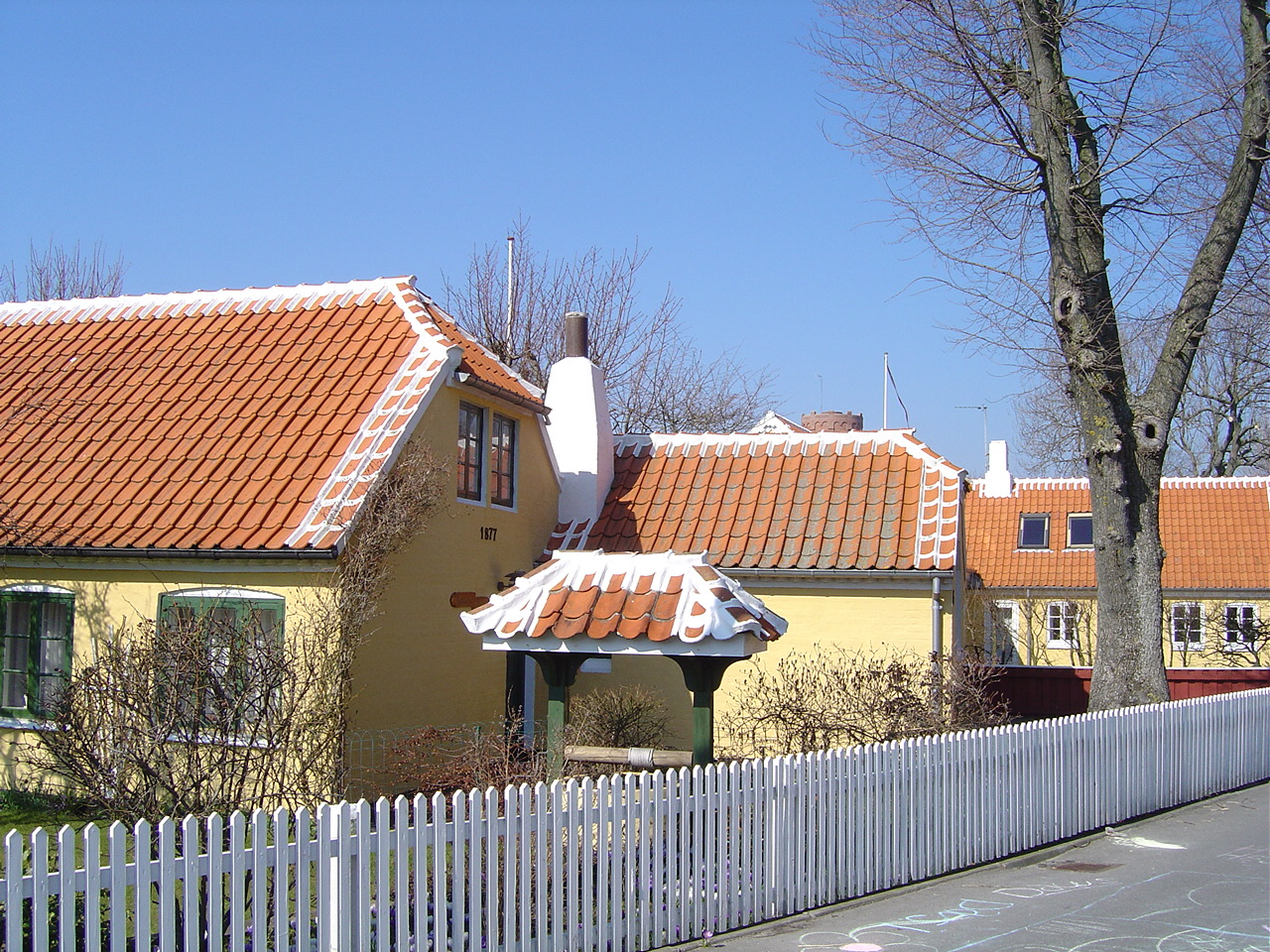
Typical Skagen house: red tiled roof with white trimmings, yellow-plastered walls and a white fence

In the 17th century, fishing suffered from a decline in herring stocks. Shortly after the beginning of the Torstensson War, the Swedish army arrived in Skagen in January 1644, plundering the town. Skagen's White Lighthouse with adjoining accommodation for the keeper was built in 1747. In 1775, accumulations of drifting sand made it difficult to access St Lawrence's Church, finally leading to its closure and partial demolition in 1795. Its remaining artefacts were sold by auction in 1810. St Lawrence's was replaced by Skagen Church, completed in 1841 and redesigned in the local style by Ulrik Plesner in 1910.

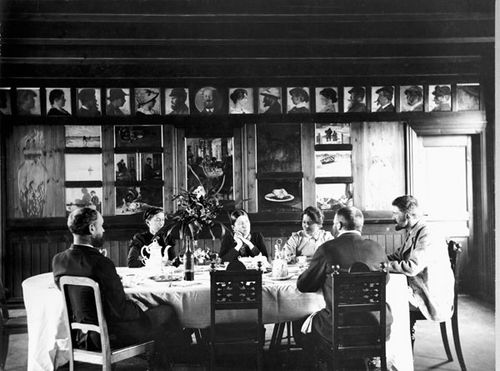
Skagen Painters in the Dining room in Brøndums Hotel, Skagen, c. 1891

On a single day in 1825, 23 ships were left stranded off the coast. In 1833, Martinus Rørbye became the first artist to paint the fishermen and landscapes of Skagen, almost half a century before the arrival of the Skagen Painters. Skagen Church was inaugurated in 1841, and the first guest house in the town opened in 1844. In 1858, the grey lighthouse was inaugurated. The same year, bye-laws were established specifying building requirements including the completion of tiled roofs within five years. Skagen was struck by the cholera epidemic of 1853.

Hans Christian Andersen visited the town in 1859. During his stay at Brøndums Hotel, the future painter Anna Ancher, daughter of the inn-keeper, was born. In 1871, the author Holger Drachmann and the painters Fritz Thaulow and Karl Madsen arrived in Skagen, the first of the colony of artists that became known as the Skagen Painters. They were followed by Carl Locher in 1872, Michael Ancher in 1874 and Peder Severin Krøyer in 1882.

In 1879, the Skagen Fisherman's Association was established with the purpose of facilitating the local fishing industry through the railway. In 1890, the Skagensbanen narrow-gauge railway from Frederikshavn finally arrived in Skagen, connecting the town to the rest of Denmark. The tracks were widened in 1916 to avoid the need to transfer cargoes of fish in Frederikshavn. Many of the town's typical yellow-plastered houses with red roofs that grew up along Sankt Laurentii Vej from 1890 to 1930 were designed by Ulrik Plesner. He was also the architect behind many other buildings in the town, including the railway station, Brøndums Hotel and Skagen Museum. Skagen Missionshus was opened in 1896.

=== 20th century ===
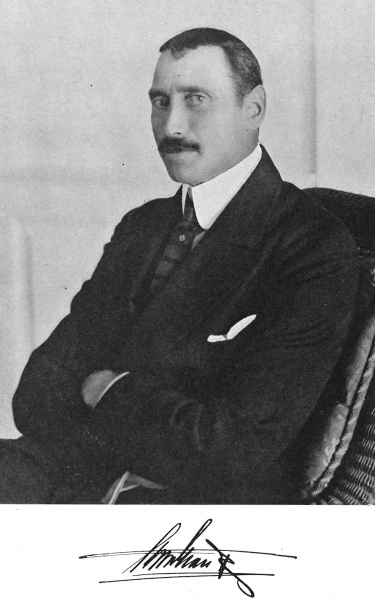
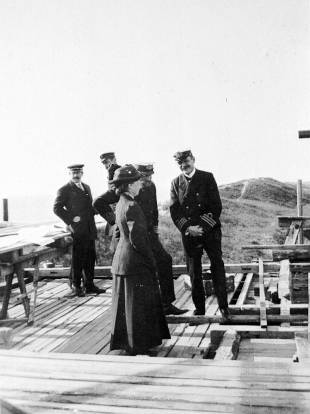
Left: Christian X of Denmark. Right: Queen Alexandrine at Skagen in 1913

In 1904–1907, the fishing harbour was built with inner and outer sections under the patronage of hydraulic engineer Palle Bruun. It was inaugurated on 20 November 1907, and later additions were made for cold storage and the fish processing industry. The distinctive warehouses next to the harbour were designed by Thorvald Bindesbøll.

In the early 1910s, Christian X and Queen Alexandrine often visited Skagen in the royal yacht Kongeskibet Dannebrog. Occasionally they arrived by train and brought friends from other European monarchies and stayed at the Brøndums and Grenen hotels. They grew fond of the place, befriending many of the artists in Skagen. Christian X bought up land in the vicinity and built the summer residence Klitgaarden as a gift for his wife. Designed by Ulrik Plesner, with furniture provided by Marie Krøyer, the villa was inaugurated on 11 April 1914, with the town celebrating the royal opening with many flags. Klitgaarden was further embellished inside by local artists. It passed to Prince Knud and Princess Caroline Mathilde, and after Caroline's death in 1995, it was converted into a villa retreat for scholars in 2000. Composer Carl Nielsen also frequented Skagen in his youth, and he purchased a plot of land on Vestre Strandvej at Vesterby in 1918 with his sculptor wife Anne Marie Carl-Nielsen, using one of the two small half-timbered houses there as a residence and studio. They named it "Finis Terrae", meaning "end of the world". The Nielsen family owned the property until 1957 when they sold it to Frode Jensen, a machinery manufacturer.

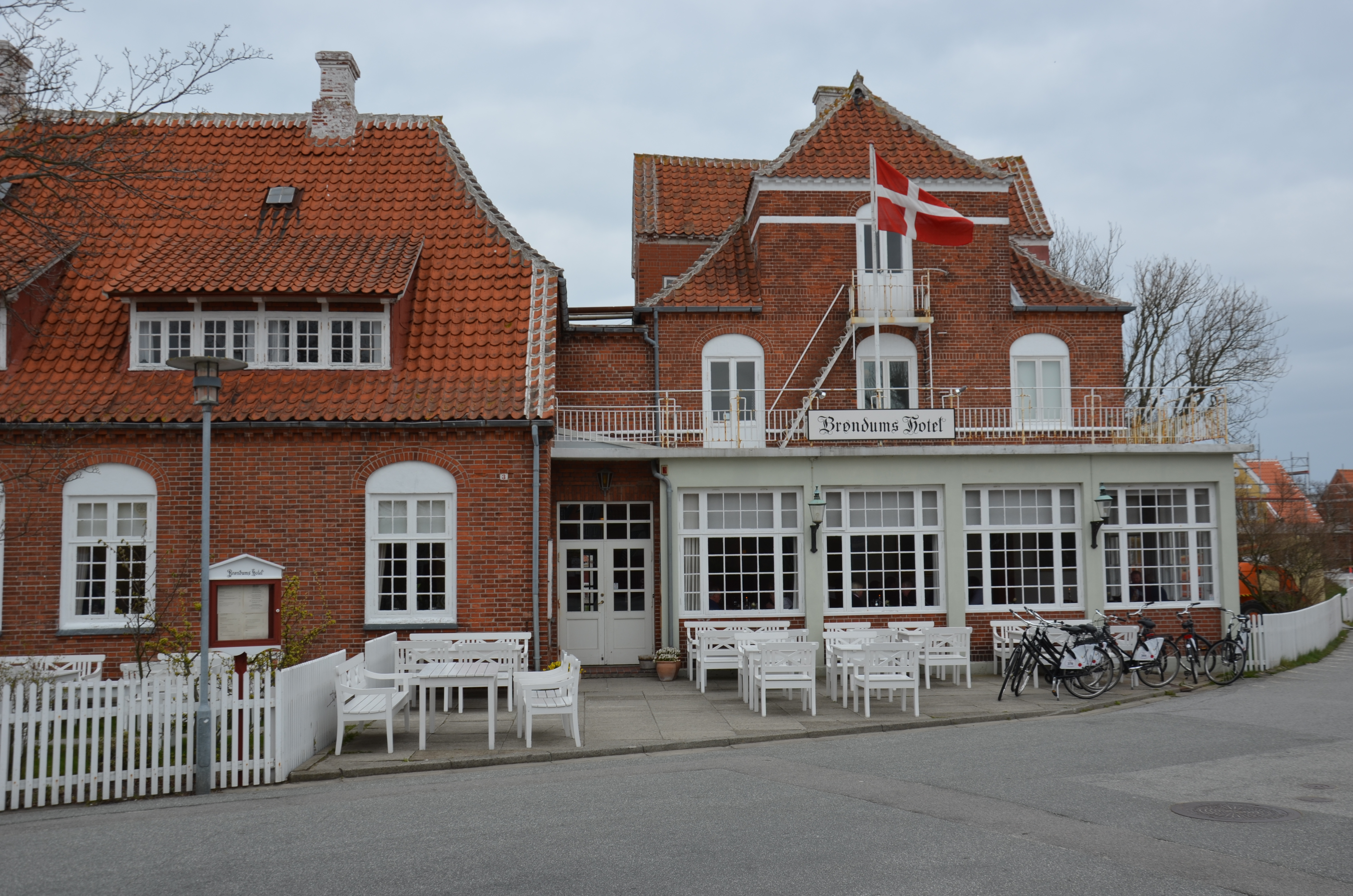
Brøndums Hotel

In the 1930s, development of the town as a tourist attraction led to the opening of new hotels. In 1931, the residents of Skagen and their famous friends campaigned for a monument to be established on the square in the town, commemorating the fishermen and lifeboatmen of Jutland. Anne Marie Carl-Nielsen was commissioned to erect a 3 metres (9.8 ft) bronze statue of a lifeboatman in garb, holding a lifeline. The monument was showcased at the Free Exhibition Hall in Copenhagen in the spring of 1931, before fundraising enabled it to be brought by sea to Skagen on 10 November 1932. In October 1938, lightning struck the Skagens Badehotel, affecting the wing with the salons and music rooms. During World War II, the hotel was taken over by the Germans, until it was demolished in 1943. Further facilities were developed in the 1950s. From the 1960s, housing estates were constructed to the north, forming a built-up area extending to Højen. Anna and Michael Ancher's house was opened as a museum (1967) and the new town hall was completed in 1969. The Skagen Festival was founded in 1971, making it the oldest music festival in the country. The primary genre is folk music. In 1977, Drachmanns House was broken into and four paintings were stolen, and then in 1980, a painting by Christian Krohg was stolen from Skagens Museum.

Several fires and industrial incidents occurred in the 1980s. In 1981, an oil slick affected the coastline of Skagen municipality, and in 1985 a pipe bomb exploded at Ankermedet School. Skagen ice factory was affected by a chemical incident in 1989. A new shrimp factory opened in the industrial area in 1991, while the local cinema was closed in 1993. There was a major fire on the Hulsig Heath dunes in 1996.

== Skagen Painters ==
P. S. Krøyer: Hip, Hip, Hurrah! (1888)

The Skagen Painters were a group of Scandinavian artists who visited the area every summer from the late 1870s until the turn of the century. They were attracted by the scenery, the fishermen and the social community of their fellow artists who encouraged them to paint en plein air following the example of the French Impressionists while sometimes adopting the Realist approach of the Barbizon School. They broke away from the rigid traditions of the Danish and Swedish art academies, preferring the modern trends they had experienced in Paris.

The group was reputed to have adopted a bohemian lifestyle. It encompassed not only painters, but also writers, and other influential people. While only a few were full-time residents of the area, they were often joined by family and friends, especially during the summer months. The group initially revolved around Michael Ancher and his future wife Anna, the only member of the group who was a native of Skagen. P. S. Krøyer, who arrived in 1882, was perhaps the most colourful member of the group. His painting Hip, Hip, Hurrah! shows several of the artists celebrating around a table out in the garden. The painters included the Swedes Oscar Björck and Johan Krouthén, the Norwegians Christian Krohg and Eilif Peterssen, and the Danes Karl Madsen, Laurits Tuxen, Marie Triepcke Krøyer Alfvén, Carl Locher, Viggo Johansen and Thorvald Niss. The group also included the writers Holger Drachmann, Georg Brandes and Henrik Pontoppidan and the Swedish composer Hugo Alfvén. They often gathered in Brøndums Hotel whose dining room now forms part of Skagens Museum.

In 1890, the railway to Skagen not only led to the expansion of the village but also brought in considerable numbers of tourists. It was largely responsible for breaking up the regular summer meetings of the artists' colony as they could no longer find suitable accommodation and venues for their meetings. However, some of them purchased homes in Skagen: P. S. Krøyer in 1894, Laurits Tuxen in 1901, Holger Drachmann in 1903. Anna and Michael Ancher, Krøyer and Tuxen continued to paint in Skagen until well into the 20th century and were occasionally joined by their earlier friends. Other painters, sometimes referred to as the younger group of Skagen painters, continued to visit the area. They included Jørgen Aabye, Tupsy and Gad Frederik Clement, Ella Heide, Frederik Lange and Johannes Wilhjelm, some of whom settled in the area until the 1930s or even later. Skagens Museum has a large collection of works from all the recognized artists who painted in Skagen.

== Geography ==
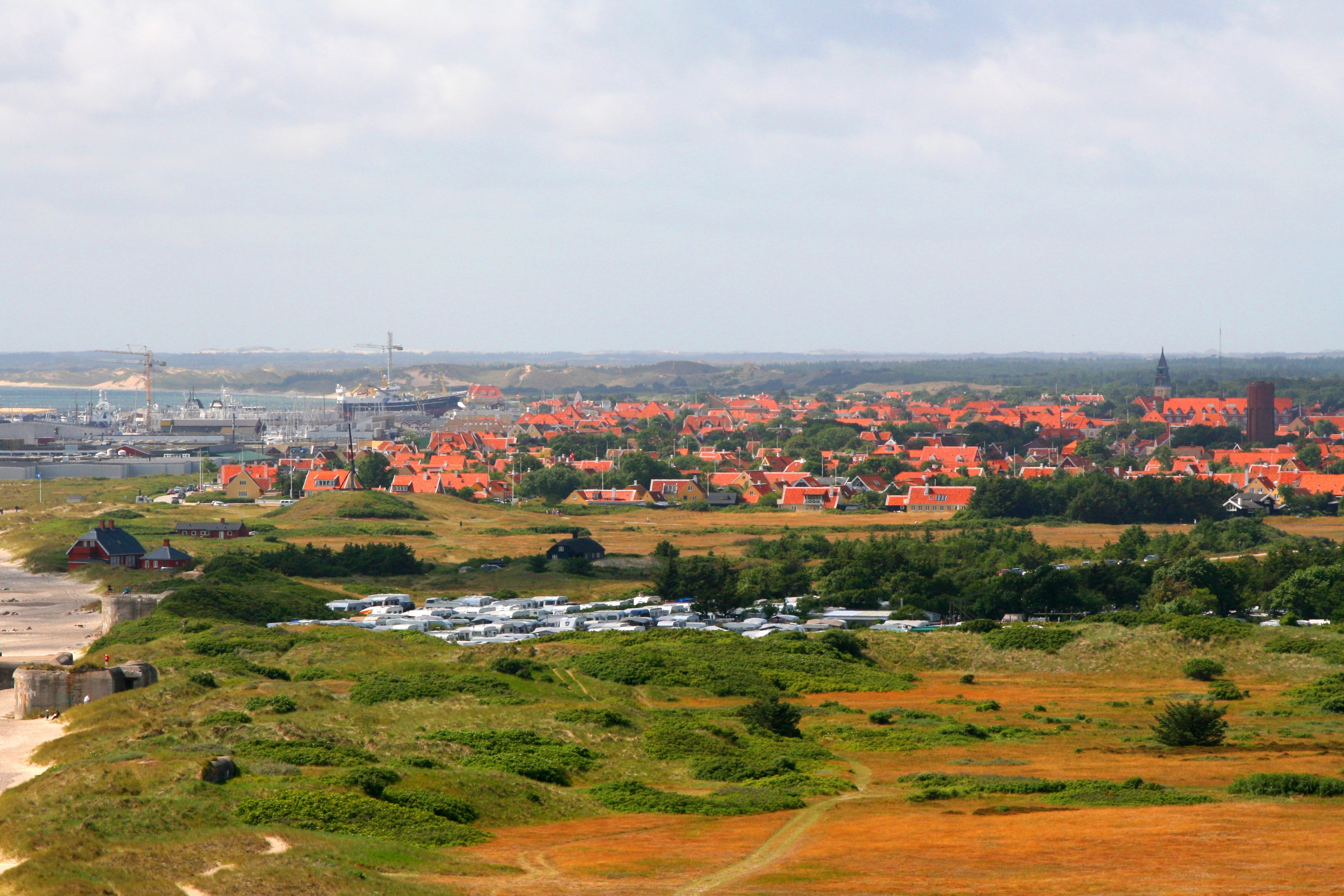
View of Skagen from the north

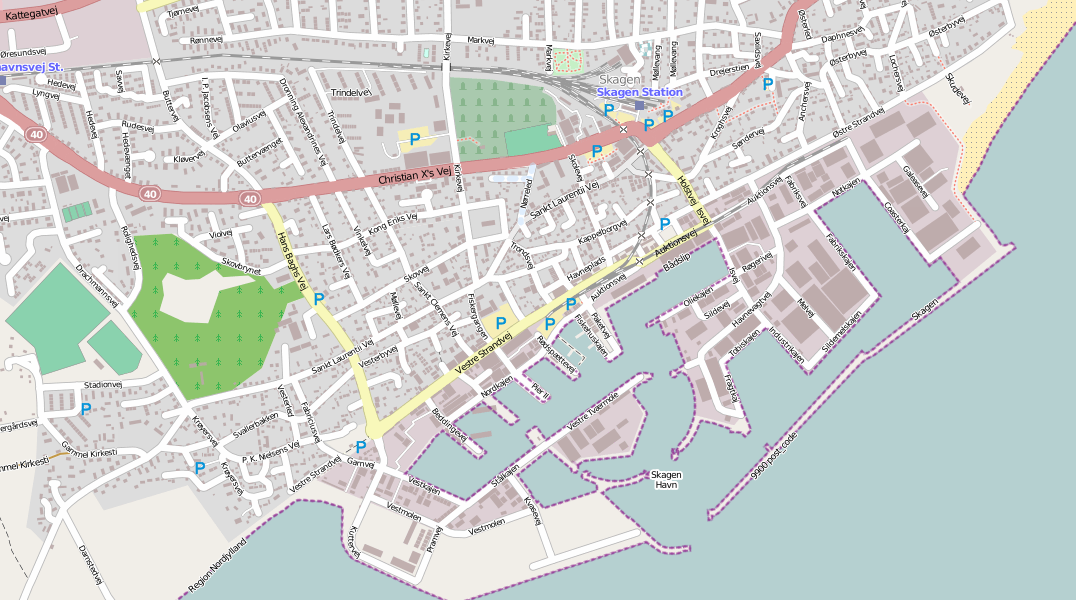
Street map of the main area of Skagen.

Skagen is Denmark's northernmost town, located 41 kilometres (25 mi) north of Frederikshavn, 108 kilometres (67 mi) northeast of Aalborg, and 226 kilometres (140 mi) northeast of Aarhus by road. It takes its name from the peninsula that projects into the waters between the North Sea and the straits of Denmark. The oldest areas lie along the south coast. Gammel Skagen (Old Skagen), also known as Højen, is located next to Nordstrand on the western side. Vesterby and Østerby are notable for their little fishermen's cottages and narrow streets. Danish national road 40 to Frederikshavn passes through Skagen.

Grenen (also known as the Skagen Odde peninsula) is bordered by Ålbæk Bay (Ålbæk Bugt) to the east on the Kattegat and Tannis Bay (Tannis Bugt) to the west on the Skagerrak. The area is picturesque, and distinguished by its low, yellow houses with red tile roofs nestled into the beach areas. The wild landscape was largely formed by a severe process of desertification in the 18th and 19th centuries. Problems with moving dunes and desertification were subsequently brought under control in the latter 19th and early 20th centuries by establishing large plantations of grasses, bushes and fir trees. Two significant migratory dunes remain in the area, one of which is the enormous Råbjerg Mile.

== Climate ==
Being surrounded by the sea in three directions, Skagen has a cool oceanic climate (Cfb) with a lack of temperature extremes. Its maritime and moderated characteristics is shared with the rest of the country. Skagen is Denmark's sunniest town with an average of 306 hours of sunshine in the holiday month of July, higher than the 276 hours recorded for Bornholm's Østerlars.

Climate data for Skagen (1971–2000)
Month	Jan	Feb	Mar	Apr	May	Jun	Jul	Aug	Sep	Oct	Nov	Dec	Year
Record high °C (°F)	10.2 (50.4)	11.5 (52.7)	15.7 (60.3)	19.0 (66.2)	23.6 (74.5)	27.1 (80.8)	28.2 (82.8)	29.0 (84.2)	22.6 (72.7)	19.0 (66.2)	13.2 (55.8)	11.1 (52.0)	29.0 (84.2)
Mean daily maximum °C (°F)	3.0 (37.4)	2.7 (36.9)	4.6 (40.3)	8.4 (47.1)	13.7 (56.7)	17.2 (63.0)	19.5 (67.1)	19.2 (66.6)	15.5 (59.9)	11.4 (52.5)	7.3 (45.1)	4.7 (40.5)	10.6 (51.1)
Daily mean °C (°F)	1.4 (34.5)	1.0 (33.8)	2.5 (36.5)	5.6 (42.1)	10.5 (50.9)	14.0 (57.2)	16.3 (61.3)	16.2 (61.2)	13.1 (55.6)	9.5 (49.1)	5.7 (42.3)	3.1 (37.6)	8.2 (46.8)
Mean daily minimum °C (°F)	−0.7 (30.7)	−1.1 (30.0)	0.3 (32.5)	2.9 (37.2)	7.5 (45.5)	10.9 (51.6)	13.1 (55.6)	13.0 (55.4)	10.4 (50.7)	7.1 (44.8)	3.6 (38.5)	1.0 (33.8)	5.7 (42.3)
Record low °C (°F)	−16.5 (2.3)	−15.0 (5.0)	−10.8 (12.6)	−4.8 (23.4)	−3.0 (26.6)	3.2 (37.8)	6.0 (42.8)	5.5 (41.9)	1.3 (34.3)	−2.6 (27.3)	−5.8 (21.6)	−12.4 (9.7)	−16.5 (2.3)
Average precipitation mm (inches)	52.4 (2.06)	32.1 (1.26)	40.4 (1.59)	33.7 (1.33)	43.6 (1.72)	54.6 (2.15)	48.8 (1.92)	61.9 (2.44)	75.5 (2.97)	75.6 (2.98)	66.1 (2.60)	58.5 (2.30)	643.2 (25.32)
Average precipitation days (≥ 0.1 mm)	16.5	12.3	13.7	11.2	11.1	11.8	10.1	11.8	14.4	16.0	16.6	16.7	162.3
Average snowy days	5.8	4.6	3.7	1.2	0.0	0.0	0.0	0.0	0.0	0.1	1.2	3.7	20.3
Average relative humidity (%)	93	91	91	87	86	87	87	87	87	88	90	92	89
Mean monthly sunshine hours	59	77	135	194	291	274	306	257	164	101	56	48	1,969
Source: Danish Meteorological Institute (humidity 1978–1997)

== Demographics ==
The population of Skagen has mostly grown steadily, reaching a peak of 14,050 people in 1980, but has shown a marked decline in the 21st century. In 1672 Skagen had a population of 1,004, but by 1781 this had declined to 650. The 1801 population of 834 began to grow significantly in subsequent decades, reaching 1,052 people in 1824 and jumping to 1,632 by 1840. By 1850, it had dropped to 1,400, after which it again began to grow steadily.

Major growth occurred in the 1870s and 1880s, with the population growing from 1,615 in 1870 to 1,954 in 1880 and 2,323 in 1890. Several of the new inhabitants were artists, who significantly altered the ethnic composition of Skagen, as they brought their friends and families from abroad to join the colony at Skagen. Noticeable change occurred between 1901 and 1906, when the population grew from 2,438 to 2,936, and again in the late 1910s, growing from 3,212 in 1916 to 3,854 in 1921. Major growth began to take place in the 1930s and 1940s in Skagen, which grew from 4,048 inhabitants in 1930 to 5,358 in 1940. Skagen's population more than doubled between 1930 and 1955 reaching a population of 9,009.

By 1960, Skagen had 10,213 inhabitants, growing to 11,253 in 1965. Following a municipal merger in 1971, the population jumped from 11,749 to 13,513. The population grew very steadily, reaching a peak of 14,050 in 1980. There has since been a steady decline, with 13,724 people recorded in 1990, 13,298 in 1994, and 12,691 in 2000. In the 2000s, the permanent population of Skagen has shown a marked decline, falling from 12,213 in 2003 to 8,088 inhabitants in 2017.

== Economy ==
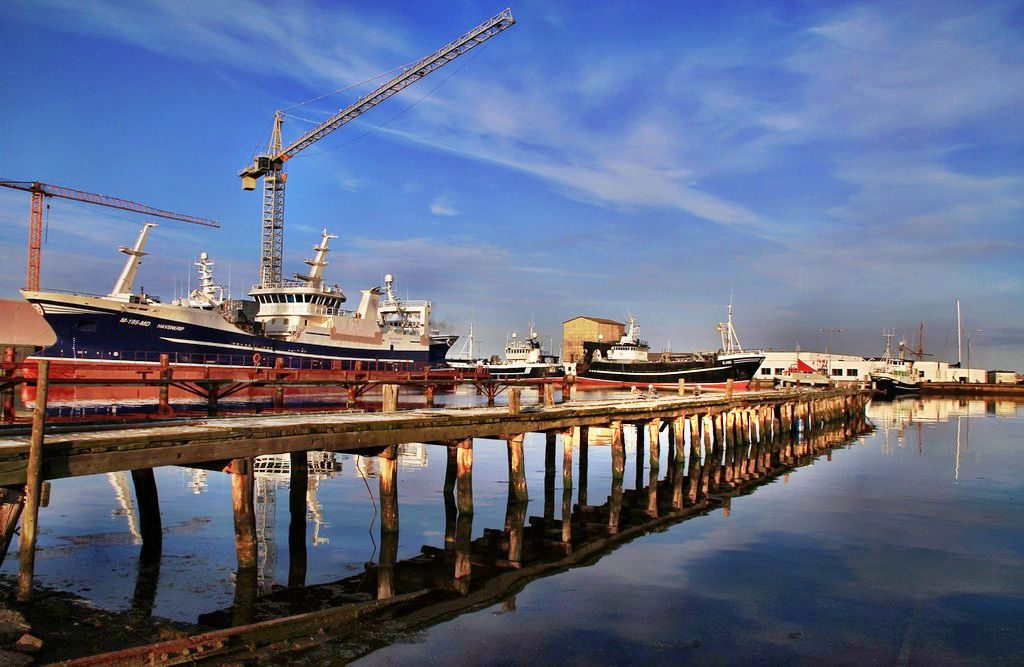
Wharf of the Port of Skagen

For generations, Skagen's economy has been based on its fishing industry that continues to prosper today, facilitated by its fishing harbour, the largest in Denmark. Skagen also has the country's main herring processing facility and the world's largest fish oil factory. The town's evolving fishing industry led to considerable growth in the local population that reached 11,500 in the 1960s. A fish auction is held at dawn in the harbour, and between May and October the harbour also attracts yachting enthusiasts.

Tourism has now become the town's main industry. Initially attracted by its associations with the Skagen Painters, well-to-do visitors sought to benefit from its special light, colour and its fishermen. Their interest led to new hotels, summer houses and expensive villas. The old fishing village was transformed into a miniature city with fine streets lined with boutiques. From the 1960s, it became increasingly fashionable for the upper-classes to spend their summers in Skagen.

Galleries selling local art and reproductions of Skagen's most iconic paintings have spread across the town, making it one of the places in Denmark with most galleries. Thanks to the town's growing reputation, sailing enthusiasts from Norway, Sweden and Denmark are now also among its frequent visitors. The quality brand name of Skagen has spread far afield, resulting in the establishment of the successful American watch company Skagen Designs that "set out to create a design driven company centred around the welcoming spirit of the city". Currently a new tourist initiative "The Top of Denmark" targets Skagen as a year-round attraction, not just a summer resort. The harbour is also being adapted to accommodate large international cruise ships. A new 450-meter berth will be completed by 2015 while the existing 170-meter berth will be extended to 200 meters. Skagen now attracts some 2 million visitors a year to its hotels, restaurants, shops and galleries, making tourism a major source of income and employment. An annual attraction is the Skagen Festival, Denmark's oldest music festival, which is held the first weekend of July at various venues in Skagen and the harbour area. The largest campsite in the Skagen area is Grenen Camping, situated about 1.5 kilometres (0.93 mi) northeast of the centre, adjacent to the beach.

Until 2007, Skagen was a municipality in its own right with a substantial local administration. With the reforms of 2007, it became part of Frederikshavn Municipality with a resulting loss in administrative jobs. The Bank of Skagen was established in 1862, and in 1865 a telegraph station was established in the town. The pharmacy opened in 1904, a hospital in 1916, and telephone services were automated in 1956. Ankermedet School was established in 1955. Recently, Skagen has seen developments in the offshore sector with an initiative to assist the Norwegian market through the establishment of Skagen Offshorepark in 2012. On the shipbuilding front, Karstensens Skibsværft continues to prosper with orders for trawlers from Norway.

Currently the harbour is being enlarged in order to accommodate larger vessels, especially cruise ships. From 2015 the enlarged harbour is expected to attract up to 40 large cruise ships per year compared to about a dozen smaller ships at present. The new harbour should provide new jobs increasing the workforce in the harbour from 2,000 today to some 2,600 on completion. Karstens Skibsværft, Danish Yacht, and the herring processing firm, Skagerrak Pelgic, are reported to be the most successful companies in Skagen but the town is also home to FF Skagen, the world's top producer of fish meal and fish oil.

=== Commerce ===
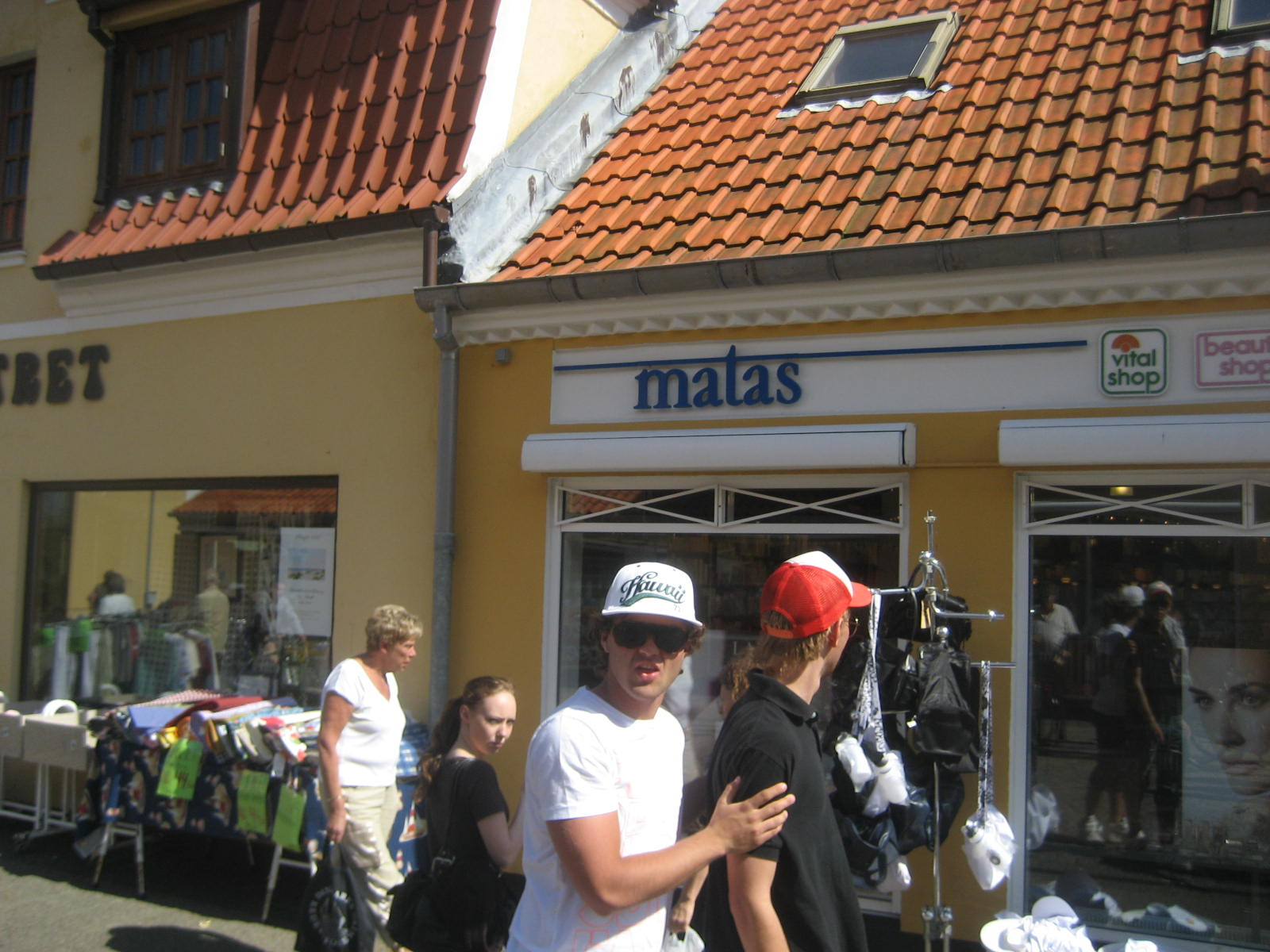
Shops in Skagen

Thanks to Skagen's reputation as an artistic community, the local arts and crafts trade is also an important source of income and employment. Artwork and handicrafts are sold in galleries on Trondsvej. Sankt Laurentii Vej, one of the main streets away from the harbour area in Skagen, known for its glass and pottery shops; of particular note are Skagen Glasvaerksted, which produces some of "Jutland's finest glass pieces", and Skagen Potteri. In addition to its arts and crafts stores, the town has a wide range of shops, including jewellery, clothes and shoes, handbags, souvenirs, flowers and gardening equipment. There are also a variety of food stores with butchers, bakers, a cheese shop, fishmongers, and several restaurants and cafés.

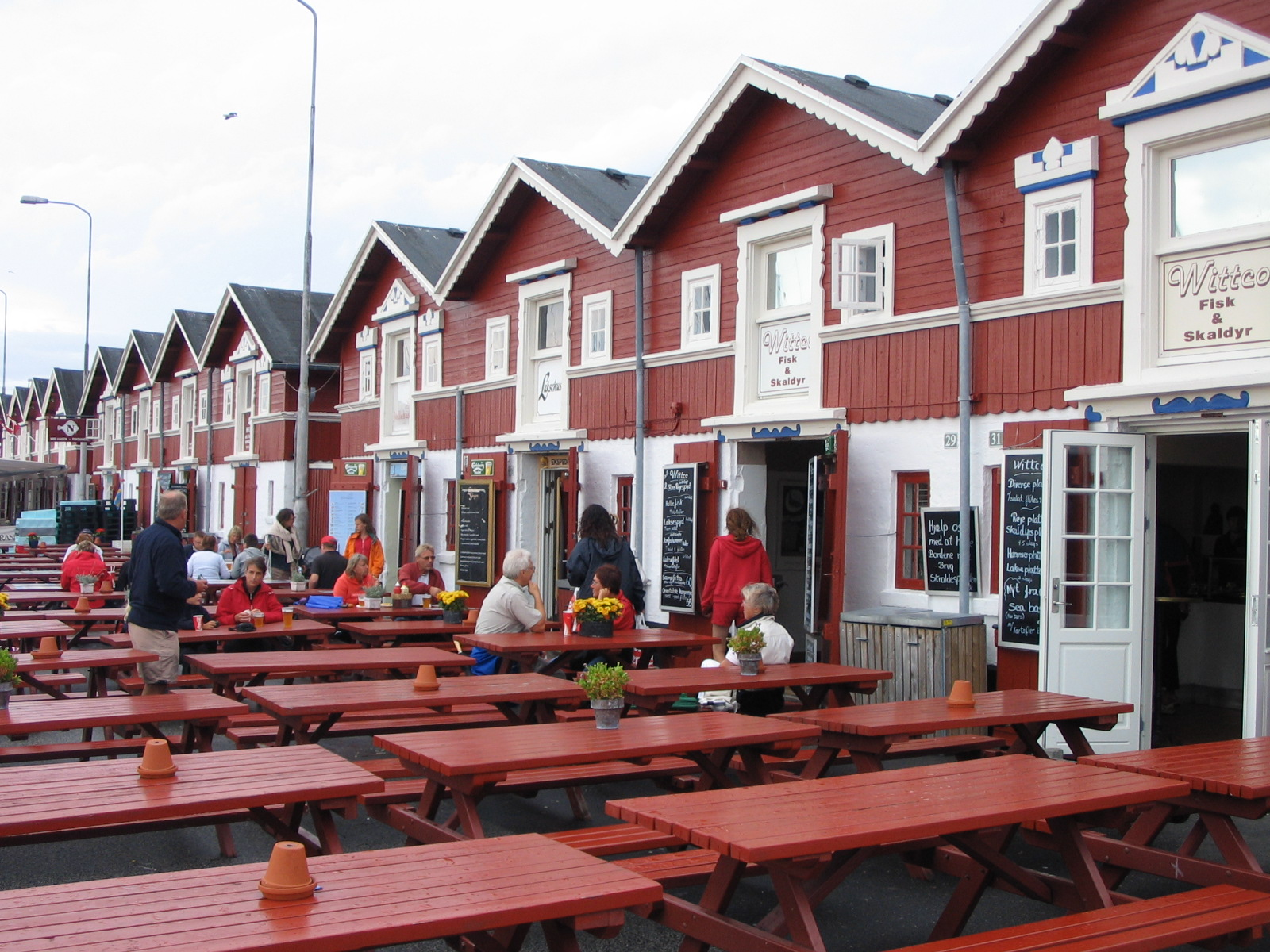
Restaurant Pakhuse in Skagen

Given the abundance of fresh fish coming it at the port of Skagen, seafood forms a staple of cuisine in Skagen. Of particular note is the Skagen Fiske Restaurant that was established in 1907 at the side of the harbour. Ruth's Gourmet in Ruth's Hotel on Hans Ruth Vej is also of note and has been cited to be one of the top five restaurants in Denmark outside of Copenhagen, serving French cuisine under head chef Michel Michaud. Ruths Hotel was originally built by Emma and Hans Christian Ruth in 1904 as a bath and guest house.

== Landmarks ==
=== Northern headland and lighthouses ===
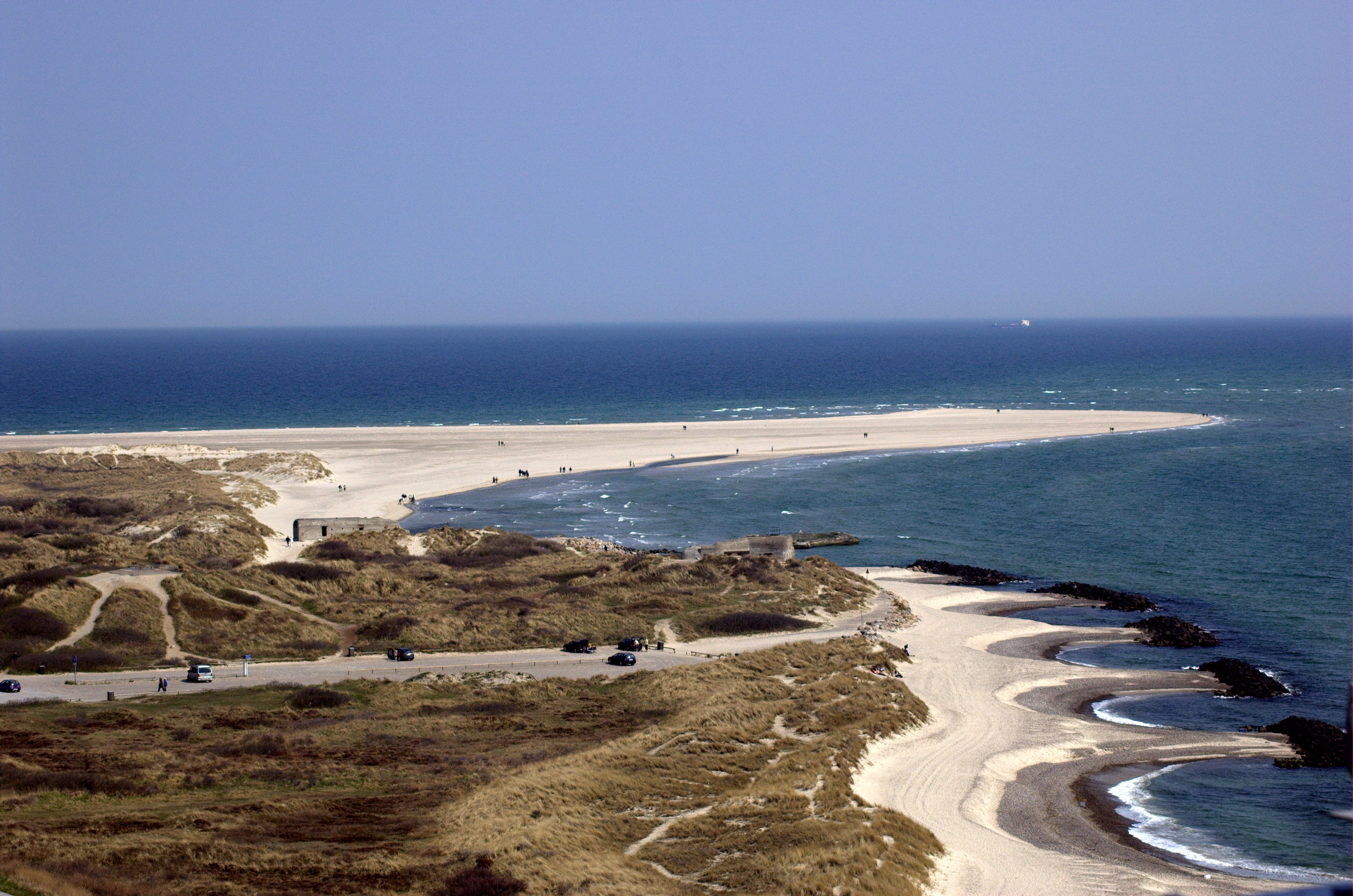
The northernmost point of Denmark is called Grenen (The Branch)

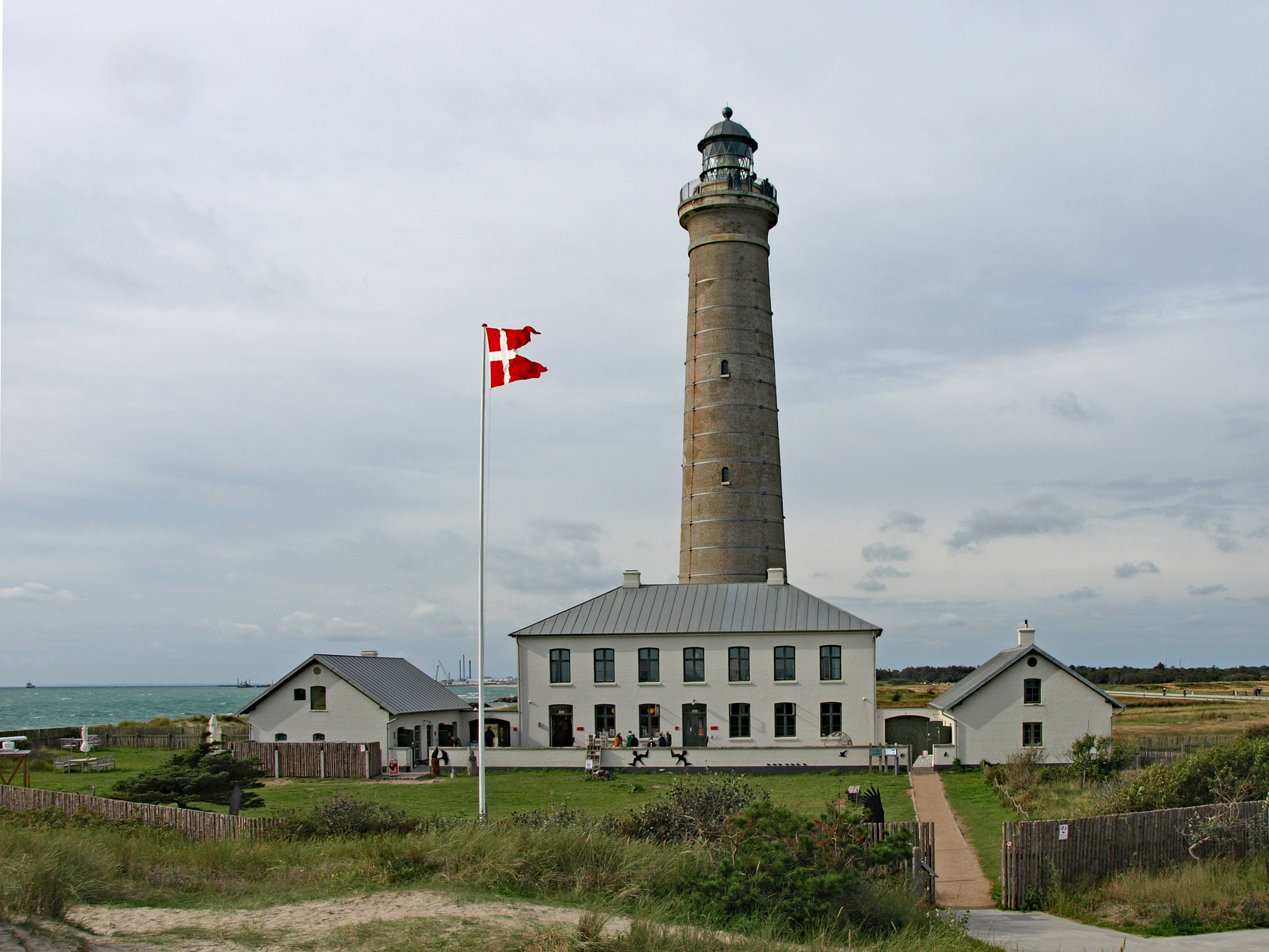
Skagen Lighthouse in 2019

At the headland at Grenen, the northernmost point of Denmark (excluding Greenland and the Faroe Islands), the North Sea and the Baltic Sea meet. Because of their different densities, a clear dividing line can be seen. As a result of turbulent seas, beachings and shipwrecks were common. These frequent losses combined with the town's strategic location as the gateway to the Baltic led to Skagen being the site of one of Denmark's earliest lighthouses, Vippefyr, a lever light constructed in 1627. A faithful copy has now been constructed on the site of the original.

The White Lighthouse (det Hvide fyr) just north of the town is Denmark's oldest brick-built lighthouse. With a height of 21 m (69 ft), it was designed by Philip de Lange and lit for the first time in 1747. In 1858, it was replaced by the Grey Lighthouse (det Grå fyr) 2 km further north. Restored in 1960, the White Lighthouse now houses art exhibitions.

=== Churches ===
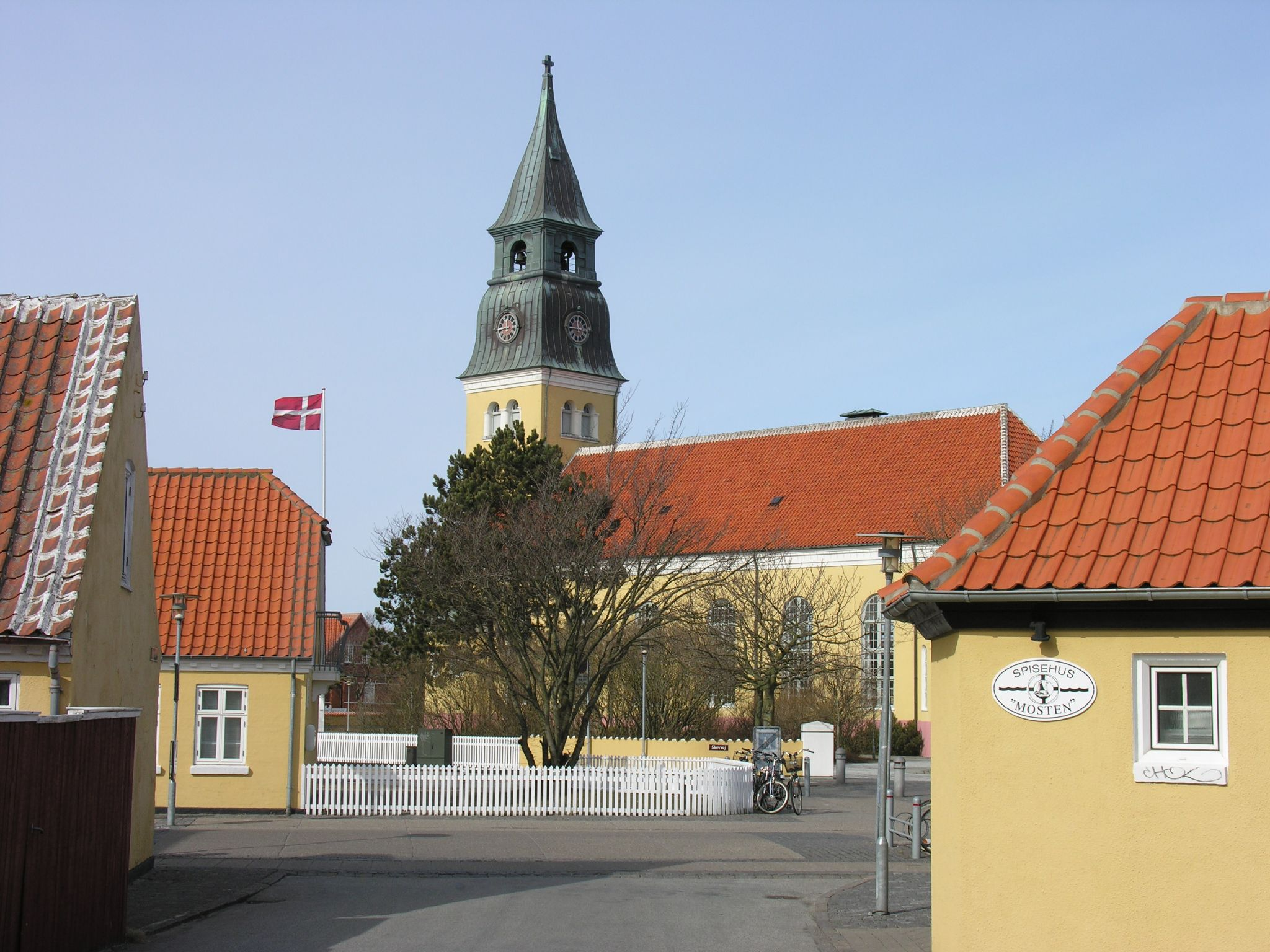
The modern Skagen Church

The old village church from the 14th century is now known as The Sand-Covered Church as only its tower can still be seen. Sand began drifting in from Råbjerg Mile around 1600 and the area surrounding the church became affected by the desertification that destroyed the fields. In 1775, the church door had to be dug free for the congregation to be able to attend the service, and for the following 20 years, the Skageners struggled to keep the church free from sand, without being allowed to close it down. In 1795 the church was closed by royal decree and the body of the church demolished. A new church was built in 1841 to the design of Christian Frederik Hansen. The design was adapted in 1909–10 by Ulrik Plesner who also designed a number of other buildings in Skagen. Plesner collaborated with Thorvald Bindesbøll on the interior. Anne L. Hansen created interior decorations and a new colour scheme in 1989. A highlight of the year is the celebration of Midsummer Eve or St. John's Evening (Sankt Hans Aften) on the beach with blazing bonfire and song.

=== Museums ===
==== Skagens Museum ====
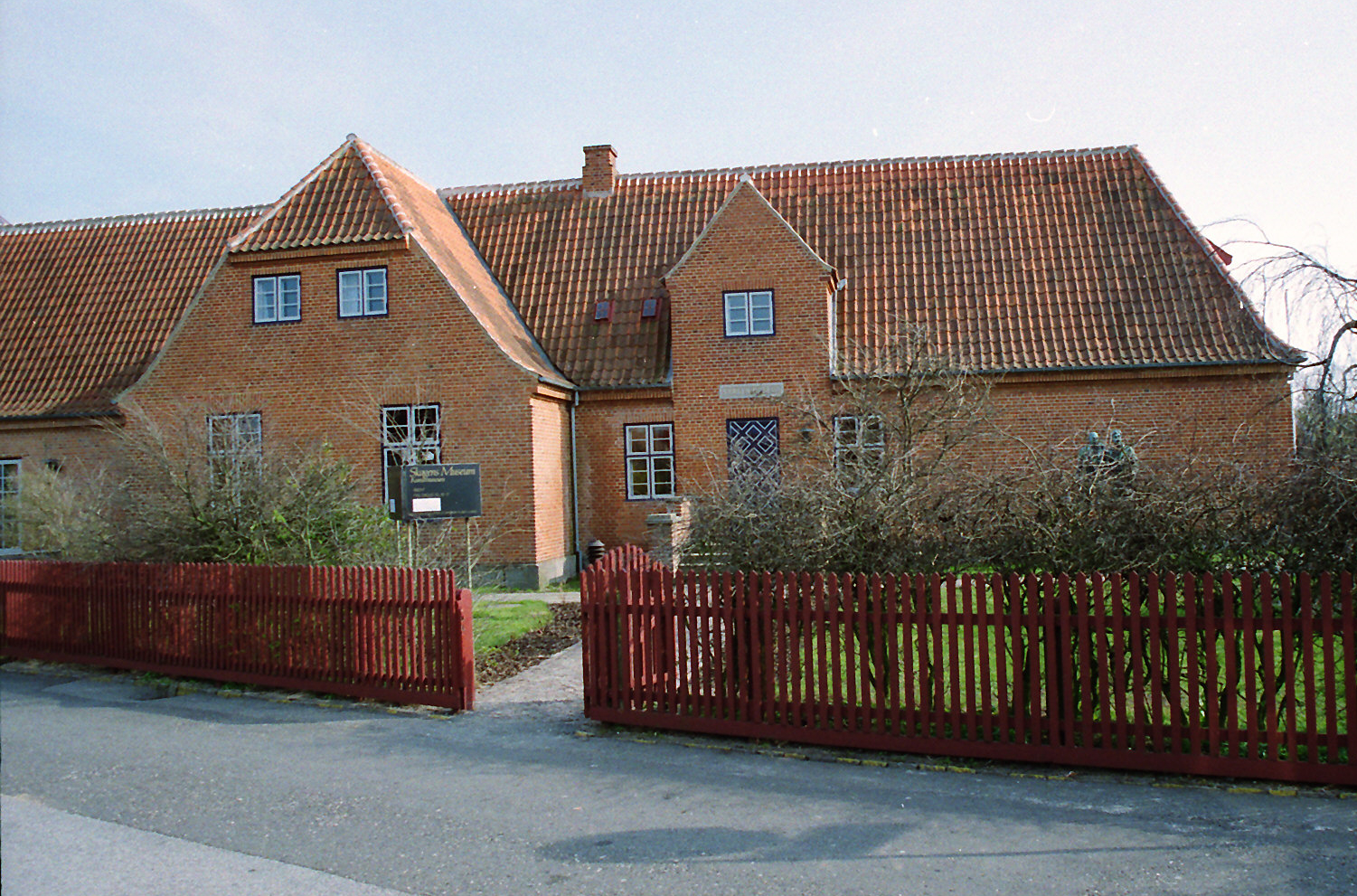
Skagens Museum

Towards the end of the 19th century, Skagen became the summer venue of a group of artists who were attracted by the way of life in the fishing village and by the opportunities for painting the fishermen and surrounding landscapes. Skagens Museum was founded on 20 October 1908 in the dining room at Brøndums Hotel. Among the founders were artists Michael Ancher, P.S. Krøyer and Laurits Tuxen, who were elected to form the first board of governors together with Victor Christian Klæbel, the local pharmacist, and Degn Brøndum, who was the proprietor of Brøndums Hotel and brother of Anna Ancher. In 1982, the exhibition rooms were extended with an annex designed by the Royal Surveyor, architect Jacob Blegvad. Blegvad also planned the later extension to the museum that was inaugurated in 1989. Today Skagens Museum has more than 1,900 works of art at its disposal.

==== Anchers Hus ====
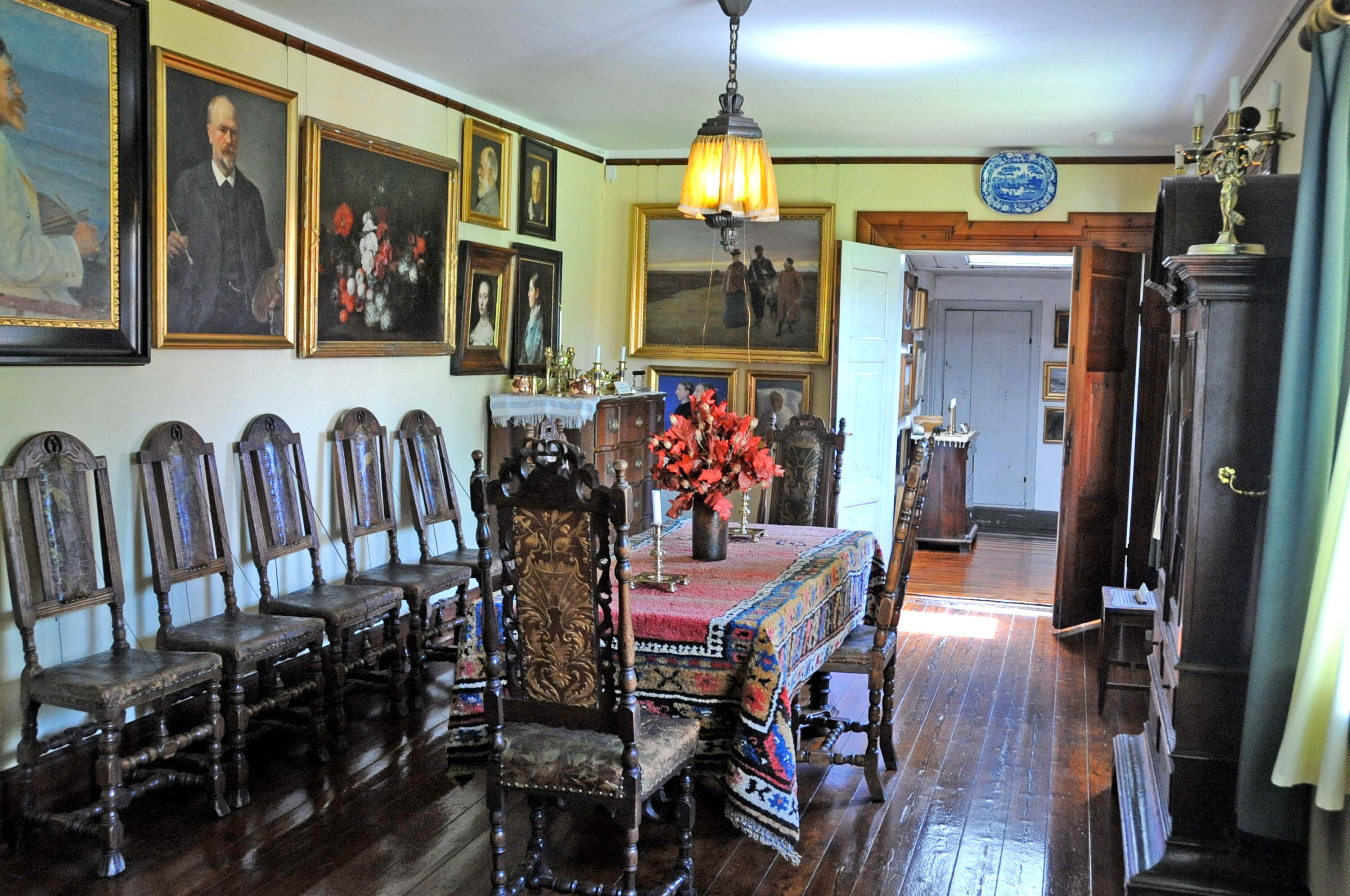
Inside the Anchers' home

The former residence of the two painters Anna and Michael Ancher dates from 1884 and was expanded with a studio designed by Ulrik Plesner in 1913. Their only child, Helga Ancher, who died in 1964, left the property to a foundation for conversion into a museum. Opened to the public in 1967, the house contains much of the original furniture, preserving the atmosphere of the artists' home. Together with the adjacent 18th-century Saxild House (Saxilds Gaard), it displays many of the Anchers' paintings as well as those of their artist friends. Saxild House hosts exhibitions and a museum café

==== Drachmanns Hus ====
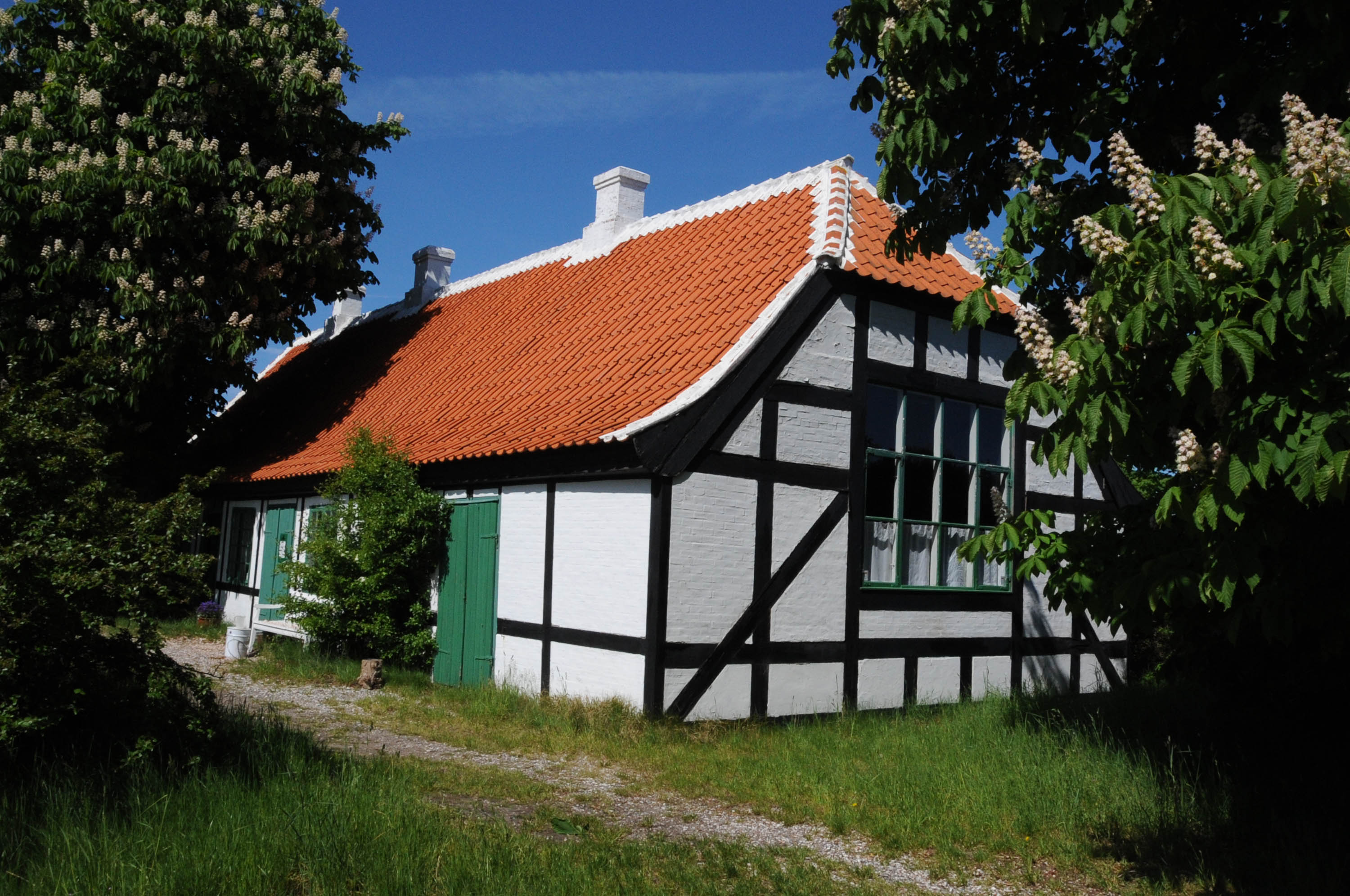
Drachmann's House

Drachmanns Hus on Hans Baghs Vej in the west of the town is a large property built in 1829. Now a museum, it is dedicated to the writer and marine painter Holger Drachmann who lived in the house from 1902 until his death in a sanatorium in Hornbæk in January 1908. Drachmann had regularly visited Skagen from 1871. Drachmann's House, first opened to the public on 4 June 1911, offers a collection not only of his own oil paintings and sketchbooks, but also of paintings from the colony's other artists including Krøyer, Tuxen and the Anchers. An annex contains a photographic exhibition about Drachmann. Every year, the house hosts a "Drachmann evening" in which enthusiasts gather together to hear readings, oral presentations and music related to the writer's life and works.

==== Teddy Bear Museum ====
In central Skagen there is a teddy bear museum, Skagen Bamsemuseum. The teddy bears on display belong to the private collection of the owner Jonna Thygesen. It is the only teddy bear museum in Scandinavia. Opened in 1998, the collection contains about a thousand bears of all kinds, some of historic value. The museum also has a sculpture garden, an ice café and a teddy bear shop. Special events are arranged at Easter and Christmas.

==== Skagen Odde Nature Centre ====
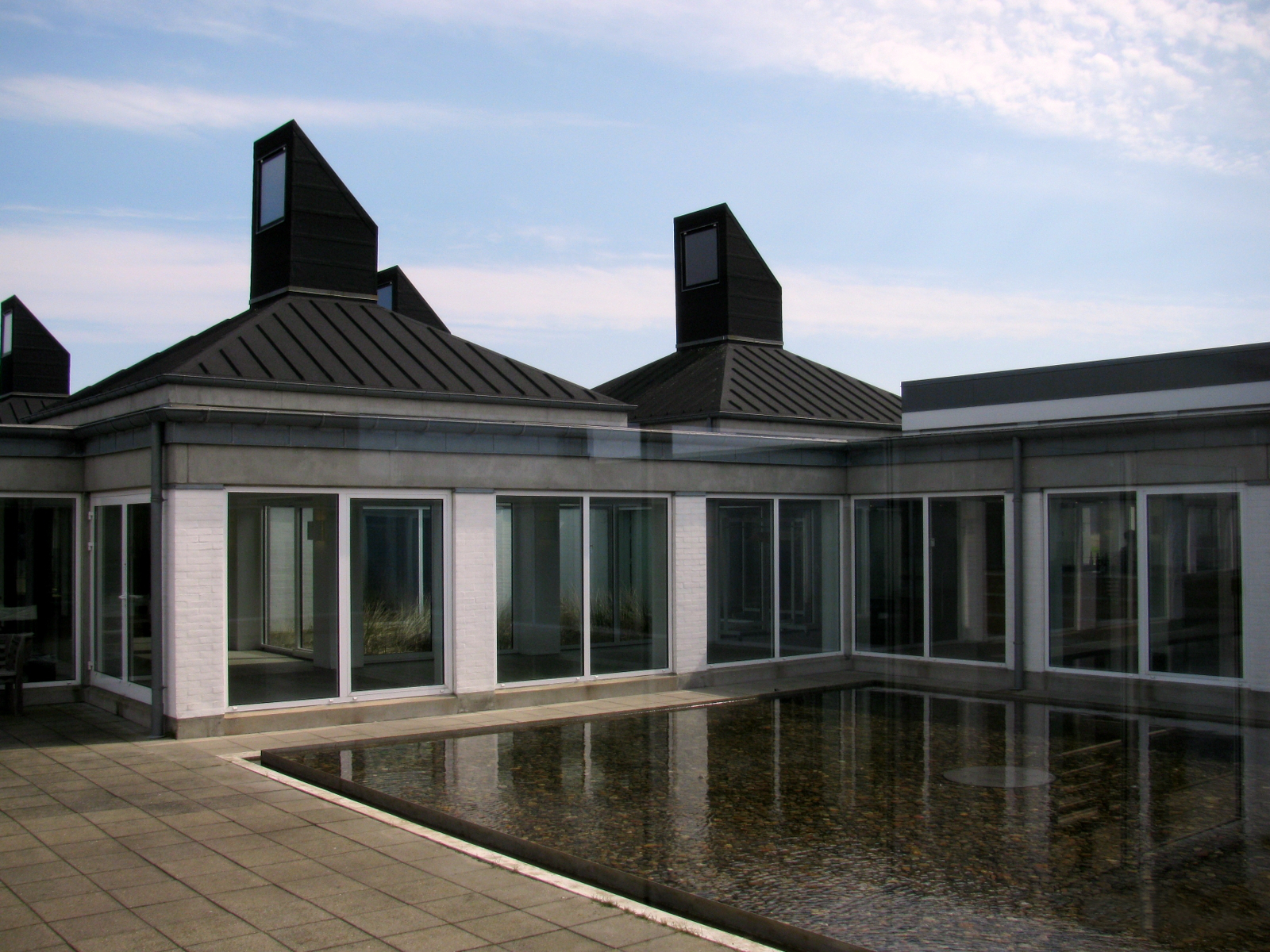
Utzon's Skagen Odde Nature Centre

The Skagen Odde Nature Centre located close to the northern tip of the peninsula is a museum specially built to allow visitors to see, hear and understand more about the area's sand, water, wind and light. Each of the pavilions presents one of these elements in a special atmosphere. Designed by Jørn Utzon, it is the most northerly building on Skagen Odde.

==== Skagen Town and Regional Museum ====
Skagen Town and Regional Museum (Skagen By- og Egnsmuseum), an open-air museum, was opened by the local population in 1927. In 1938 it was moved to the sand dunes of Vesterby. The museum brings together examples of fishermen's cottages and the homes of less fortunate inhabitants of Skagen in the middle of the 19th century. There is an old life-saving station, a smithy, an old Dutch windmill, pictures of ships in distress and related nautical artefacts as well as a collection of items illustrating the town's history over various periods.

== Education ==
Skagen's first school was the Latinskole, a grammar school, which was in operation from 1549 until 1739. By the end of the 19th century, three schools had been established in Skagen: one in Vesterby, another in Østerby and a third in Højen. As a result of evolving legislation, a new public primary school (Borgerskolen) designed by A. Haunstrup was completed in 1901. A gymnasium was added in 1909 but in 1924 it was converted into classrooms to accommodate the growing number of pupils. A secondary school (Realskolen) was opened in 1904 behind the former local authority building on Sct. Laurentii vej. The secondary school was later moved next to the primary school and in 1948 the buildings were extended. An additional two-storey wing was completed in 1969.

In 1921, Skagen's Skipper School was opened to train navigators for both fishing boats and merchant ships. It is now the only remaining skipper school in Denmark with some 100 students from the whole of Scandinavia and 15 staff. In 2012, the school moved into new premises close to the Kattegat. In 1955, the folkschool Ankermedets skole was opened on Skagavej, initially with 483 pupils and 16 classes. It has been extended several times over the years, most recently when a new wing was added in 2003. The private school Brovandeskolen, a so-called free school, opened in 1977 for parents wishing to offer their children a new pedagogical approach. A primary goal is active cooperation between pupils, teachers and parents.

== Sport ==
Skagen's sports centre dates from 1974 when its large hall was completed. A smaller hall with bedrooms was built in 1999. The centre has facilities for badminton, basketball, handball, hockey and tennis in addition to its football fields. Overnight accommodation is also available. Skagen Idræts Klub, the local football club founded in 1946, plays in Jyllandsserien, one of the lower divisions in Denmark's football system. Skagen also has a badminton club and a tennis club, The Hvide Klit Golf Club is located some 17 km (11 mi) south of the town on the road to Ålbæk. In season, it is popular with tourists.

== Transport ==
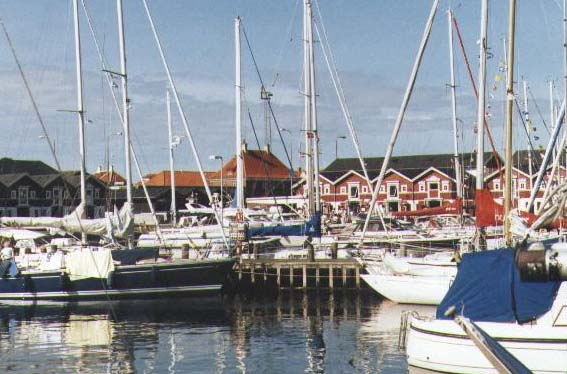
Skagen harbour

Skagen lies along Danish national road 40, also known as Frederikshavnsvej, which connects the town to Frederikshavn, via Ålbæk to the southeast. The stretch of the road between Skagen and Ålbæk was asphalted in 1932. Hirtshals on the western side of the peninsula can be reached by taking Road 597 from Ålbæk. The Bøjlevejen road is the main skirt road around the town to the north, along which lies the Skagen Odde Nature Centre. In the peak season during the summer months, Skagen can become congested with traffic. Free parking facilities are provided for short periods, and there is also a metered car park near the train station. As in other Danish cities, cycling is popular, and Skagen Cykeludlejning, to the west of the train station, and Pedersen on Kappelborgvej rent out bikes to tourists. There are a number of interesting marked cycle routes in and around Skagen. These include circuits for mountain bikes.

The Skagen Line connects Skagen with Frederikshavn station in Frederikshavn to the south. Nordjyske Jernbaner operates a frequent train service between Skagen and Frederikshavn with onward connections by train to the rest of Denmark. Skagen station, the most northerly railway station in mainland Denmark, is the principal station of the town. Skagen's first station, opened in 1890, was designed by Thomas Arboe. The current building, completed in 1919, is the work of the architect Ulrik Plesner. The western part of Skagen is also served by the Frederikshavnsvej railway halt.

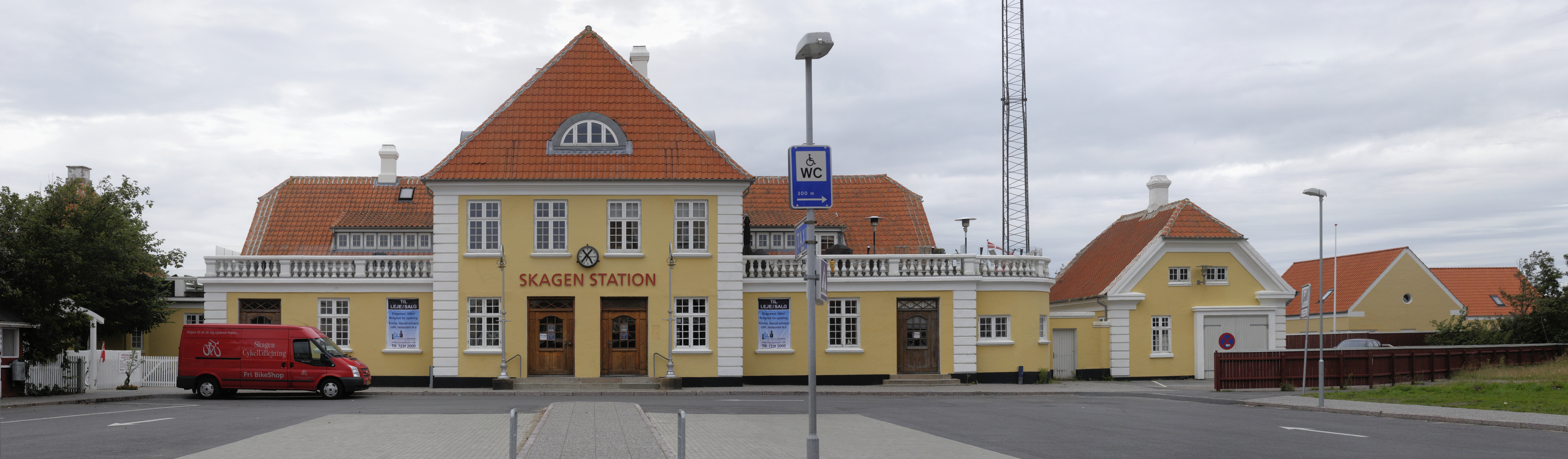
Skagen Station

Aalborg Airport with flights to and from destinations across Europe is located some 100 km (62 mi) southwest of Skagen. It can be reached by train, bus or taxi.

== Notable people ==
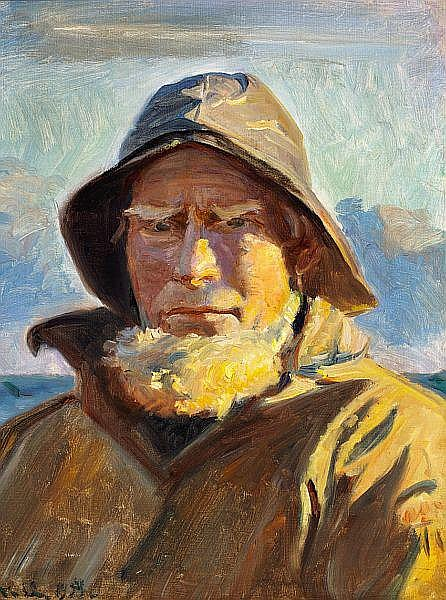
Lars Kruse, by Michael Ancher, 1908

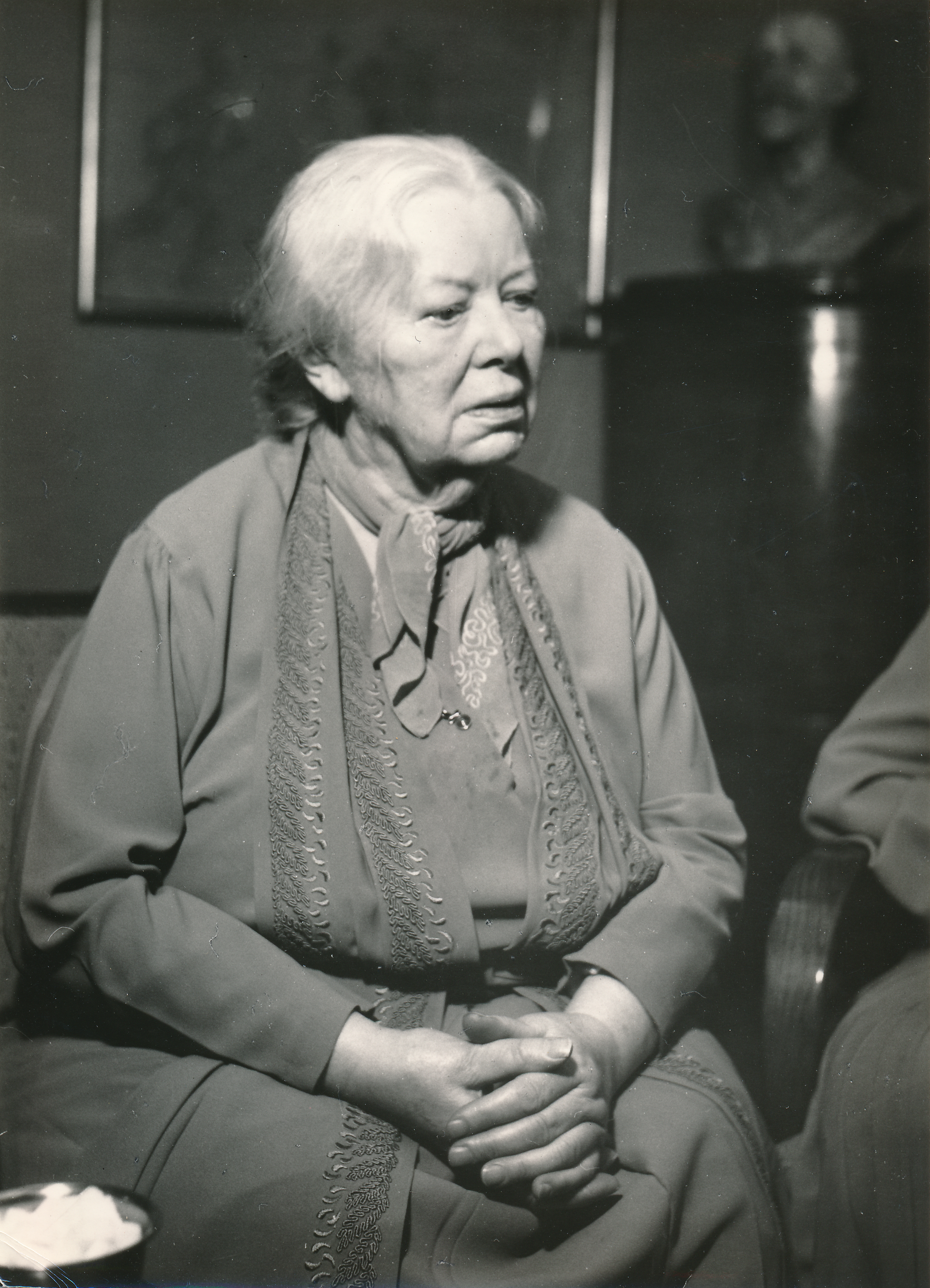
Helga Ancher, 1960's

Among those born in Skagen are:

- Jacob Brønnum Scavenius (1749–1820), landowner
- Lars Kruse (1828–1894), fisherman and heroic lifesaver
- Degn Brøndum (1856–1932), proprietor of Brøndums Hotel frequented by the Skagen painters
- Anna Ancher (1859–1935), the only member of the Skagen painters actually born in Skagen
- Amalie Claussen (1859–1950), artistic photographer
- Ulrik Plesner (1861–1933), the architect who gave Skagen its distinctive look
- Palle Bruun (1873–1910), the hydraulic engineer who designed Skagen's fishing harbour
- Helga Ancher (1883–1964), painter, daughter of Anna Ancher and Michael Ancher
- Sturla Gudlaugsson (1913–1971), Danish-born Dutch art historian and director of the RKD and the Mauritshuis in The Hague
- Ida Marie Suhr (1853–1938), wealthy philanthropist and estate owner, frequent visitor to Skagen
- Hanne Marie Svendsen (born 1933), writer and former broadcasting executive
- Friis Arne Petersen (born 1952), Danish diplomat, Denmark's ambassador to Germany
- Saliha Marie Fetteh (born 1962), writer, lecturer and imam
- Line Dissing Karred Larsen (born 1996), known mononymously as Line, singer

=== Sport ===
- Viggo Jensen (1921–2005), footballer, played professionally for Hull City A.F.C. 1949–1956
- David Nielsen (born 1976), footballer with 361 club caps, current manager of Lyngby Boldklub
- Kamilla Rytter Juhl (born 1983), badminton player, silver medallist at 2016 Summer Olympics
- Mariann Gajhede Knudsen (born 1984), retired footballer, over 100 caps for the Denmark women's national football team
- Nicolaj Thomsen (born 1993), Danish footballer, plays for F.C. Copenhagen

All the painters, writers and other members of the artists' colony also have close associations with Skagen.

== Twin towns ==
Skagen is twinned with:

- Chenderiang, Malaysia
- Farsund, Norway
- Kristinehamn, Sweden
- Qingdao, China
- Seinäjoki, Finland
- Sisimiut, Greenland

== Bibliography ==
- Ancher, Michael; Ancher, Anne; Sandby, Vibeke; Agerholm, Pernille; Agerholm, Jens; Suhr, Ida Marie (2000). Skagens trofaste veninde. Agerholm. ISBN 978-87-987939-1-5.
- Andersen, Arnold (1992). Fra Dampelefant til Dollargrin: Trafikhistoriske glimt fra vejtrafik og jernbaner i og omkring Frederikshavn, Sæby og Skagen (in Danish). S.A.L. ISBN 87-89340-05-1. Archived from the original on 14 October 2013.
- Andersen, Poul Carit; Secher, Alex (1980). Skagen i fortid og nutid (in Danish). Carit Andersen. ISBN 978-87-424-4255-5.
- Christensen, Erling S. (1987). Natur og mennesker på Skagens odde (in Danish). Bakkelund. ISBN 978-87-982532-1-1.
- Folsach, Birgitte von; samling, C. L. Davids fond og (1996). By the light of the crescent moon: images of the Near East in Danish art and literature, 1800–1875. David Collection. ISBN 978-87-89384-39-9.
- Jensen, Birthe (2011). Sweet on Denmark. Images Publishing. ISBN 978-1-86470-350-4.
- Klitgaard, Carl (1928). Skagen bys historie indtil ca. 1870 (in Danish). I Kommission hos boghandler E. Nielsen (L. Schjeldes eftf.).
- Lindeborg, Lisbeth; Lindkvist, Lars (2013). The Value of Arts and Culture for Regional Development: A Scandinavian Perspective. Routledge. ISBN 978-1-136-76080-8.
- Lonely Planet (2005). Denmark. Lonely Planet. ISBN 978-1-74059-489-9.
- Lonely Planet (Scandinavian Europe) (2009). Scandinavian Europe. Lonely Planet. ISBN 978-1-74104-928-2.
- Lonely Planet (2009). Europe on a Shoestring. Lonely Planet. ISBN 978-1-74220-334-8.
- Olavius, Claus (1787). Oekonomisk-physisk Beskrivelse over Schagens Kiøbstad og Sogn: Forfattet i Følge Kongelig Ordre (in Danish).
- Olesen, Elizabet (2011). Denmark Travel Adventures. Hunter Publishing, Inc. ISBN 978-1-58843-707-5.
- Osborne, Caroline; Mouritsen, Lone (2010). The Rough Guide to Denmark. Penguin. ISBN 978-1-84836-962-7.
- Porter, Darwin; Prince, Danforth (2009). Frommer's Denmark. John Wiley & Sons. ISBN 978-0-470-50290-7.
- Porter, Darwin; Prince, Danforth; Norum, Roger (2011). Frommer's Scandinavia. John Wiley & Sons. ISBN 978-1-118-09023-7.
- Rough Guides (2003). Scandinavia. Rough Guides. ISBN 978-1-84353-218-7.
- Stensgaard, Pernille (2004). Skagen (in Danish). Gyldendal A/S. ISBN 978-87-02-02089-2.
- Svanholm, Lise (2001). Malerne på Skagen (in Danish). Gyldendal A/S. ISBN 87-00-75184-7.
- Svanholm, Lise (2004). Northern Light: The Skagen Painters. Gyldendal A/S. ISBN 978-87-02-02817-1.
- Svanholm, Lise (2003). Skagenleksikon: malerne, modellerne, værkerne og stederne. Gyldendal A/S. ISBN 978-87-02-01947-6.
- Thagaard, Chr (1967). Blade af Skagens historie (in Danish). Einer Nielsens Boghandel.
- Tønnesen, Jens (1946). Det svundne Skagen fortæller : om Fiskerne og om Fiskeriets og Strandingernes By saa længe den har været til (in Danish).
- Voss, Knud (1989). Skagen i nordisk kunst (in Danish). Skagens museum. ISBN 978-87-7600-039-4.
- Heather, William. A new pilot for the Cattegat, Baltic, and Gulf of Finland : containing sailing directions from the Scaw to St. Petersburg.
