= Kapelvej =

Street in Copenhagen, Denmark

Coordinates: 55.6883°N 12.5527°E

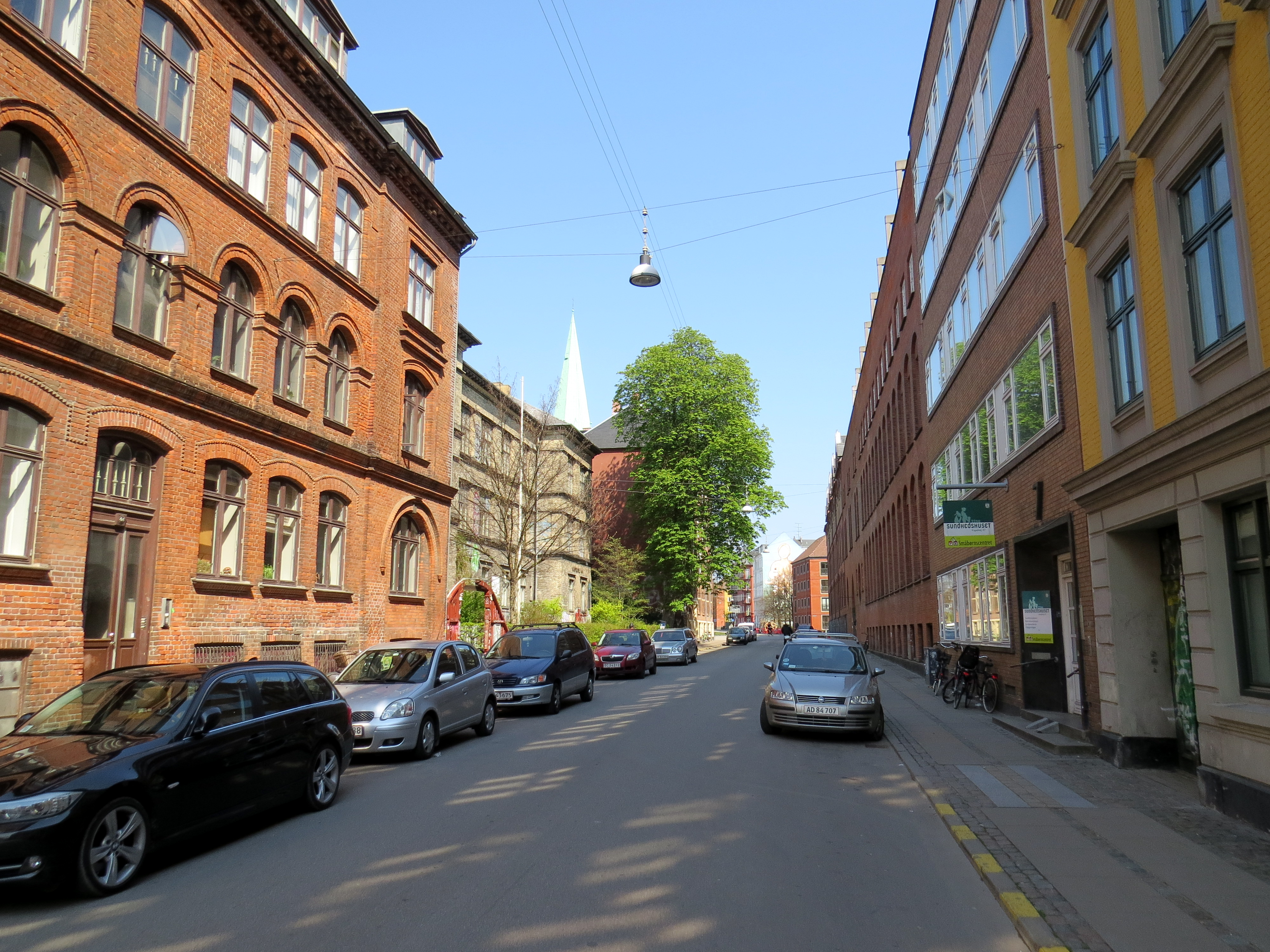
Kapelvej

Kapelvej (lit. 'Chapel Road') is a street in the Nørrebro district of Copenhagen, Denmark. It runs from Nørrebrogade in the northeast to Ågade in the southwest. It first part follows the southeast wall of Assistens Cemetery. The Neo-Gothic Holy Cross Church is located at the corner with Hans Tavsens Gade. The street is blocked for cars at Tjørnegade.

== History ==
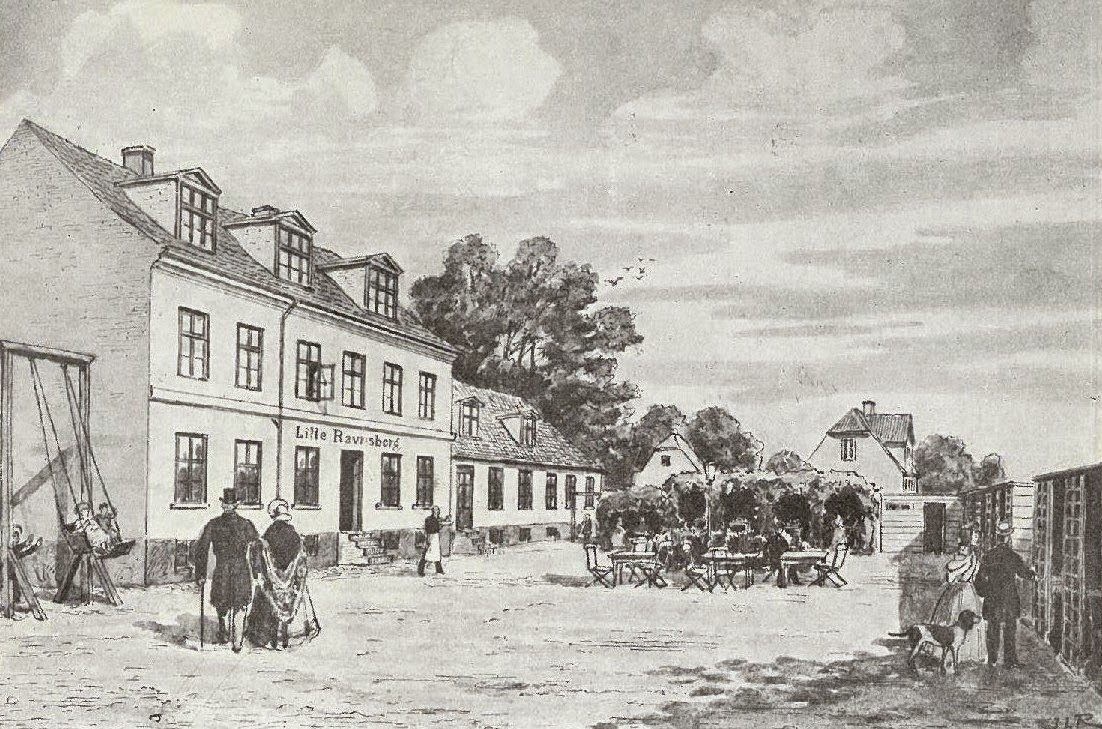
Lille Ravnsborg

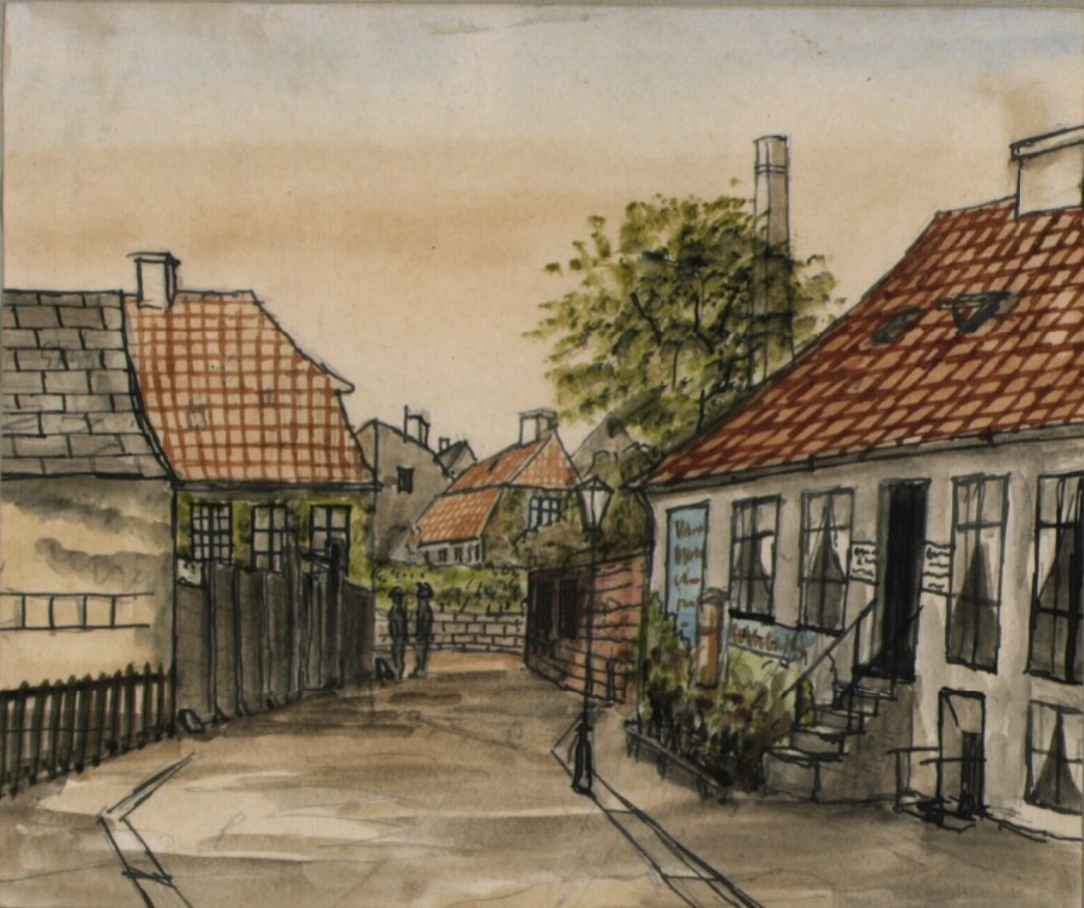
Kapelvej in 1884

Assistens Cemetery was founded on the north side of the road in 1760. The road received its current name in 1869 after the new chapel which was built at No. 2-4. The street was later home to the entertainment venue Lille Ravnsborg. On 16 December 1889, the Copenhagen City Council granted funds for the establishment of the first playground in Copenhagen at Kapelvej.

== Notable buildings and residents ==
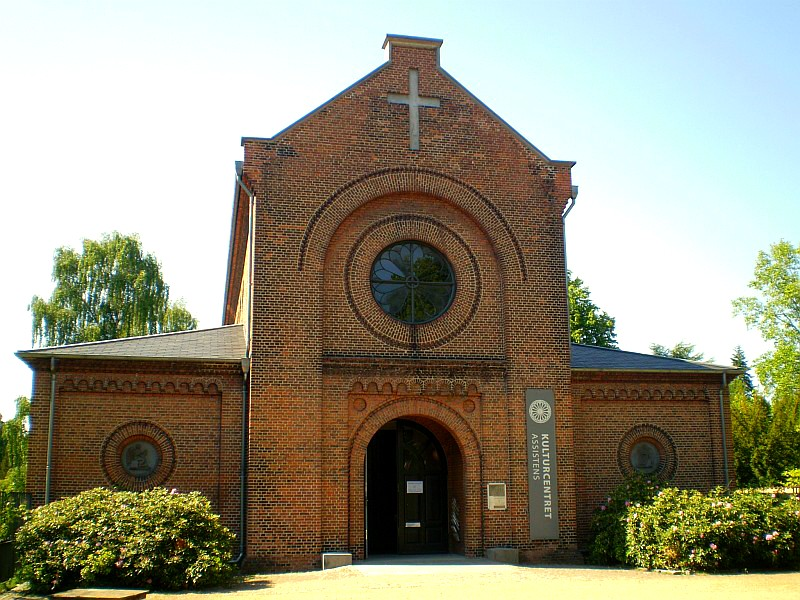
No. 4: Assistens Cultural Centre

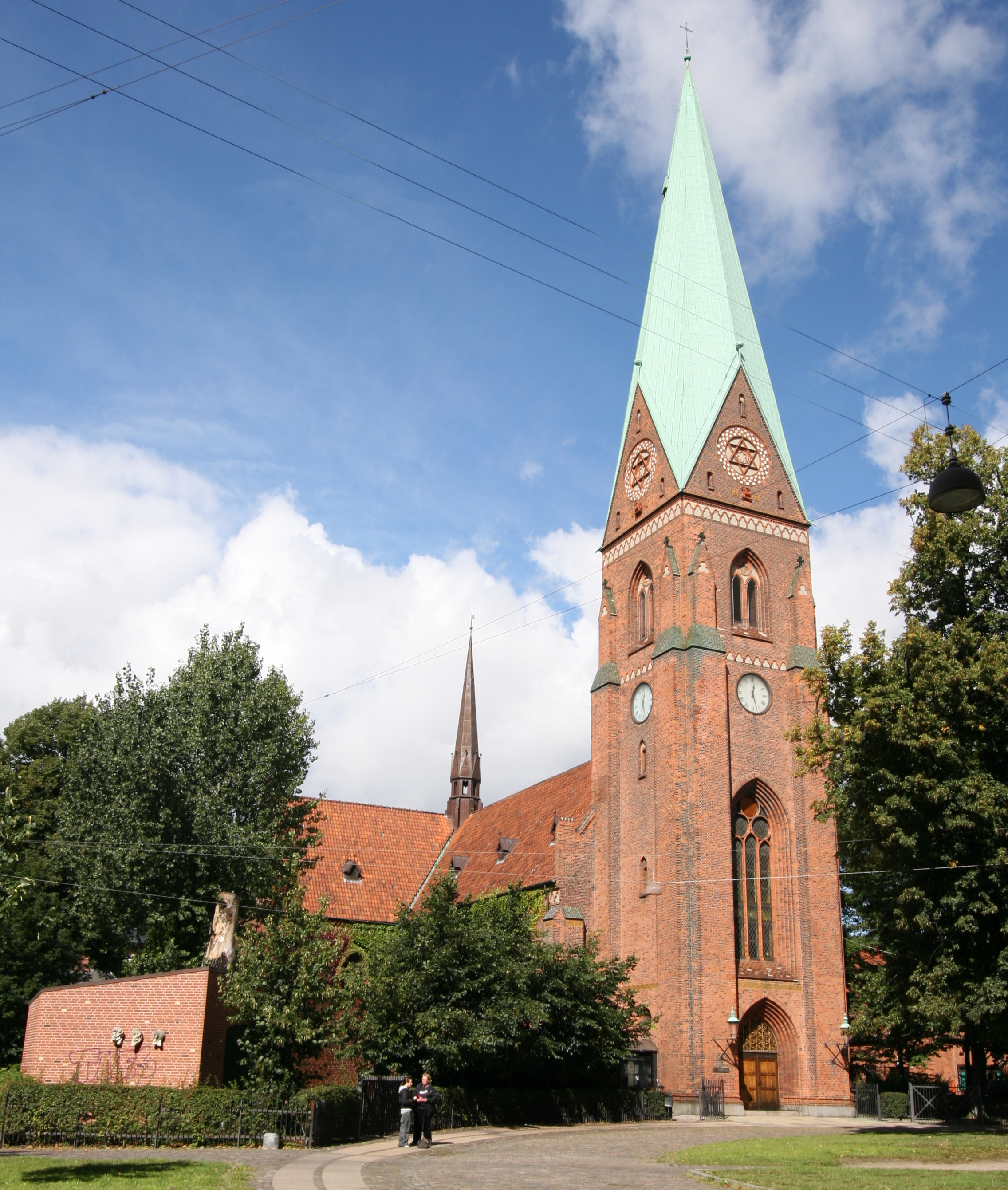
No. 28: Holy Cross Church

The former chapel (No. 4) us now operated as a cultural centre under the name Kulturcentret Assistens. The building was designed by Valdemar Ingemann and built in 1867–1868 under supervision of city builder Niels Sigfred Nebelong.

Holy Cross Church (No. 38) was built to a Neo-Gothic design by Hermann Baagøe Storck in 1887–1890. The former school Kapelvej School (No. 42) was built in 1879. From 1933 until 1960 it also housed the teacher training college Blaagaard Seminarium. On the other side of the street is the former St. Joseph's Hospital. The wings on Kapelvej and Korsgade are from 1900–1901 and were built as an extension to Christian Hansen's original hospital building in Griffenfeldsgade from 1875.

== Transport ==
The Nørrebros Runddel City Circle Line station is located approximately 540 metres from the northern end of the street. Nuuks Plads, also on the City Circle Line, is located approximately 600 metres from the southern part of the street by way of Rantzausgade. Forum Station, served by the M1 and M2 lines, is located approximately 540 metres from the southern end of the street by way of H.C. Ørsteds Vej and Rolighedsvej 9.

== See also ==
- Stefansgade
