= Hans Tavsens Gade =

Street in Copenhagen

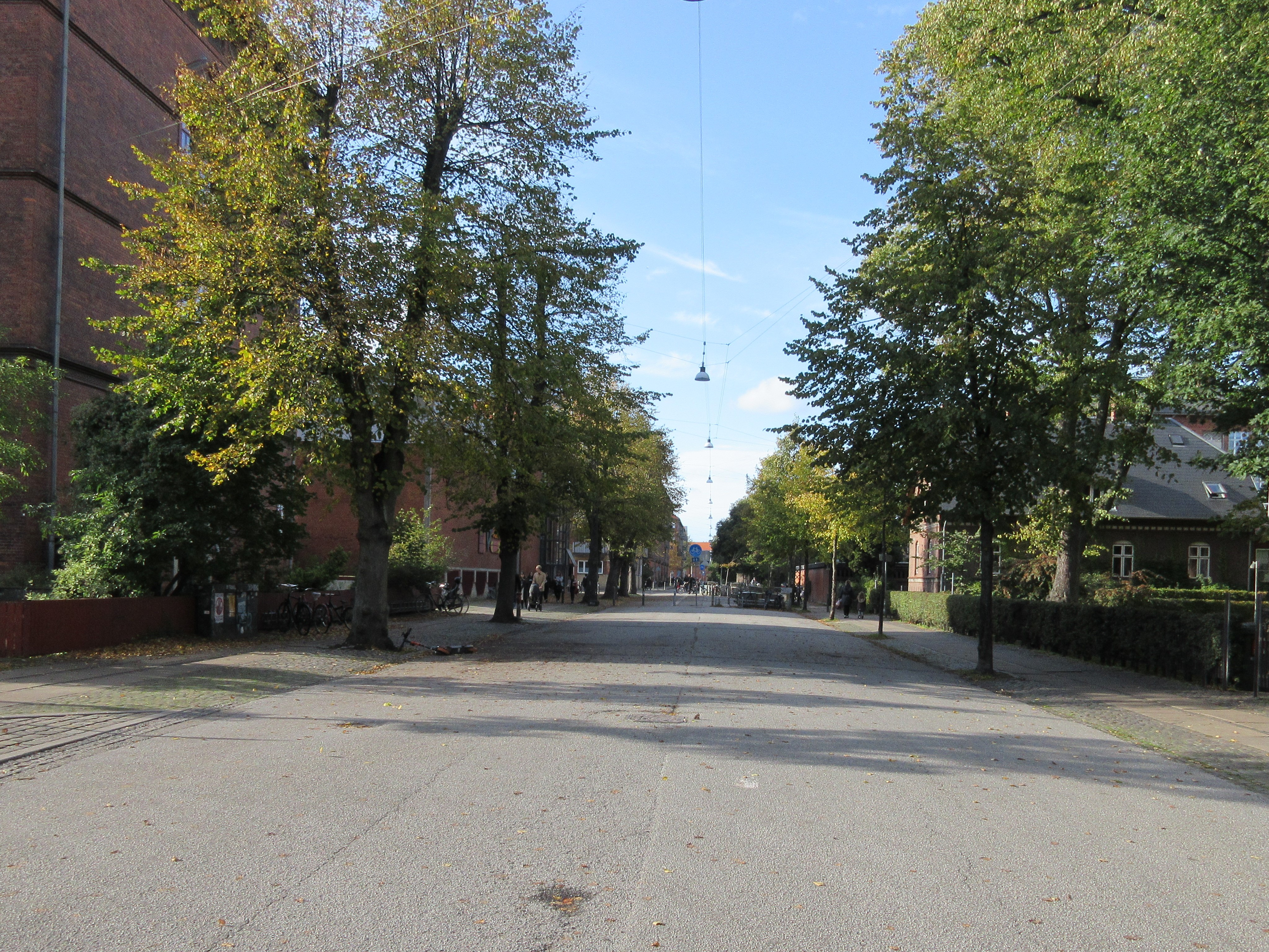
- Interactive map of Hans Tavsens Gade
- Length: 546 m (1,791 ft)
- Location: Nørrebro, Copenhagen, Denmark
- Postal code: 2200
- Nearest metro station: Nuuks Plads

Hans Tavsens Gade is a street which follows the southwest side of Hans Tavsens Park, formerly part of Assistens Cemetery, in the Nørrebro district of Copenhagen, Denmark. The street links Kapelvej in the southeast with Hans Egedes Gade, just south of Jagtvej, in the northwest. The central portion of the street has been closed to car traffic and has a loosely defined boundary with the park.

== History ==
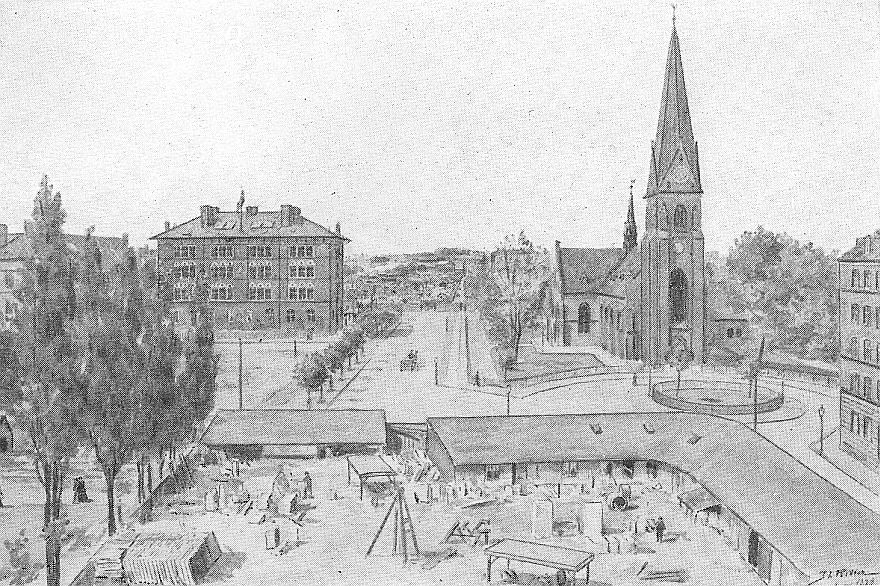
A drawing of the street as seen from Kapelvej in the 1890s. Holy Cross Church is seen to the right and Holy Cross Church's School is seen to the left.

Hans Tavsens Gade and Skolevej (now Struensegade) were established in the 1890s. Hans Tavsens Gade and Skolevej (now Struensegade) were established in the 1890s. Hellig Kors Kirkes Skole was built 1887–1890. The street followed the old "free land" cemetery (frilandskirkegården which, for centuries, had been used for burial of those who could not afford a proper burial inside Assistens Cemetery.

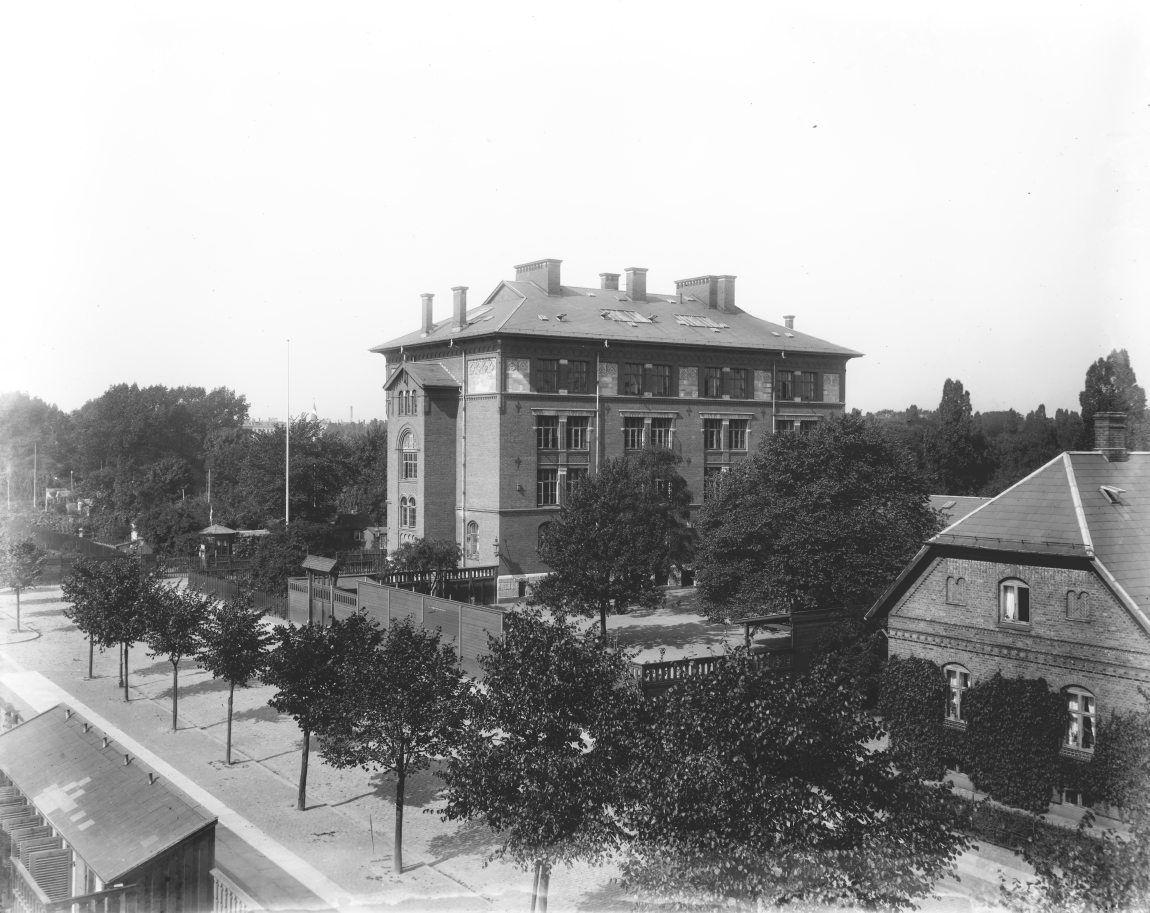
Hans Tavsengades skole photographed by Frederik Riise

Holy Cross Church was at the same time built in a corner of the old cemetery. Hellig Kors Kirkes Skole, a school, was also built in built 1887–1890.

Hans Tavsens Gades Skole, another school, opened in the street in 1903. A portion of Assistens Cemetery located adjacent to the street was in 1909 converted into a public park.

The central portion of the street was later closed to car traffic and integrated with the park.

== Notable buildings and residents ==
Hellig Kors Kirkes Skole and Hans Tavsens Gades Skole were merged under the name Blågårdsskolen in 2008. The two original school buildings, from 1890 and 1903, were both designed by city architect Ludvig Fenger.

The two residential blocks at No. 15-25 and No. 27-37 were built by the city in 1919 - 1920 to relieve the extended housing shortage that Copenhagen was experiencing following the First World War. The blocks were built to a Neoclassical design by Povil Baumann and would later serve as a model for other municipal housing developments.

== Transport ==
The northerhn end of the street is located approximately 200 metres from the Nuuks Plads Station Copenhagen Metro station. The distance to Nørrebro Runddel Station by way of Jagtvej is approximately 830 metres. Both stations are located on the City Circle Line (M3).
