= Hulsig =

Village in Vendsyssel, Denmark

Coordinates: 57°39′38″N 10°27′43″E

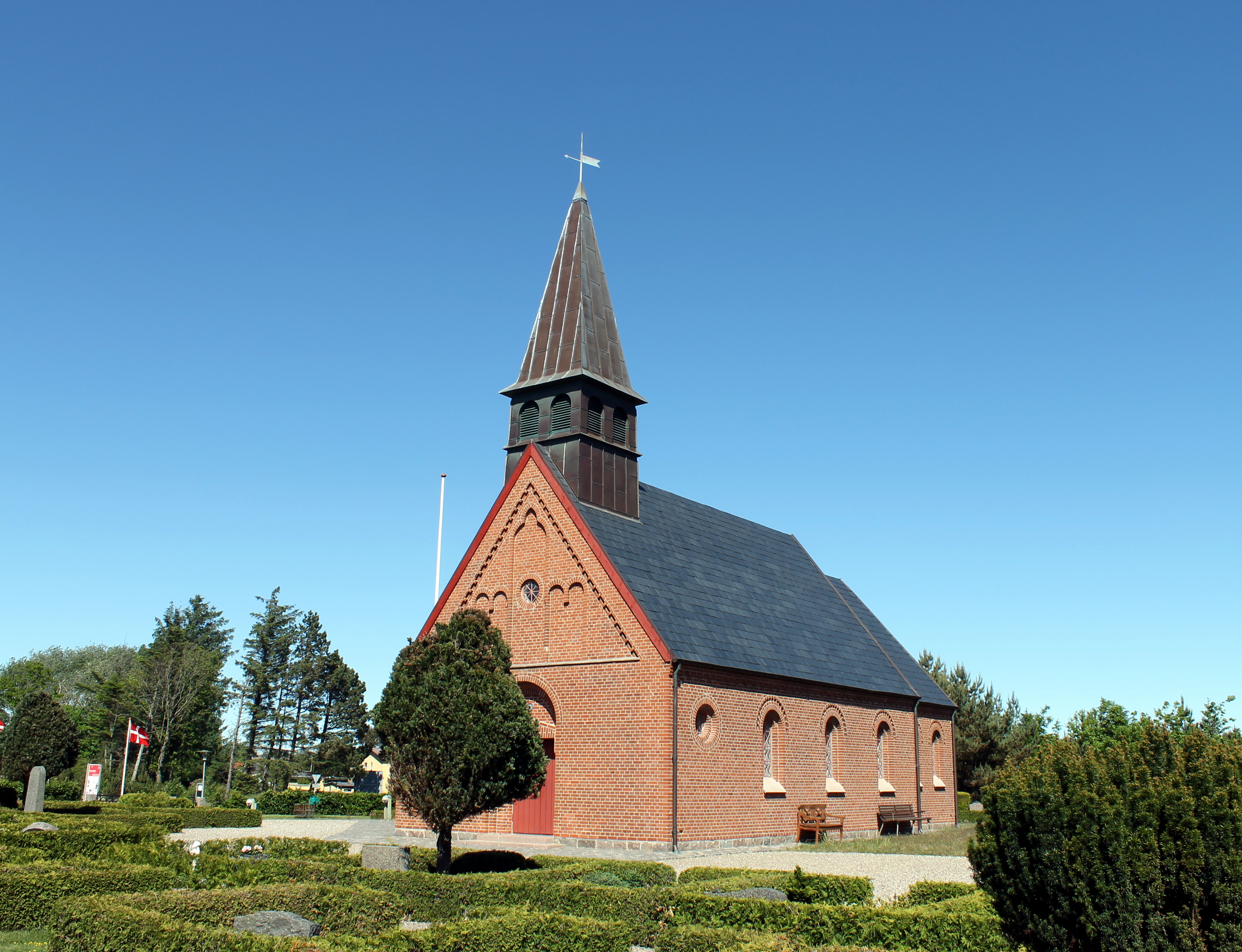
Hulsig Church

Hulsig is a settlement and area of moorland and grey sand dunes in the Råbjerg Mile of the Skagens Odde peninsula, in northern Jutland, northern Denmark. The village lies along the Danish national road 40, to the southwest of the town of Skagen. The rugged heath area is protected under the title Hulsig Heath (Danish: Hulsig Hede) . Hulsig Station (now a halt) and Hulsig Church (completed in 1894) are located in the area. Hulsig is home to one of the country's few remaining flocks of dune sheep.

== Hulsig Heath ==
Hulsig Heath (Danish: Hulsig Hede) is an uninhabited area of sand dunes between Hulsig and Skagen covering an area of 2,170 ha (5,400 acres). Consisting of dune grasses and heather, it stretches from coast to coast across Skagen Odde. Steps have been taken to remove a few mountain pine which have invaded the area. The Skagerrak side to the west consists of stony plains with dunes oriented from east to west, embedded with peat. In the centre, there are a few large migrating dunes interspersed with lush damp hollows.

The dunes began to form in the Bronze Age, developing considerably from the 16th to the 18th century. Their formation has been reduced by planting marram grass, heather and pine trees but this has given them as darker look. As a result, they are called "grey dunes" while those closer to the coast, which still attract drifting sand, are known as "white dunes". The area has been protected since 1940. Among the flora in the area are blue hair grass, polypody, field wormwood, thyme, lady's bedstraw and burnet rose. Bird species include the crane, which has only recently started to breed in the area, bittern, little grebe, red-necked grebe, teal, snipe and curlew.

A paved cycle track, Hulsigstigen, runs from Skagen to Hulsig.
