= Soldenfeldts Stiftelse =

Building in Copenhagen, Denmark

Coordinates: 55°41′48″N 12°34′29″E

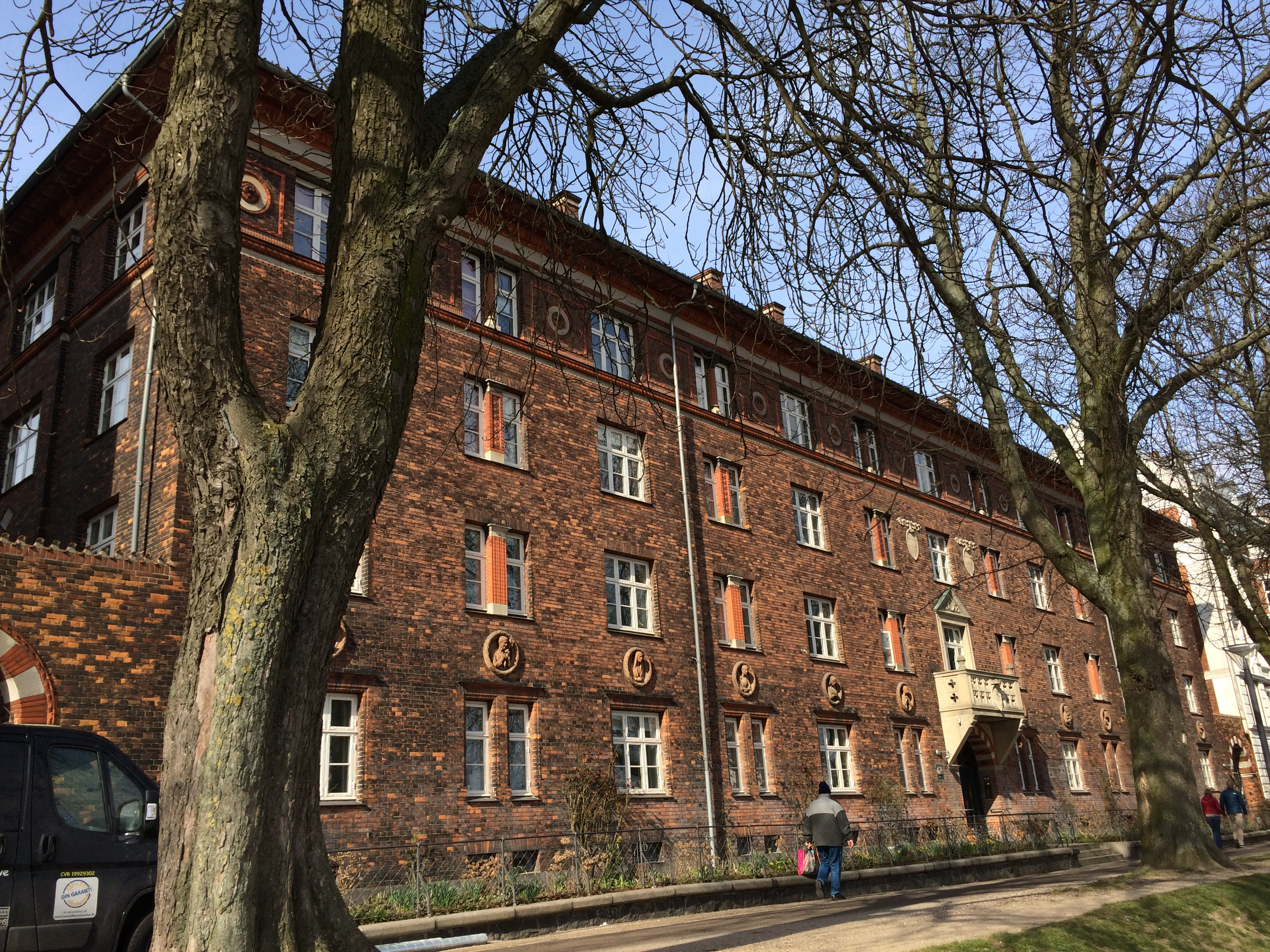
The building seen from the Lakes

Soldenfeldts Stiftelse is a listed property overlooking Sortedam Lake in the Østerbro district of Copenhagen, Denmark.

== History ==
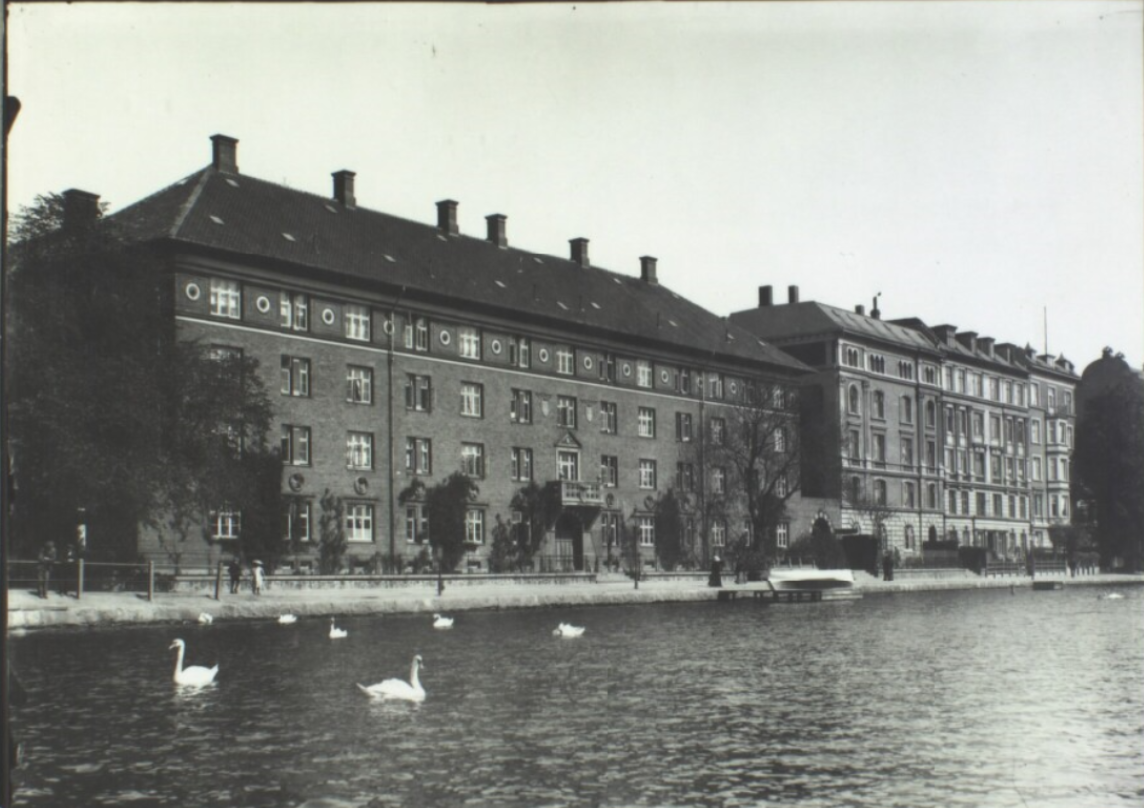
Soldenfeldts Stiftelse

Soldenfeldts Stiftelse was founded by the brothers Joseph and F. W. Soldenfeldt. The property on Sortedam Dossering was built in 1893 and 1894 as a home for elderly (+60) women teachers, house keepers, seamstresses and maids. Its architect was Hermann Baagøe Storck.

== Architecture ==
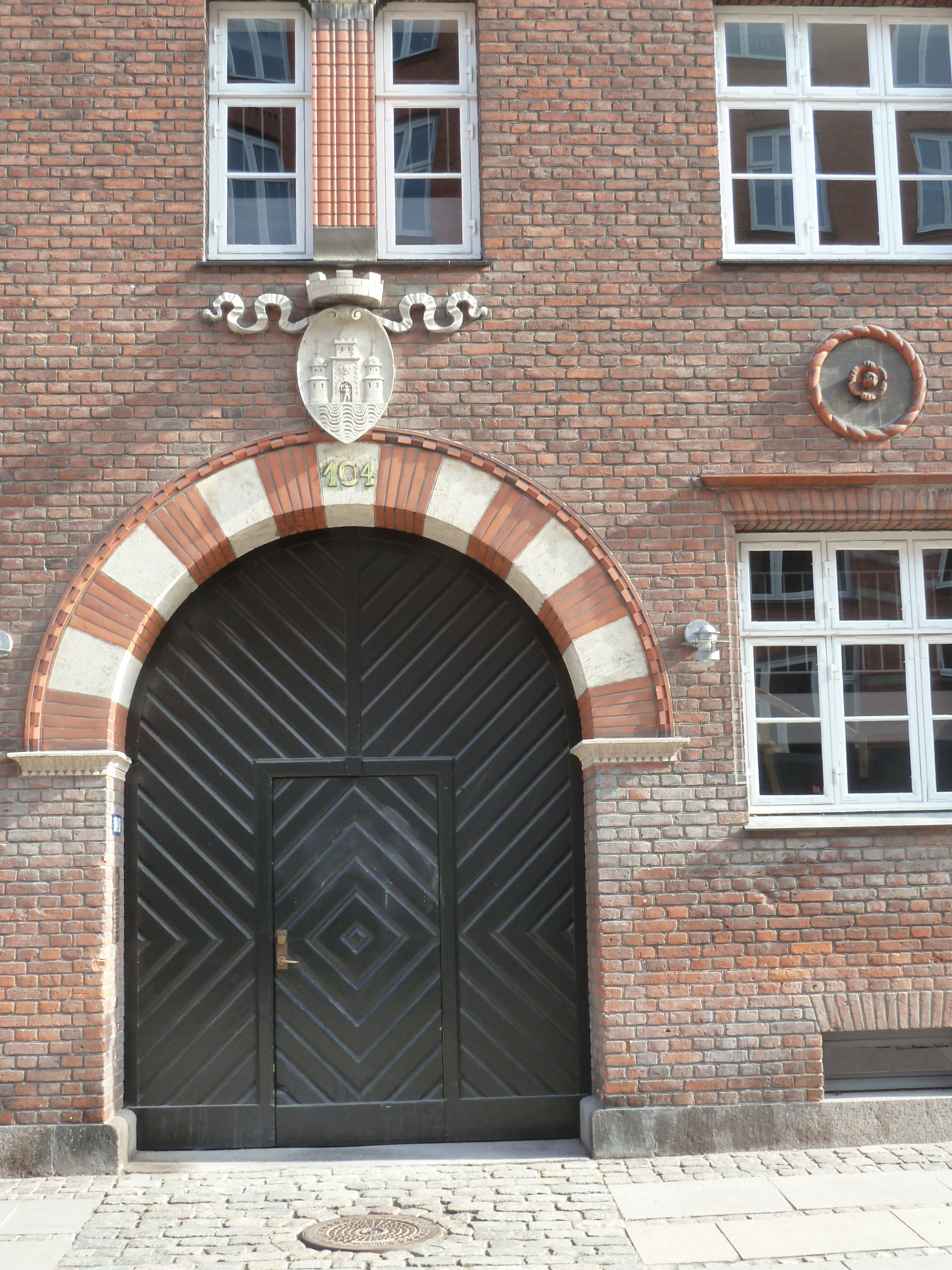
One of the gates on Ryesgade

The four-winged property is built in red brick in a style inspired by Italian medieval and Renaissance architecture.

Its front on Sortedam Doseringen has a balcony above the central main gateway. Decorations include 12 terracotta medallions surrounded by laurel wreaths. They were created by the sculptor Carl Aarsleff and represent the virtues which the residents were originally expected to possess. Temperance, diligence, patience, innocence, humility and faith are seen on the left while hope, charity, peace, vigilance, prudence and truth are seen on the right.

The building was listed on the Danish registry of protected buildings and places in 1997.

== Facilities ==
The property contains 99 apartments of different sizes. All apartments were refurbished in 2002 and have private kitchen and bath room. Other facilities include a banquet hall with murals by Frans Schwartz and a studio, an exercise room and a library on the fourth floor. The central courtyard contains lawns and a fountain.
