= Hans Ahlmann =

Hans Ahlmann may refer to:

- Hans Wilhelmsson Ahlmann (1889–1974), Swedish geographer, glaciologist, and diplomat
- Hans Vilhelm Ahlmann (1852–1928), Swedish and Danish architect
