= Aksel Møllers Have station =

Copenhagen metro station

Aksel Møllers Have
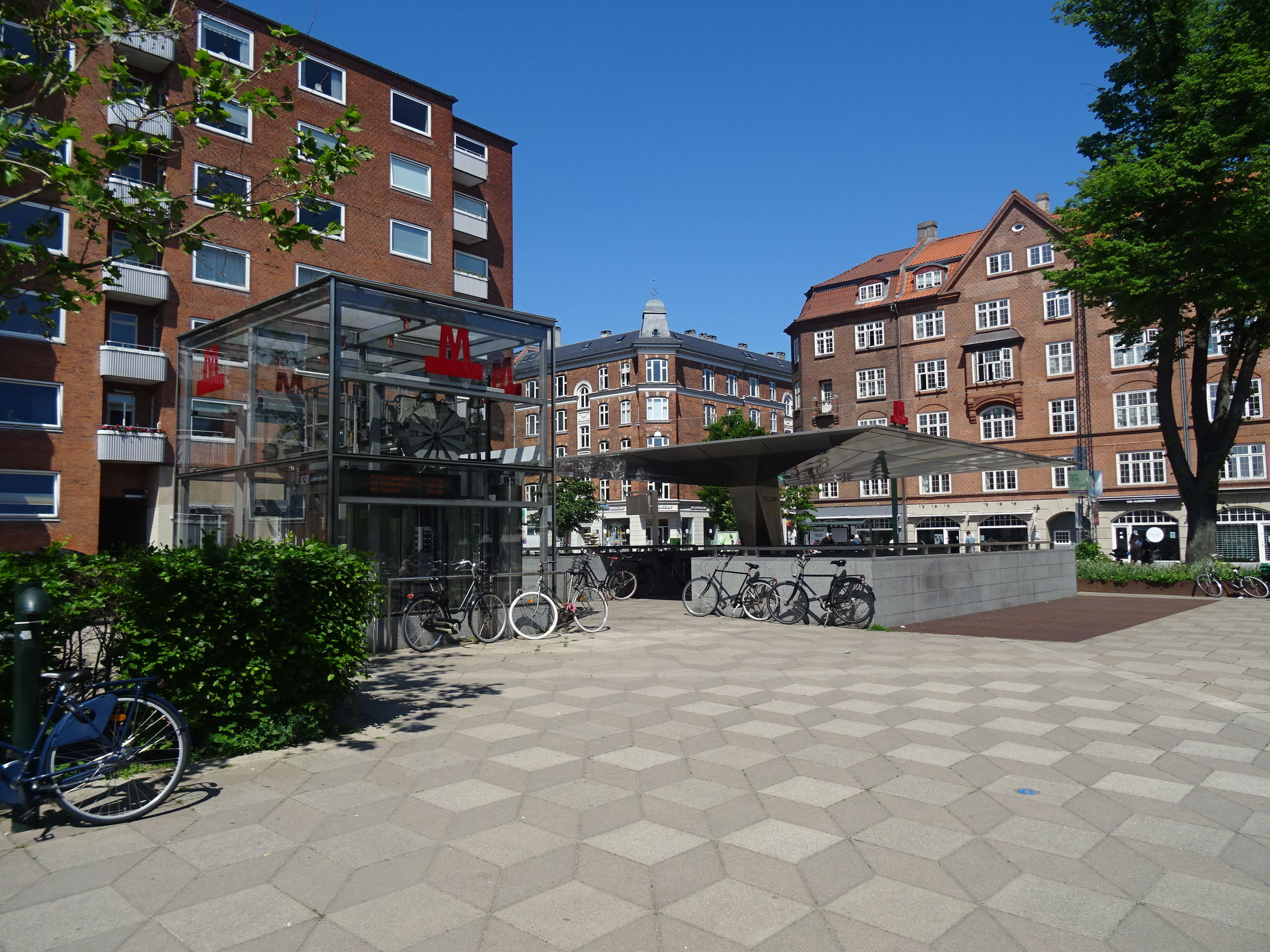

General information
- Location: Godthåbsvej 31, 2000 Frederiksberg
- Coordinates: 55°41′11.2″N 12°32′00.1″E
- System: Copenhagen Metro Station
- Owner: Metroselskabet
- Platforms: 1 island platform
- Tracks: 2
- Bus routes: 2A

Construction
- Structure type: Underground
- Accessible: Yes

Other information
- Station code: Amh

History
- Opened: 29 September 2019; 7 years ago
Location
- Location within Copenhagen Location within Greater Copenhagen Location within Denmark

Aksel Møllers Have station is an underground Copenhagen Metro station located at Aksel Møllers Gave, off Godthåbsvej in the Frederiksberg district of Copenhagen, Denmark. The station is on the City Circle Line (M3), between Frederiksberg Station and Nuuks Plads, and is in fare zone 1.

== History ==
Wire work and archeological excavations began medio 2010. The station was opened on 29 September 2019 together with 16 other stations of the line.

== Service ==
Preceding station	Copenhagen Metro	Following station
Nuuks Plads clockwise	M3	Frederiksberg counter-clockwise
