= Stubbekøbing Church =

Coordinates: 54°53′25″N 12°02′39″E

- Stubbekøbing Kirke
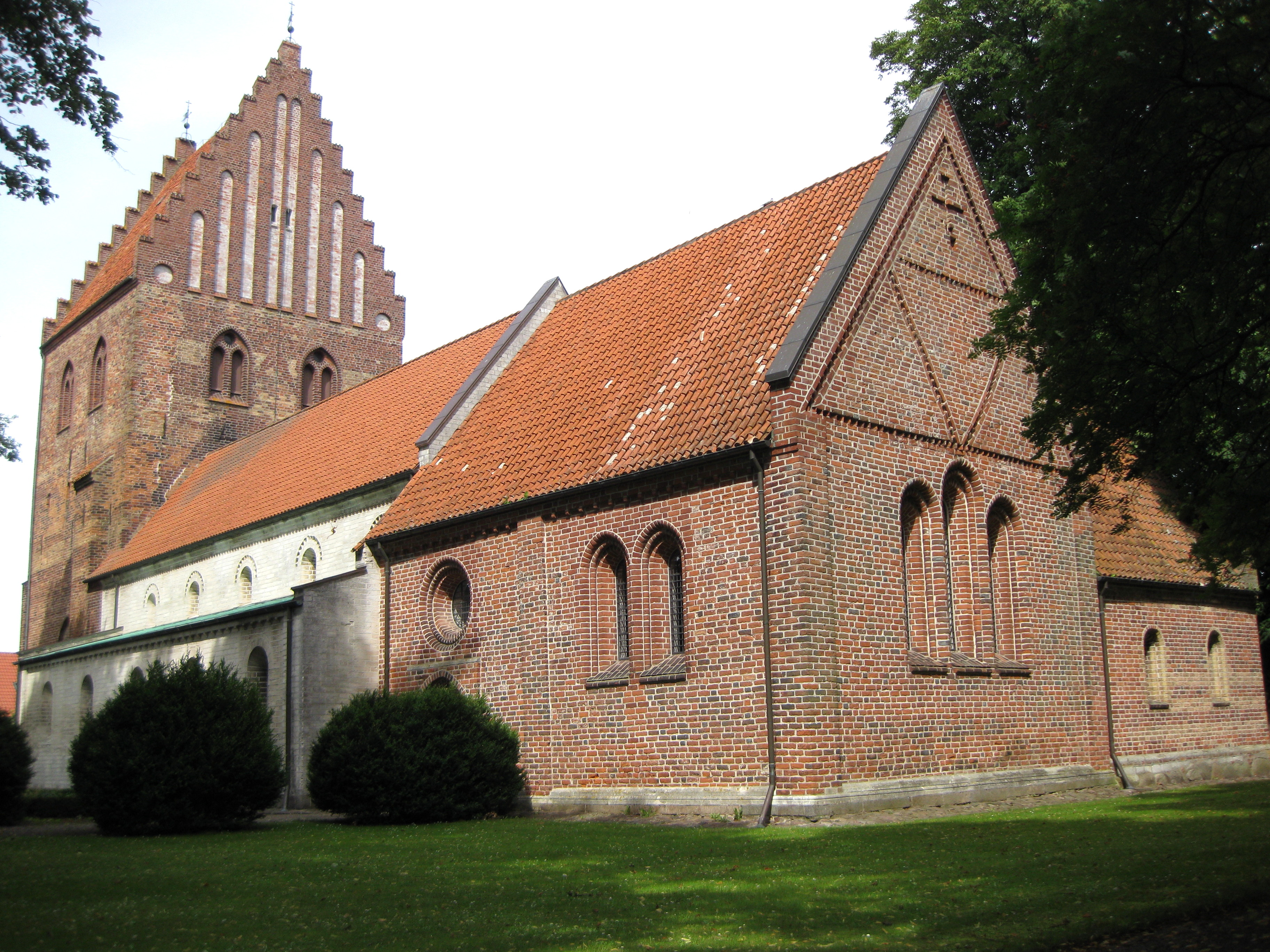
- Stubbekøbing Church
- Location: Stubbekøbing, Falster
- Country: Denmark
- Denomination: Church of Denmark

History
- Dedication: Saint Anne

Architecture
- Architectural type: Romanesque architecture, Gothic architecture

Administration
- Diocese: Diocese of Lolland–Falster
- Deanery: Falster Provsti
- Parish: Stubbekøbing Sogn

Stubbekøbing Church (Danish: Stubbekøbing Kirke) is located in Stubbekøbing some 18 km (11 mi) northeast of Nørre Alslev on the Danish island of Falster. The basilical nave was built of limestone in the Late Romanesque period. Choir and tower are of brick, the choir built in Early Gothic style, tower and the northern chapels in the 15th century in Late Gothic style. In addition to its Renaissance altarpiece and pulpit, it has a variety of old frescos and wall decorations (1300–1500).

== History ==
The church was originally dedicated to St Anne, for whom there is also a chapel, possibly created by the lords of Halskovgaard in the parish of Horbelev as they were remembered in the prayers offered on the feast of St Anne. There are references to the altars of Our Lady, St Peter (1464) and St Olaf (1535), and also to St Gertrude's chapel (1497) although it is uncertain whether it was in the church itself. As a result of the church's lack of funds, on several occasions up to the end of the 16th century, the citizens were permitted to use the municipal taxes to pay for repairs to the church. Furthermore, in 1576, the Crown's part of the tithe from Moseby Parish on Falster was made available for building work for an unspecified number of years. In 1786, every church in Denmark donated a rigsdaler for building the church tower and in 1790 the State paid 1,000 rigsdaler for finishing the top of the tower which was used by sailors as a landmark.

== Architecture ==
The nave was built in the Late Romanesque period but only its south wall and east gable have been preserved, the remainder having been renovated in the same style. The original chancel has been replaced with the present brick structure, probably after a fire in the 13th century. The early Gothic choir has three slightly pointed windows in the gable and also pointed windows on the sides.

At the end of the 13th century, the west gable and the entire north side of the nave were torn down and the church was extended towards the west and north, although only a short stretch of wall around the northern chapel now remains. The tower and the chapels to the north were built of brick in a Late Gothic style, probably in the second half of the 15th century. The chapel to the north of the nave, dedicated to St Anne, is a good example of architecture of the times, built in brick with belts of limestone. This interesting variation of Brick Gothic is not found only in Denmark, but also in the Netherlands, Belgium and Northern Rhineland.

The chancel's north chapel to St Gertrude has belts of red and yellow brick. The upper portion of the tower has been rebuilt several times. By the end of the 19th century, the church was in such a poor state of repair that it was about to be demolished but in 1881, the architects Hermann Baagøe Storck and Vilhelm Ahlmann were invited to undertake a comprehensive restoration. They rebuilt the north side of the nave on the old foundations and the chancel arch was moved to the north. A further restoration was completed in 1995.

== Interior ==
The nave is flanked by arches supported by half columns with trapezoidal capitals. The nave has a flat ceiling while the aisles are vaulted. Shortly after its construction in the 13th century, the chancel was cross-vaulted with dwarf pillars at the corners. The chancel's north chapel is also cross-vaulted. The Renaissance altarpiece (1618) was donated by the Dowager Queen Sophie, the mother of King Christian IV. The pulpit (1634) in the Auricular style is the work of Jørgen Ringnis. Similar to the pulpit in Nykøbing Church, it has five niches with carved figures of Christ and the four evangelists. The Late Gothic crucifix hanging in the chancel arch is from c. 1520. The font in Norwegian marble is from 1798 and the organ facade from 1860.

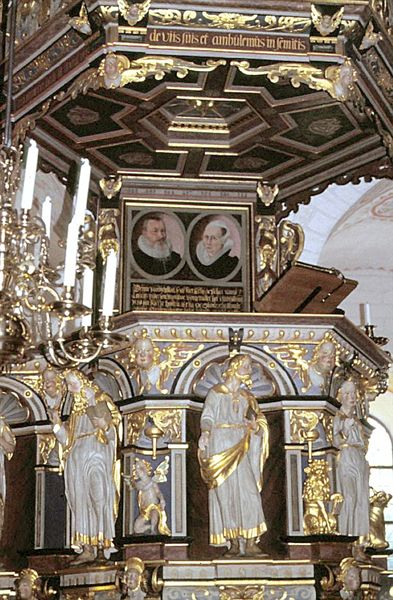
Pulpit (1634)

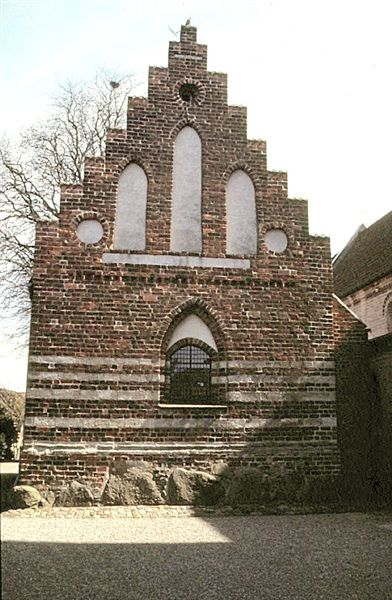
West gable of St Anne's chapel

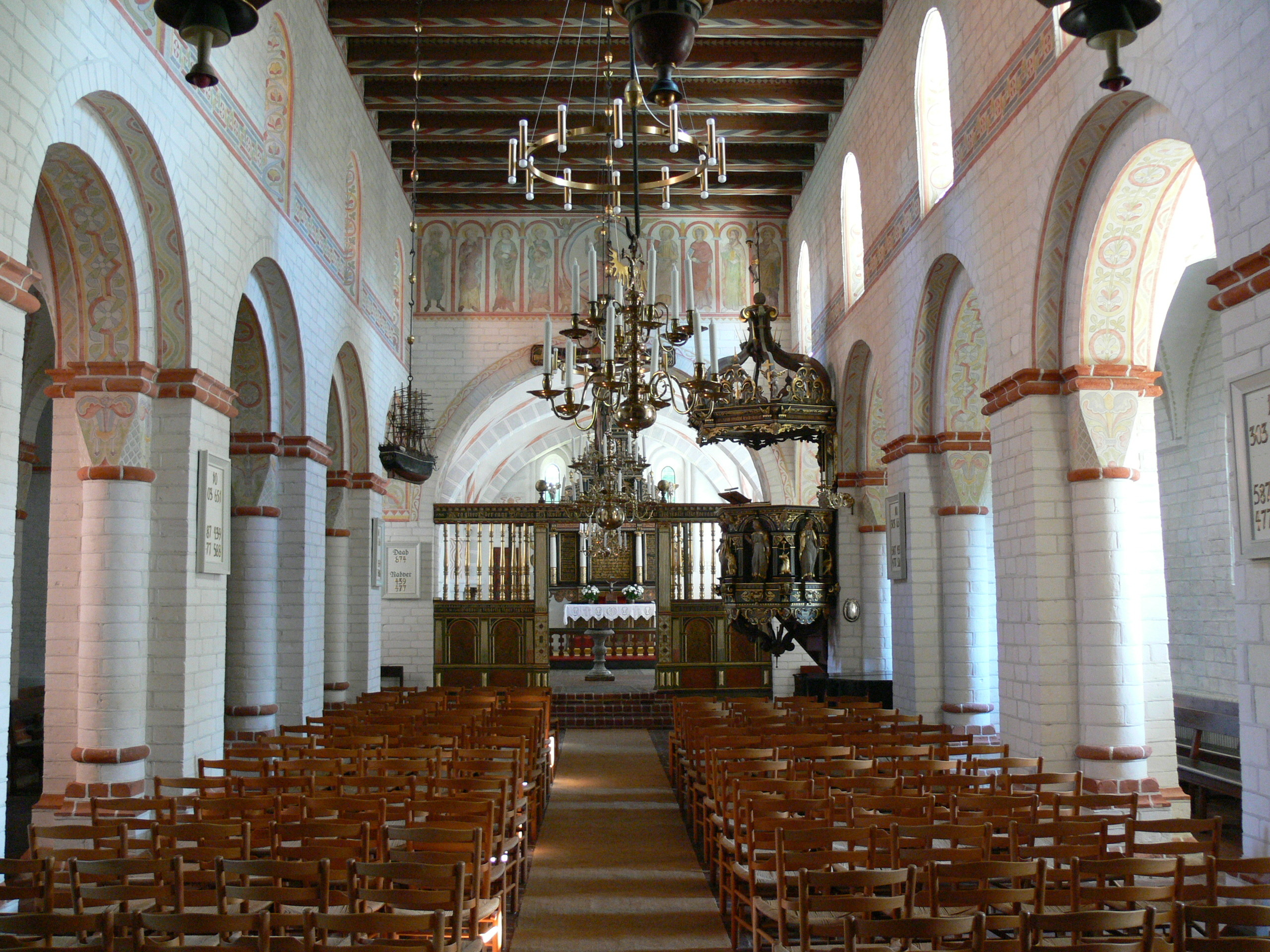
Nave

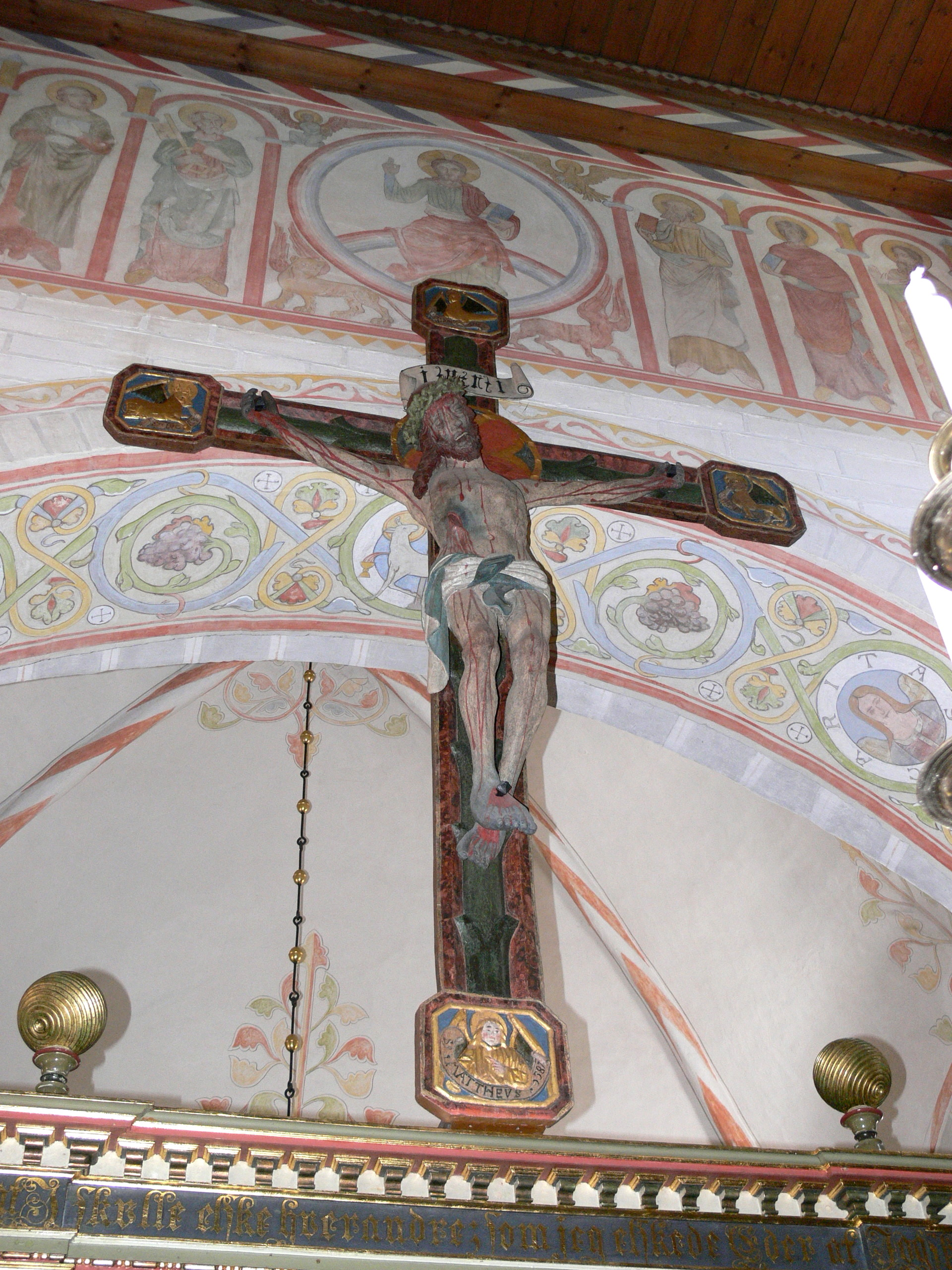
Crucifix in chancel arch (1520)

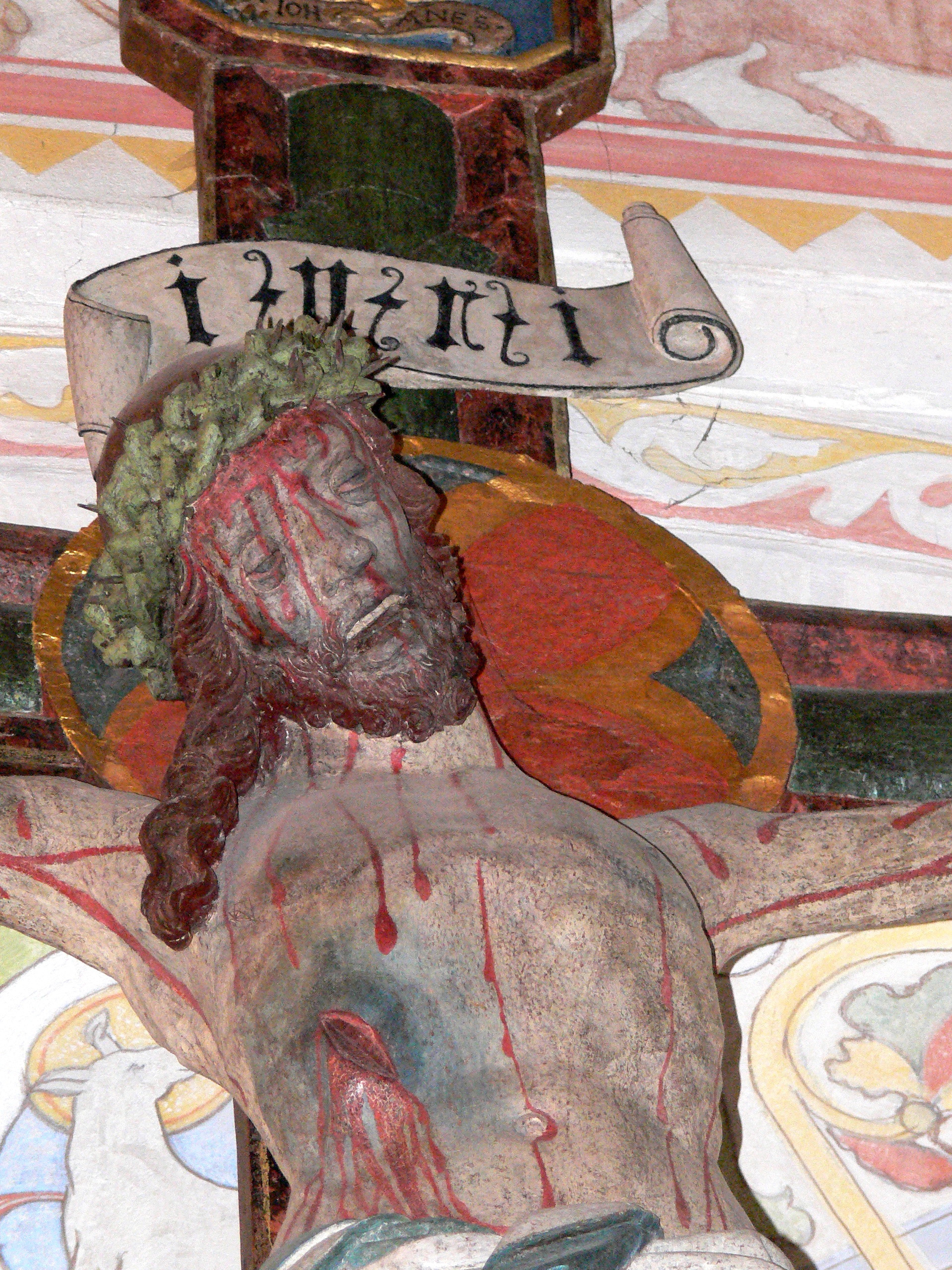
Crucifix: Christ's face

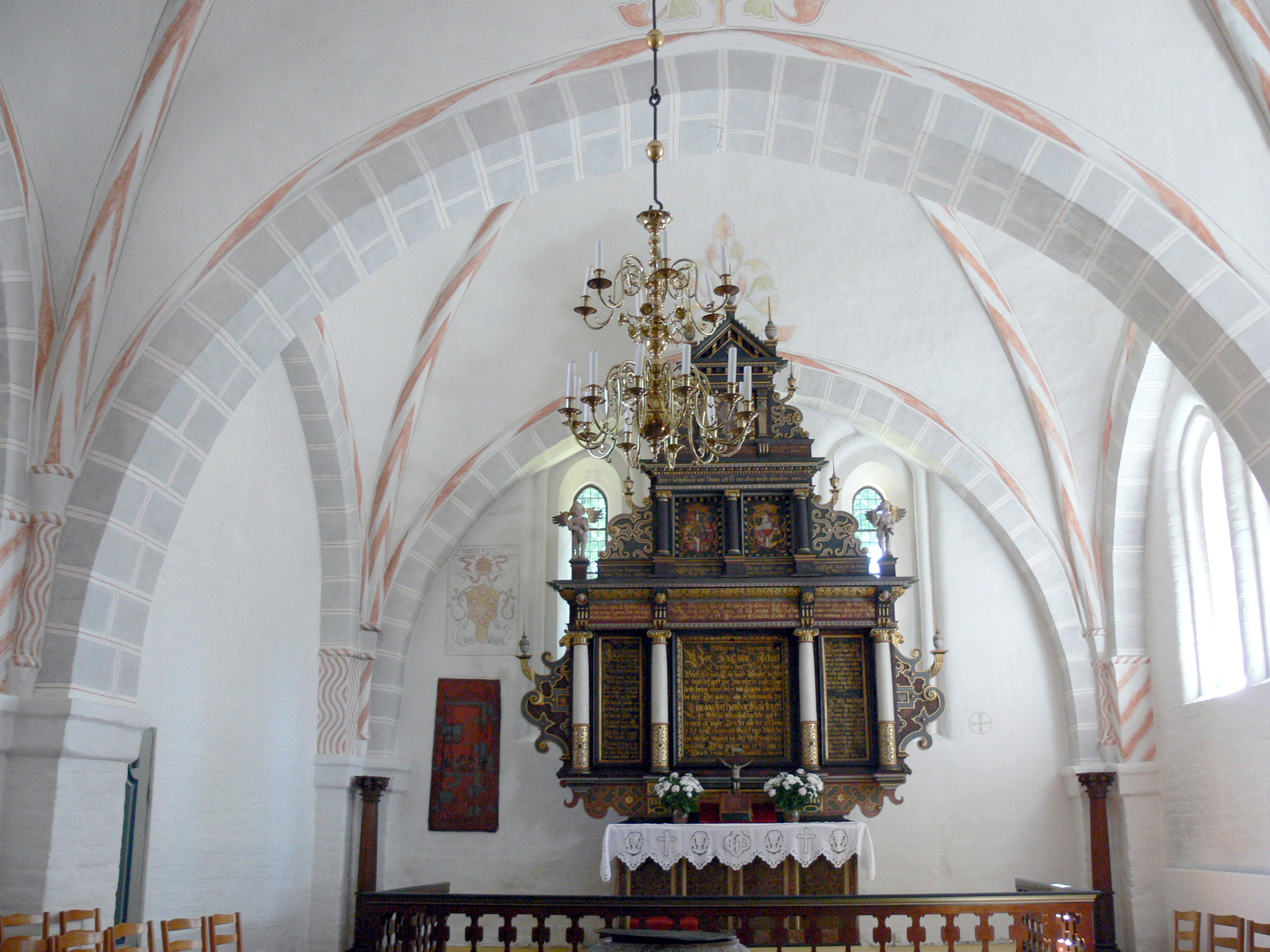
Altarpiece (1618)

== Frescos ==
During the restoration work in 1881, a number of frescos were found including the frieze on the wall above the chancel arch depicting Christ flanked by eight apostles. It dates from the second half of the 13th century. Two paintings of St Eligius were also discovered, depicting him in connection with two different stories, twitching the Devil's nose along with a demoniac horse standing nearby. The decorations on the walls and under the arches depicting red waves and plants in red, green and yellow are from c. 1300. In 1939, frescos from c. 1480 were discovered in St Anne's chapel. Those on the vaults were covered again with whitewash but those on the walls were preserved. They depict St Martin riding on a horse and St Roch with a book in his left hand. Other frescos were discovered in the church but were not restored or preserved. The coat of arms of Pope Leo X can be seen on the chancel's north wall.

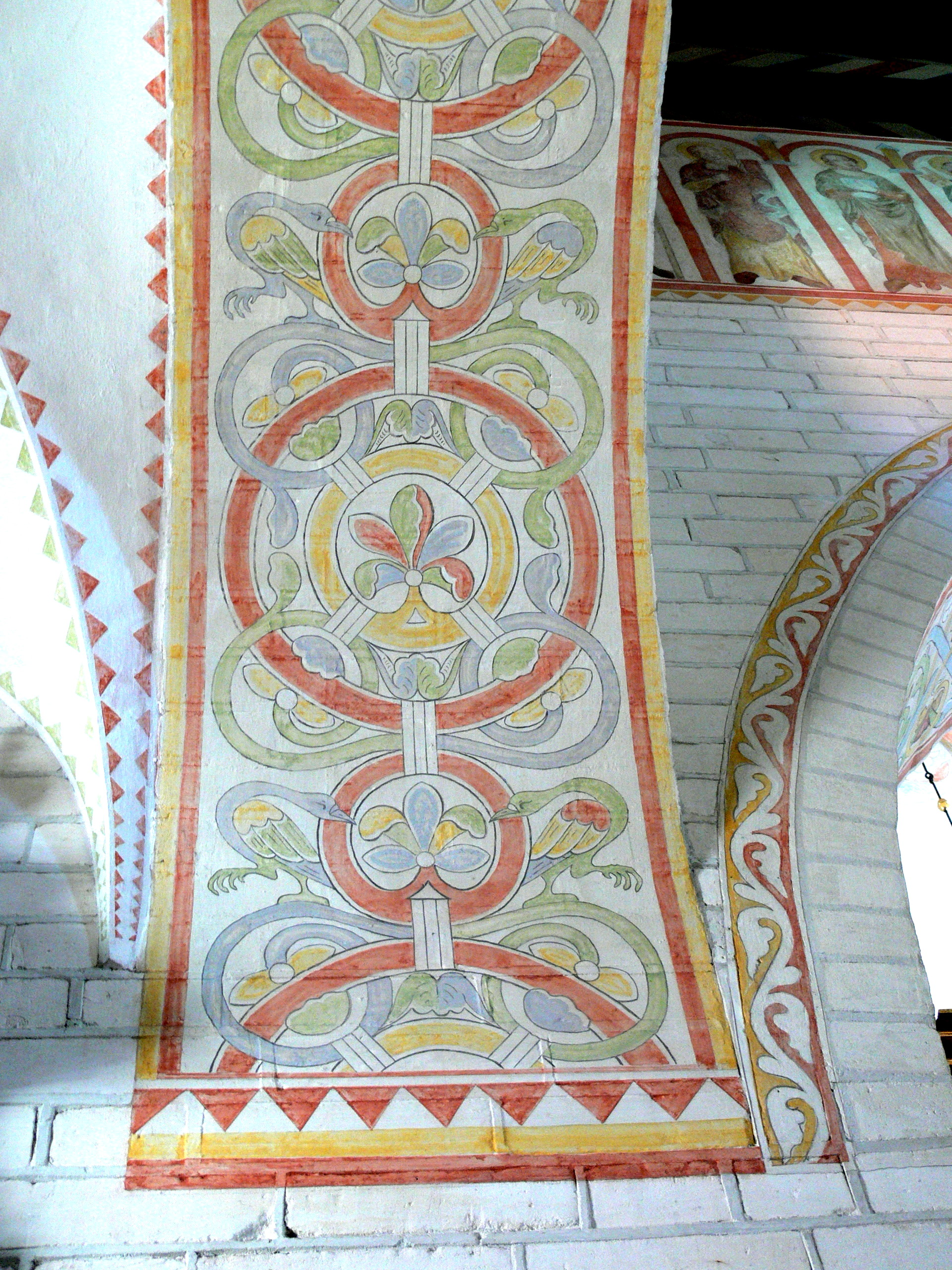
Chancel arch decorations

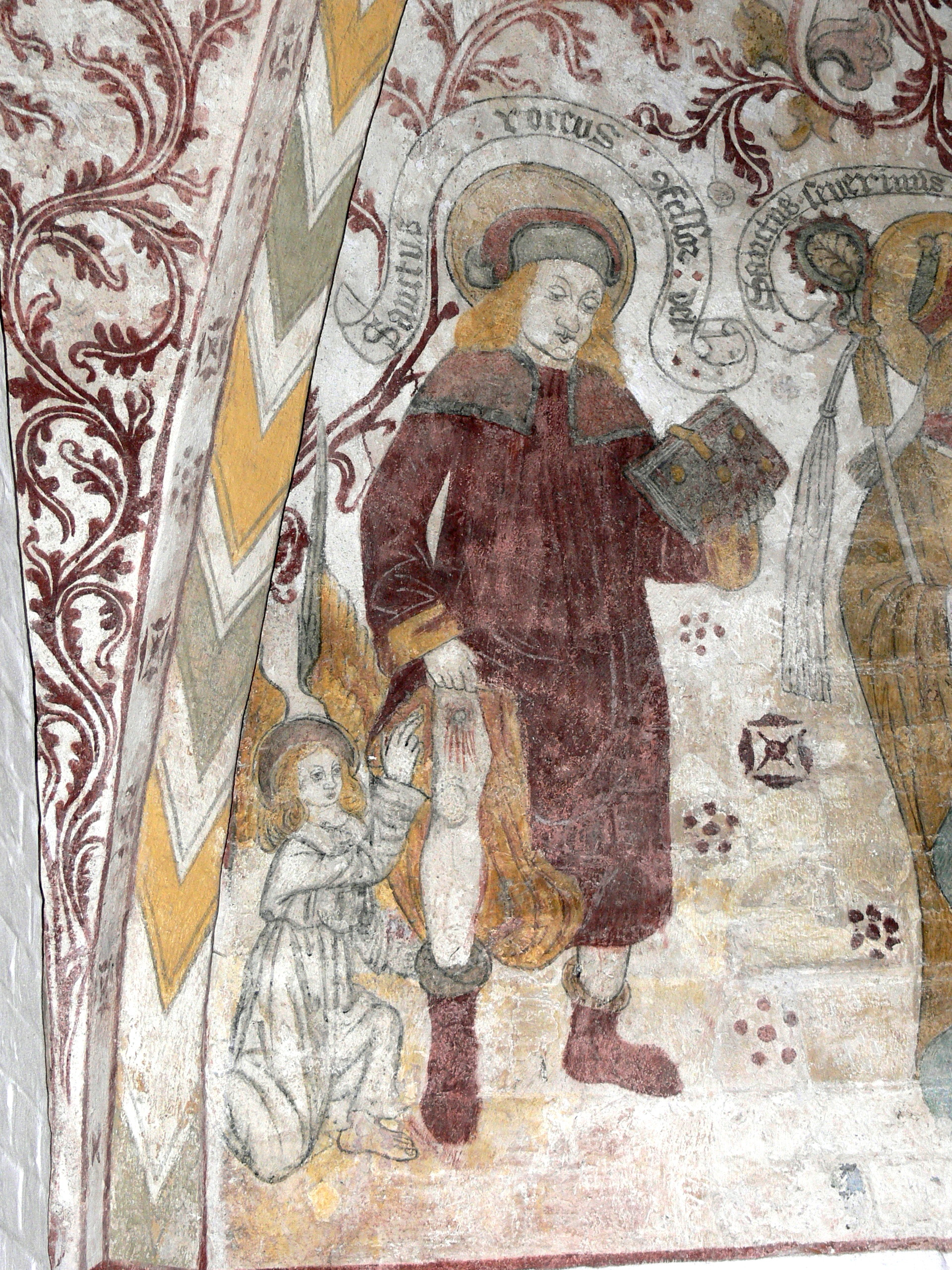
Fresco: St Roch

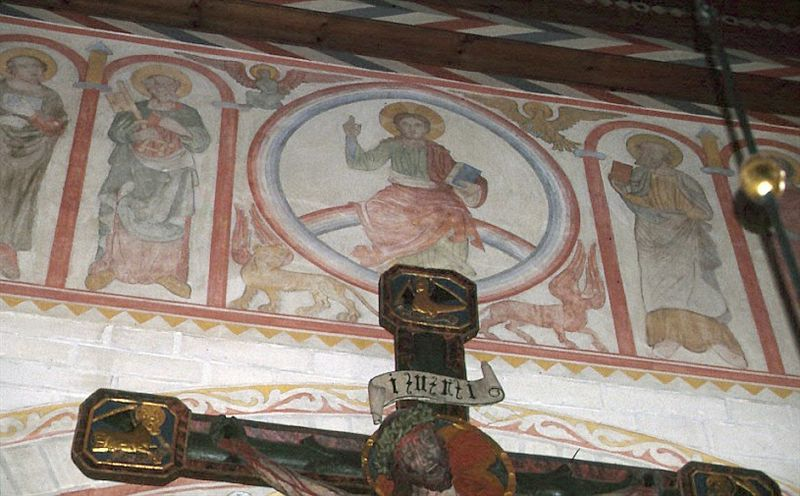
Fresco: Majestas Domini frieze

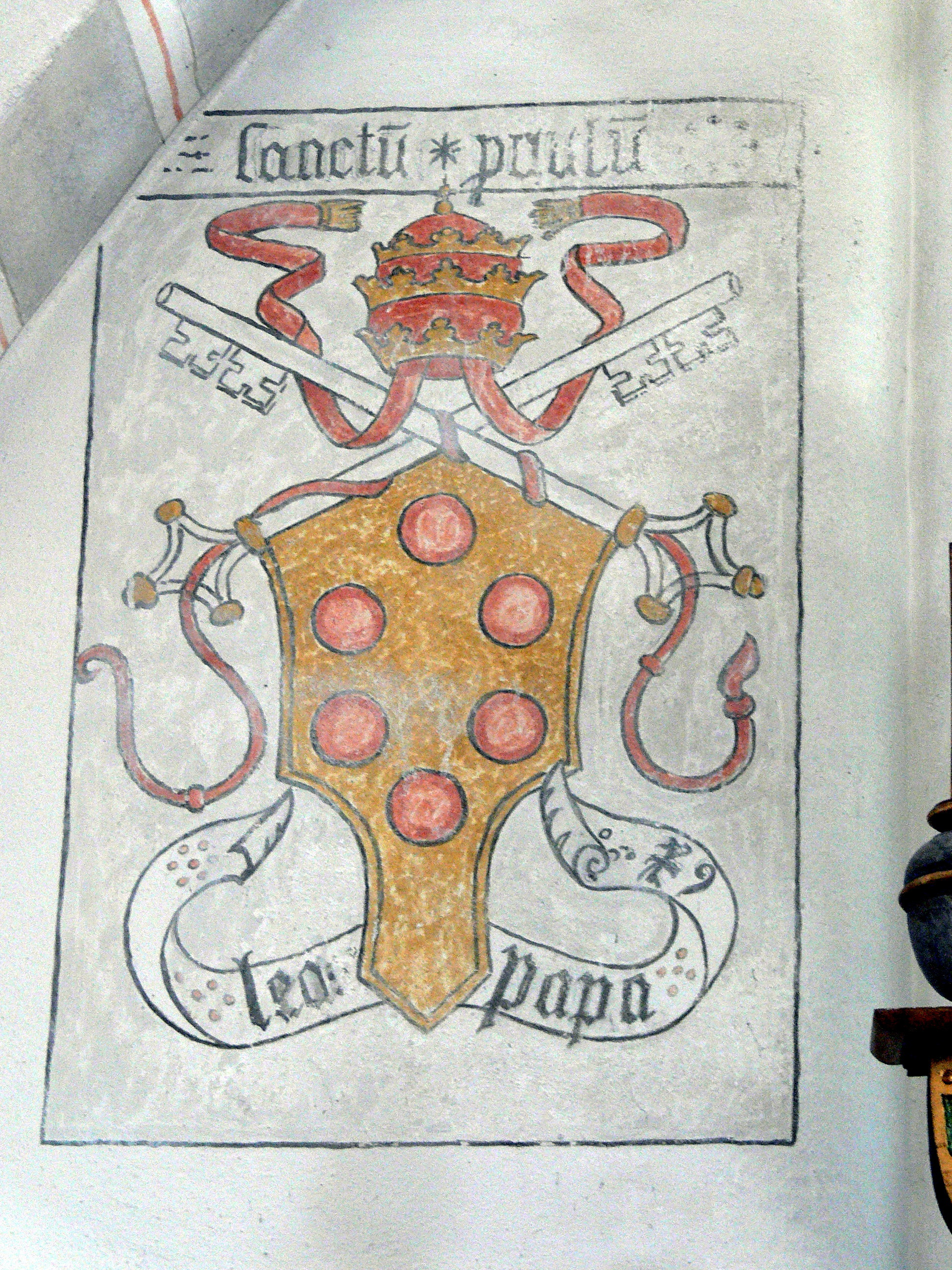
Fresco: Arms of Pope Leo X (1521)

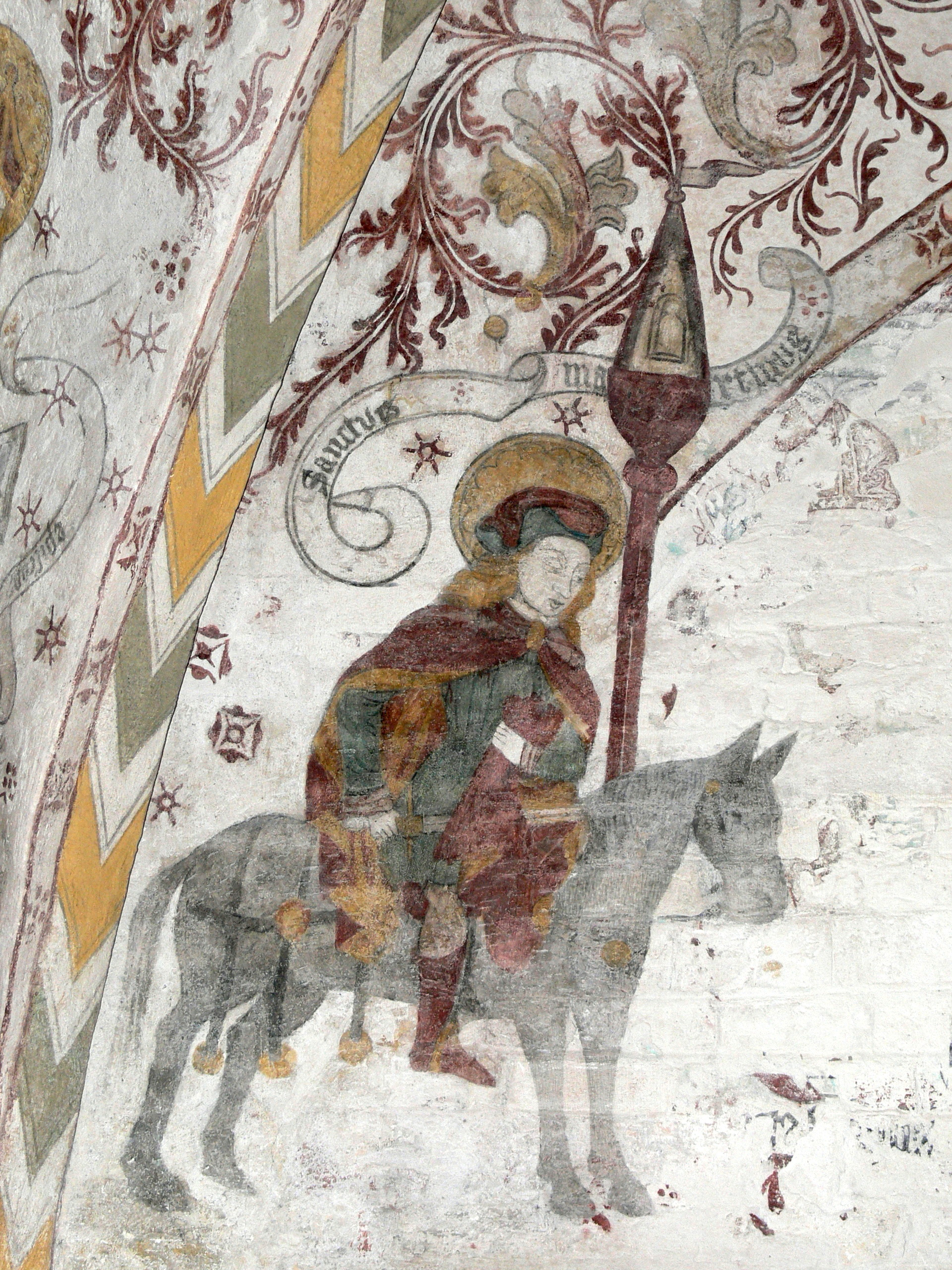
Fresco: St Martin on horseback
