= Holy Cross Church, Copenhagen =

Holy Cross Church
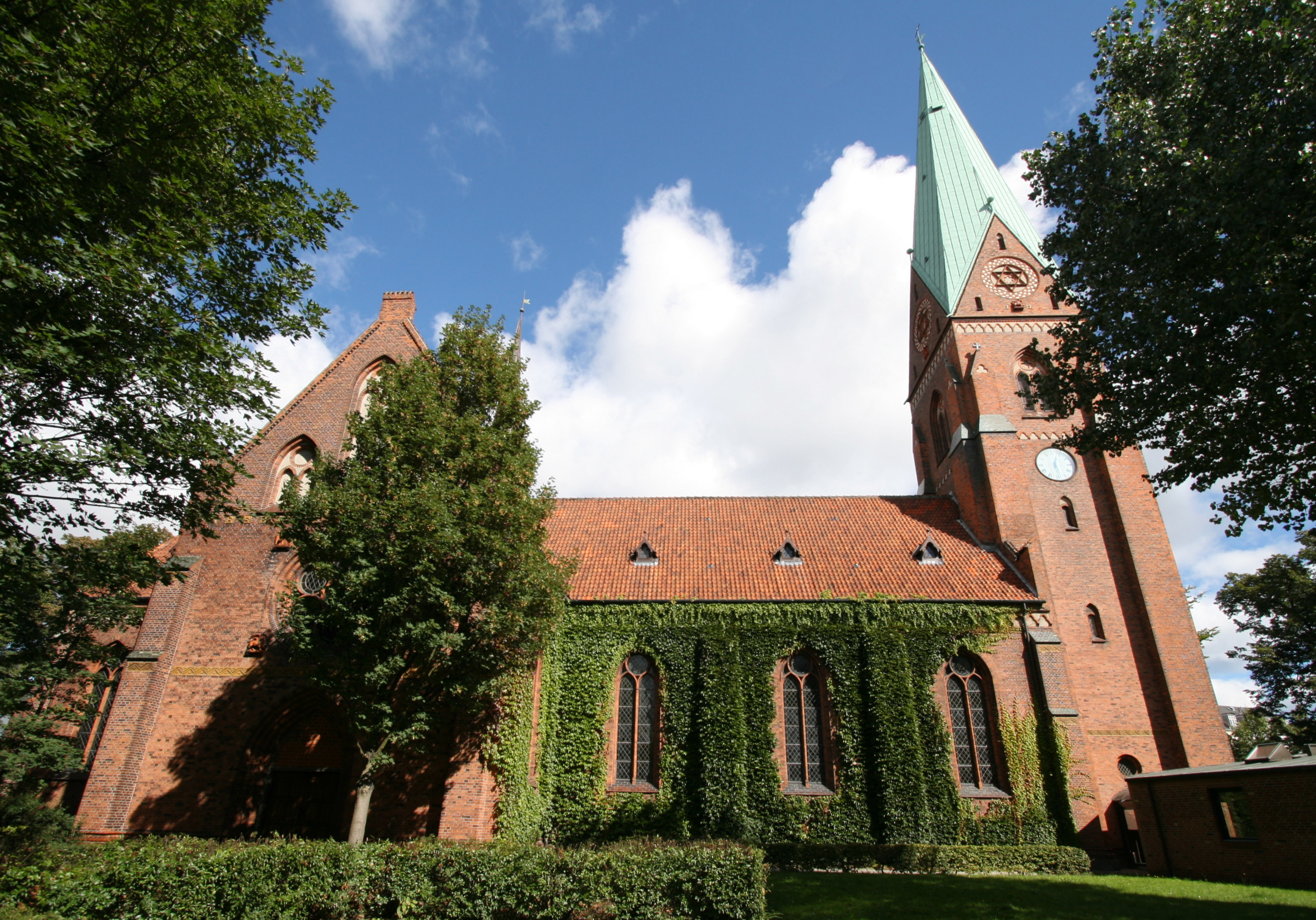
- Holy Cross Church seen from Hans Tavsens Gade
- Holy Cross Church
- 55°41′15.6″N 12°33′5″E
- Location: Nørrebro, Copenhagen
- Country: Denmark
- Denomination: Church of Denmark

History
- Status: Church

Architecture
- Architect: Hermann Baagøe Storck
- Architectural type: Church
- Style: National Romantic
- Completed: 1890

Specifications
- Materials: Brick

Administration
- Diocese: Diocese of Copenhagen

The Holy Cross Church (Danish: Hellig Kors Kirke) is a Church of Denmark parish church located at the corner of Kapelvej (No. 38) and Hans Tavsens Gade in the Nørrebro district of Copenhagen, Denmark. The church was built in 1887–1890 to a National Romantic design by Hermann Baagøe Storck.

== History ==
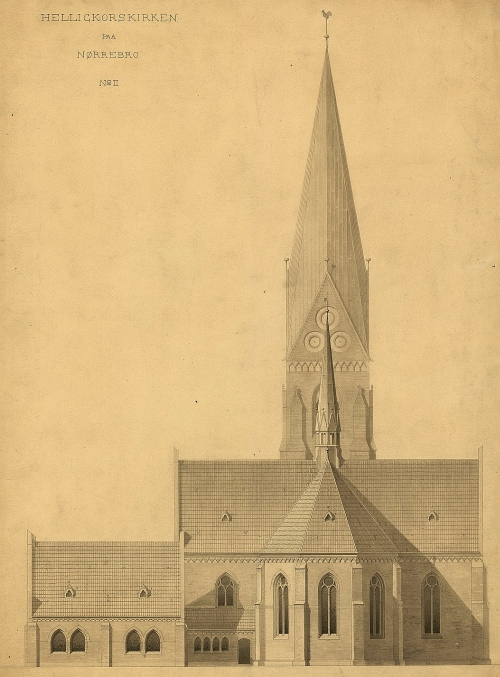
One of Storch's renderings

In 1886, Københavns Præstekonvent decided to build a new church in the Rantzausgade/Kapelvej neighbourhood of Nørrebro. Further work with realizing the project was placed in the hands of a commission headed by provost Conrad Rothe and mayor Hans Hansen. The city donated a corner of the old cholera cemetery adjacent to Assistens Cemetery for the project. Funding for construction of the church building came partly from the city and partly from fund-raising among private citizens. One of the largest contributors was coffee wholesaler Gamél but also many local craftsmen made donations. The name was selected in 1887 and was inspired by the location at the end of the Korsgade (Cross Street), whose name had in turn been selected because it crossed Blågårdsgade.

The architect Hermann Baagøe Storck (1839-1922) was charged with designing the church. He presented his first design proposal to the committee in 1887 and the final design was approved in 1888. The most significant change was the windows. The building was constructed by master mason Christian Wilhelm Rask Licht's company C. Licht. The church was inaugurated on 19 January 1890 in the presence of members of the royal family.

Holy Cross Parish was at the same time disjoined from St. John'sm Parish, by then, had reached 70,000 residents.

== Architecture ==
The church is built in red brick in the National Romantic style.

== Today ==
Holy Cross Church is as of 1999 located in Blågård Parish. Blågård Church has later been decommissioned and is now used as a community centre.

== Cultural references ==
Holy Cross Church was used as a filming location in the 1994 thriller Nattevagten (1994).
