= Hulsig Church =

Coordinates: 57°39′27″N 10°27′35″E

- Hulsig Kirke
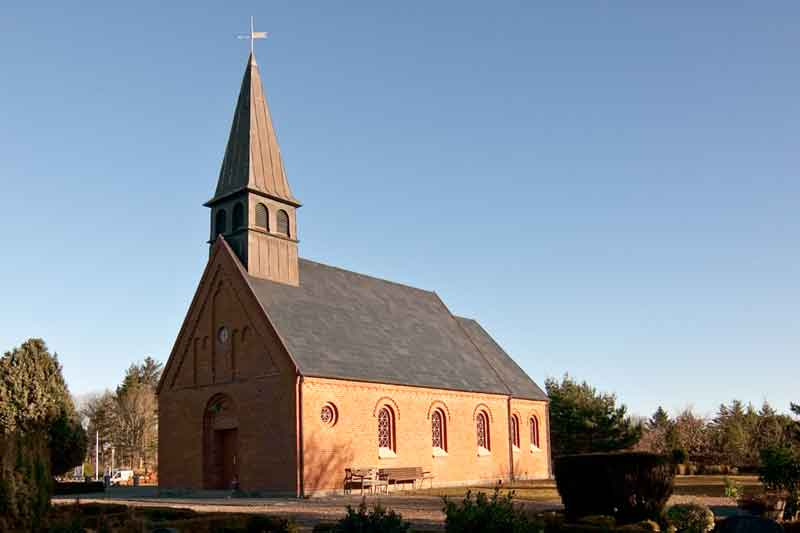
- Hulsig Church
- Location: Hulsig
- Country: Denmark
- Denomination: Church of Denmark

Architecture
- Architect: Vilhelm Ahlmann
- Architectural type: Romanesque revival
- Completed: 1894

Administration
- Diocese: Diocese of Aalborg
- Deanery: Frederikshavn Provsti
- Parish: Hulsig Sogn

Hulsig Church (Danish: Hulsig Kirke) is a church located in the village of Hulsig, 10 km (6.2 mi) south of Skagen in the far north of Jutland, Denmark.

== History and description ==
The little church which stands alone in the sand dunes close to the main road was completed in 1894. Designed by Vilhelm Ahlmann in the Neo-Romanesque style, the red-brick building consists of a triangular chancel and a nave. At the west end, there is a small bell tower with a spire. The painting on the altarpiece is a copy of Joakim Skovgaard's Hyrden finder det bortløbne lam (The Shepherd finds the Lost Sheep). The organ from 1972 was designed by Peter Bruhn.
