= Vilhelm Ahlmann =

Swedish and Danish architect

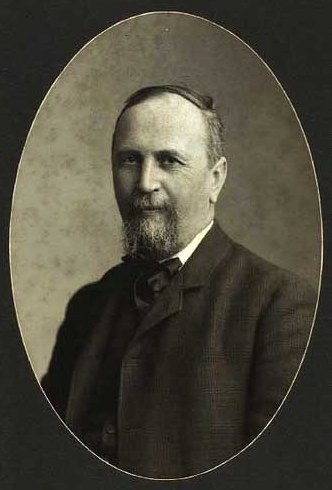
- Photographed by Julie Laurberg
- Born: Hans Vilhelm Ahlmann; February 14, 1852; Skåne, Sweden
- Died: May 12, 1928 (aged 76); Hillerød, Denmark
- Burial place: Frederiksberg Ældre Kirkegård

Hans Vilhelm Ahlmann (14 February 1852 – 12 May 1928) was a Swedish and Danish architect. He is credited with designing and restoring a variety of churches in Denmark.

== Biography ==
Ahlmann was born in Scania, Sweden. He graduated from the KTH Royal Institute of Technology in 1869, and then studied at the Royal Swedish Academy of Fine Arts from 1870 until 1876.

He worked as an apprentice with architect Hermann Baagøe Storck during which time he principally conducted restoration work. Among his works are restorations of Kolding Church (1875), Stubbekøbing Church (1881), St. Peter's Church, Næstved (1890) and Holstebro Church (1907).

Many of his designs were for buildings in Aarhus, such Aarhus Katedralskole (1894). His original architectural designs included Hulsig Church from 1893 to 1894, Frederikshavn Church (Frederikshavn Kirke) in 1892, Sørig Church (Sørig Kirke) in 1900, and Holstebro Church (Holstebro Kirke) from 1906 to 1907.

He exhibited at Charlottenborg Spring Exhibition in 1879 and the Nordic Exhibition of 1888 in Copenhagen. He contributed his architectural expertise to books such as Danske Tufstens-Kirker (1894), Grenaa Egnens Kridtstenskirker (1896), Jydske Granitkirker (1903) and Ældre nordisk Architektur.

Ahlmann died in Hillerød and was buried at Frederiksberg Ældre Kirkegård.

== See also ==
- List of Danish architects
