= Råbjerg Mile =

Migrating coastal dune in Denmark

Coordinates: 57°38′53″N 10°24′22″E

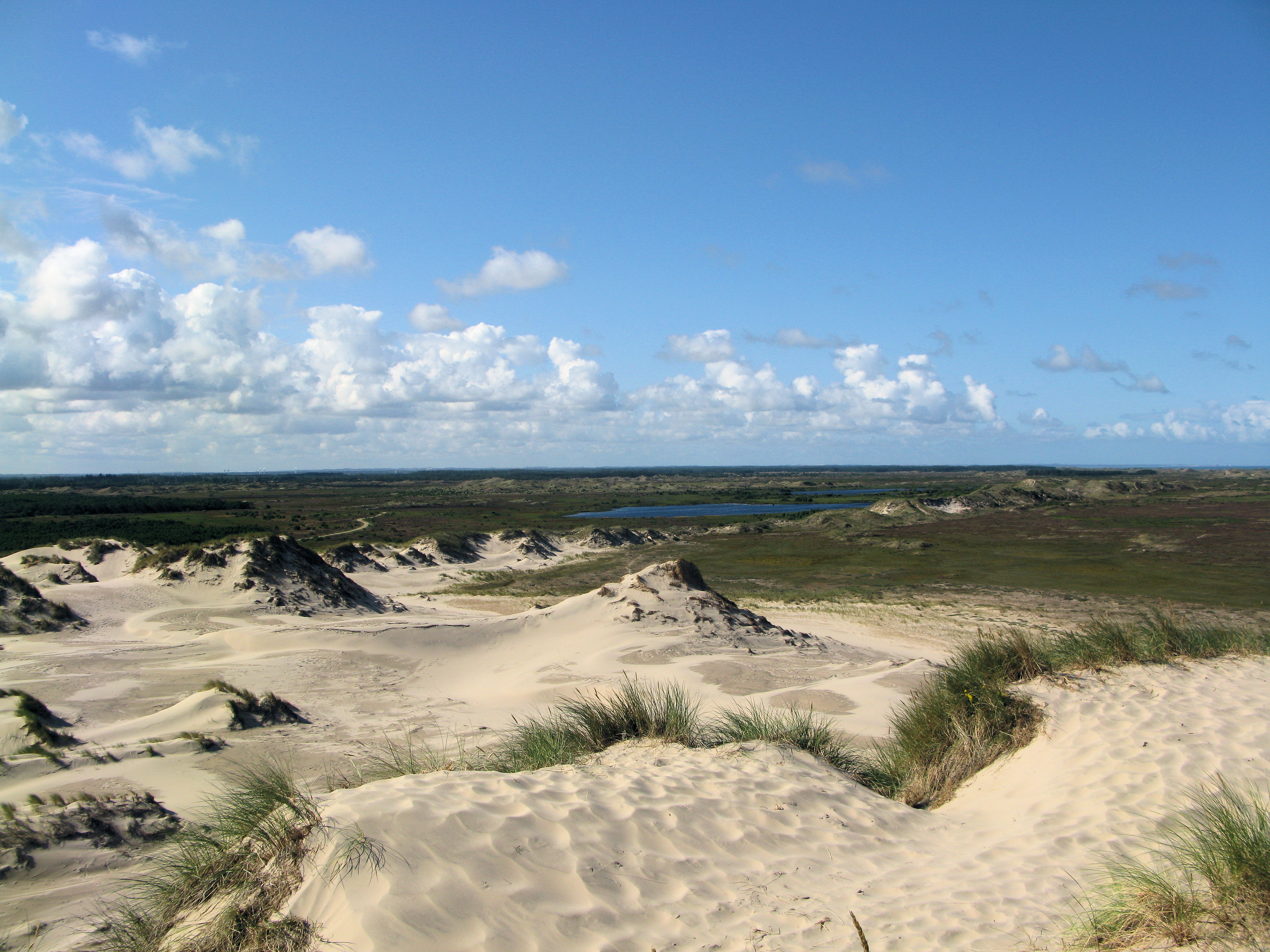
Råbjerg mile

Råbjerg Mile is a migrating coastal dune between Skagen and Frederikshavn, Denmark. It is the largest moving dune in Northern Europe with an area of around 2 km^{2} (0.77 sq mi) and a height of 40 m (130 ft) above sea level. It is also the only major stretch of migrating dunes in Denmark. The dune contains a total of 4 million m^{3} of sand. The wind moves it in a north-easterly direction up to 18 metres (59 ft) a year. The dune leaves a low, moist layer of sand behind it, trailing back westwards towards Skagerrak, where the Mile originally formed more than 300 years ago. Over 250,000 people visit the dune every year.

== History ==
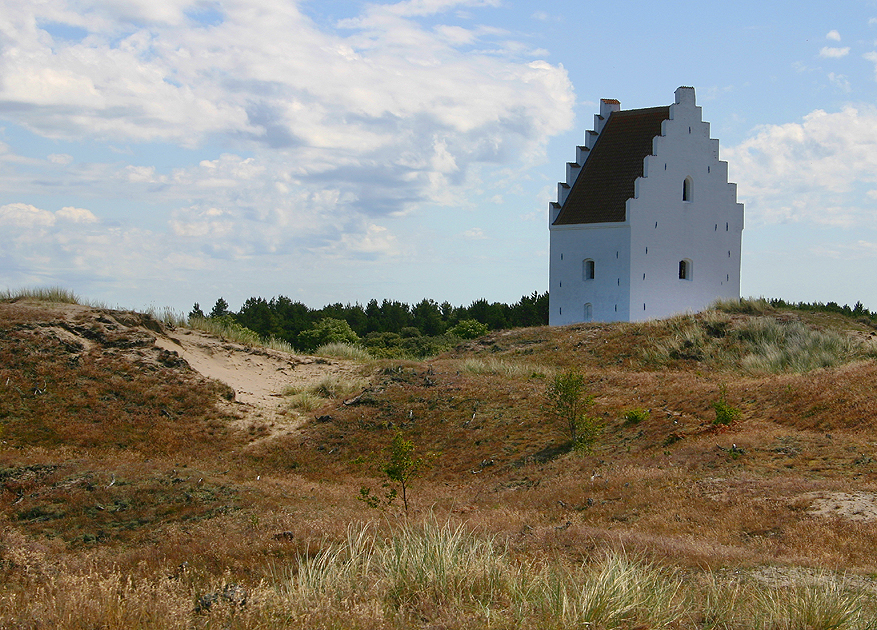
The Sand-Covered Church was once the area's largest church. Now, only the church tower remains.

In northern Jutland in the 16th and 17th centuries, shifting dunes were a problem for the population: huge dunes, some stretching up to 7 km (4.3 mi) inland, drove them back from the coastal areas, but in the 19th century the government acted to alleviate the problem. The Sand Drift Act of 1857 allowed the state to buy or expropriate areas of sand drift, and a further Act in 1857 allowed the purchase of areas adjacent to the drifts. Dune grasses and conifers were planted to stabilize the sands and these plantations became common after 1880. Although barren, the dune zone allowed limited sheep farming and some inshore fishing. By the 1950s, the dune drifts were under control.

An important example of the power of the migrating sand is the Sand-Covered Church. Built in the late 14th century and dedicated to Saint Lawrence of Rome, it was almost entirely enveloped in sand by the 18th century. By 1795, the church was abandoned to the sands. The main building was demolished, leaving the tower standing, still visible above the sands.

== Conservation ==
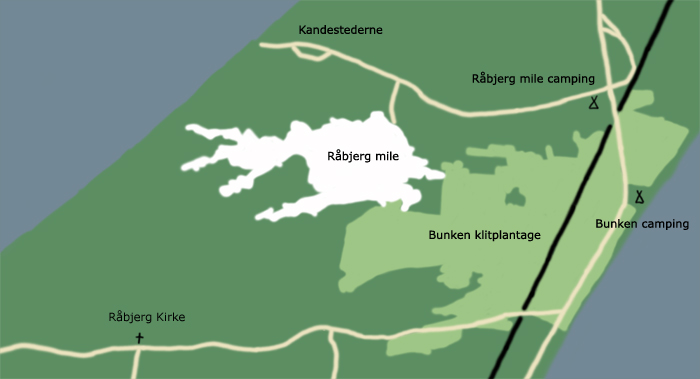
A map of the Råbjerg mile showing its current position

While the majority of dunes were stabilised by planting, the Råbjerg Mile was left to allow future generations to understand the problem of sand dune drift. The central area of the Mile was purchased by the State in 1900, and after the Conservation of Nature Act in 1917 further surrounding areas were purchased. The dune is drifting out of the government-owned area and discussion over further conservation legislation is taking place.

The area is an internationally important staging site for migrating raptors and a breeding site for the Eurasian golden plover (Pluvialis apricaria) and the wood sandpiper (Tringa glareola).
