= Nørrebros Runddel station =

Copenhagen metro station

Nørrebros Runddel
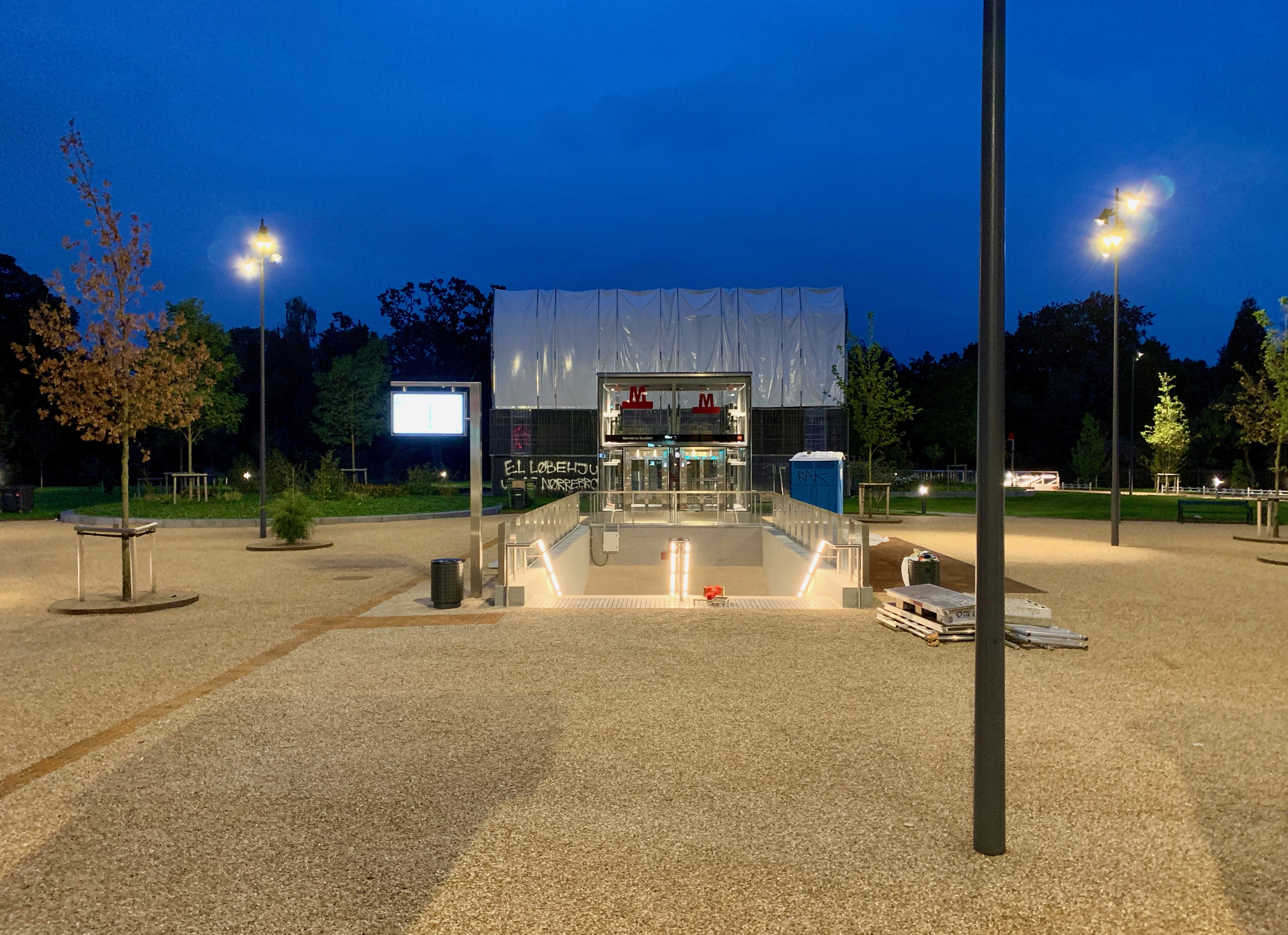

General information
- Location: Nørrebrogade/Jagtvej, 2200 Copenhagen N
- Coordinates: 55°41′38.2″N 12°32′55.3″E
- System: Copenhagen Metro Station
- Owner: Metroselskabet
- Platforms: 1 island platform
- Tracks: 2
- Bus routes: 5C, 350S, 18

Construction
- Structure type: Underground
- Accessible: Yes

Other information
- Station code: Nør
- Fare zone: 2

History
- Opened: 29 September 2019; 7 years ago
Location
- Location within Copenhagen Location within Greater Copenhagen Location within Denmark

Nørrebros Runddel station is an underground Copenhagen Metro station located at Nørrebros Runddel in the Nørrebro district of Copenhagen, Denmark. The station is on the City Circle Line (M3), between Nuuks Plads and Nørrebro, and is in fare zone 2.

== History ==
The site was formerly part of Assistens Cemetery. The station was opened on 29 September 2019 together with 16 other stations of the line.

The station is built below Nørrebros Runddel, at the intersection of Nørrebrogade and Jagtvej, close to the Assistens Cemetery.

== Design ==
The main staircase faces Nørrebros Runddel. The escalator shaft is clad with yellow, ceramic panels, a reference to the yellow wall that surrounds the cemetery.

== Service ==
Preceding station	Copenhagen Metro	Following station
Nørrebro clockwise	M3	Nuuks Plads counter-clockwise
