= Carl Aarsleff =

Danish sculptor

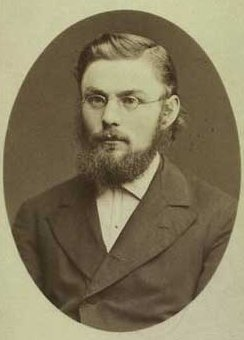
- Photograph of Carl Aarsleff by N.E. Sinding, 1874
- Born: 14 August 1852; Nyborg
- Died: 4 January 1918 (aged 65); Copenhagen
- Education: Royal Danish Academy of Fine Arts
- Known for: Sculptor
- Movement: Naturalism
- Awards: Order of the Dannebrog

Carl Vilhelm Oluf Peter Aarsleff (14 August 1852 – 4 January 1918) was a Danish sculptor.

== Biography ==
Aarsleff was born in Nyborg on the island of Funen. He trained as a wood carver with his father before going to Copenhagen where he studied at the Royal Danish Academy of Fine Arts from 1872. He graduated from the Academy in 1876. At the same time working in the studios of Theobald Stein, Vilhelm Bissen and Jens Adolf Jerichau. In 1876, he won the Academy's small gold medal and in 1880, its large gold medal. In 1881, he went abroad on a travel grant to further his studies, visiting Paris, Italy and Greece.

In 1890 he became a member of the Academy Council. He was a professor at the Royal Danish Academy of Fine Arts from 1901 and from 1914 to 1917 served as its director.

Aarsleff's production of own works was relatively slow to get off the ground. He is best known for a number of statues and statuettes of young adults in a style influenced by Bertel Thorvaldsen and particularly by Jens Adolf Jerichau. He also made decorative works for several large architectural projects, including the Ny Carlsberg Glyptotek. From 1900 to 1912, he was engaged with the restoration of the sarcophagus of Margaret I of Denmark at Roskilde Cathedral.

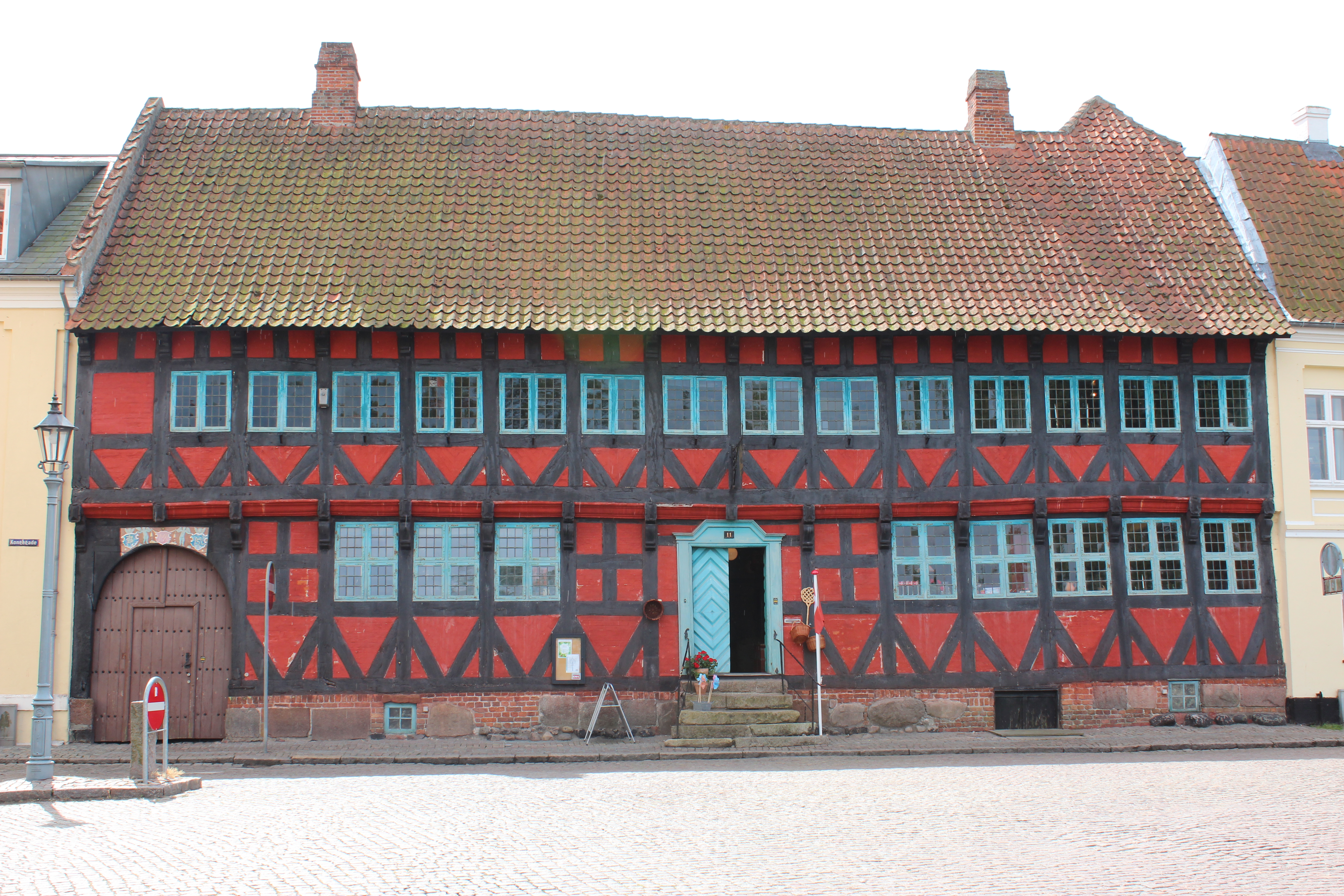
Mads Lerches Gård at Østfyns Museer in Nyborg

He became a Knight of the Order of the Dannebrog in 1912. He died in Copenhagen and was buried at Søllerød Kirkegård.

== Legacy ==
Upon his death in 1918, 77 of his original works were donated to Nyborg. They are today exhibited in an extension to Mads Lerches Gård, a building from 1601 which houses the Østfyns Museer department of cultural history (Borgmestergården).

== See also ==
- Art of Denmark

Cultural offices
Preceded by Viggo Johansen	Director of the Royal Danish Academy of Fine Arts; 1914–1917	Succeeded by Hermann Baagøe Storck
