= Nuuks Plads station =

Copenhagen metro station

Nuuks Plads
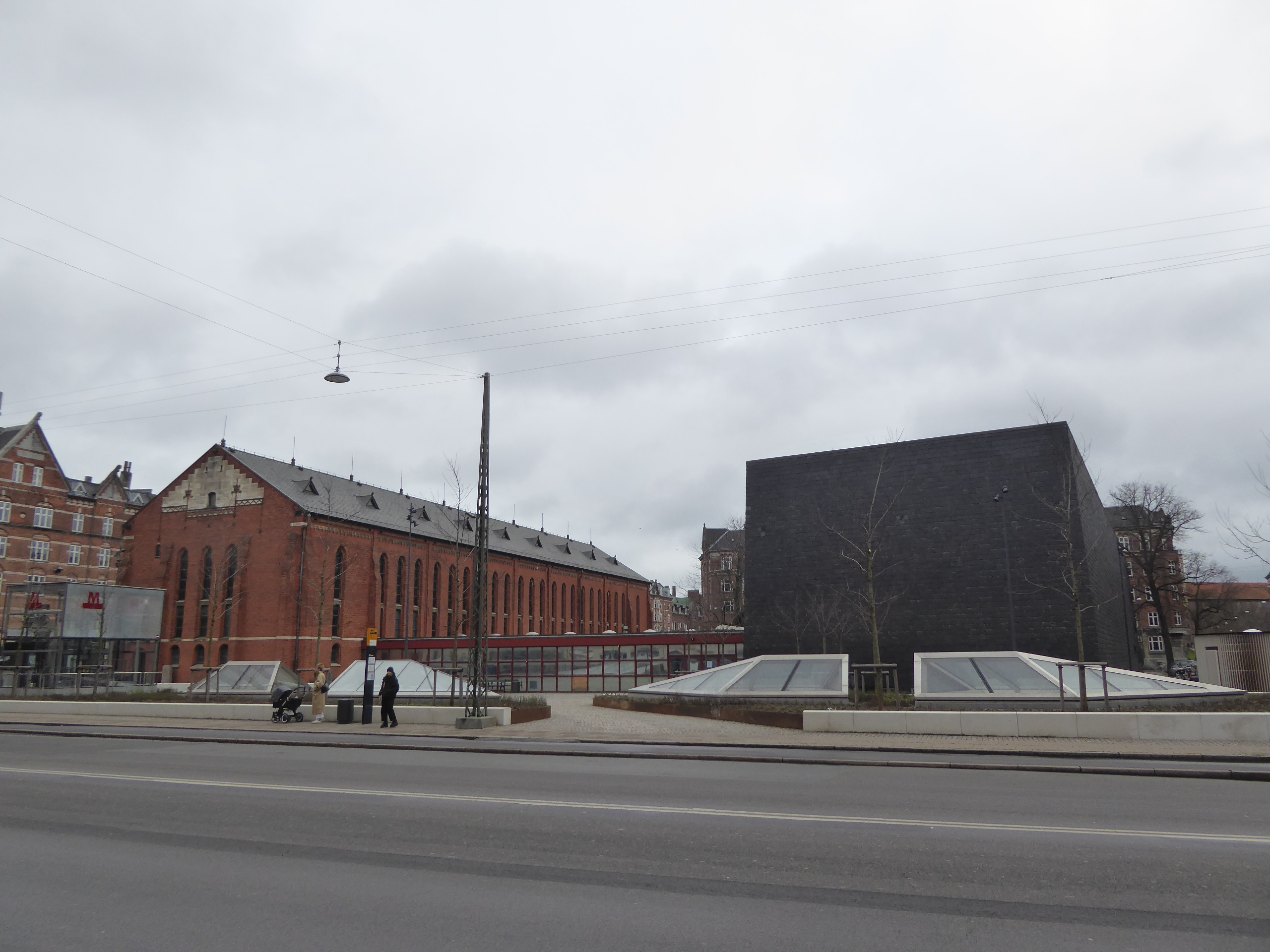
- The station is located in front of the former National archive.

General information
- Location: Rantzausgade 75, 2200 Copenhagen N
- Coordinates: 55°41′20″N 12°32′33.8″E
- System: Copenhagen Metro Station
- Owner: Metroselskabet
- Platforms: 1 island platform
- Tracks: 2
- Bus routes: 18, 68

Construction
- Structure type: Underground
- Accessible: Yes

Other information
- Station code: Nup
- Fare zone: 2

History
- Opened: 29 September 2019; 7 years ago
- Former names: Landsarkivet

Services
Preceding station	Copenhagen Metro	Following station
Nørrebros Runddel clockwise	M3	Aksel Møllers Have counter-clockwise
Location
- Location within Copenhagen Location within Greater Copenhagen Location within Denmark

Nuuks Plads station is an underground Copenhagen Metro station located at Nuuks Plads, off Jagtvej, in the Nørrebro district of Copenhagen, Denmark. The station is on the City Circle Line (M3), between Aksel Møllers Have and Nørrebros Runddel, and is in fare zone 2.

== History ==
The station was opened on 29 September 2019 together with 16 other stations of the line.
