= Hermann Baagøe Storck =

Danish architect and heraldist

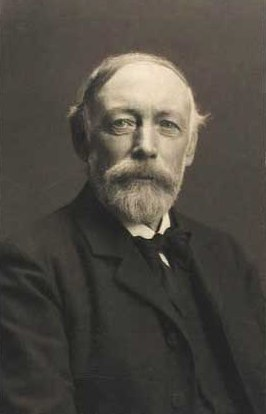
- Born: 18 February 1839; Skibby, Denmark
- Died: 4 December 1922 (aged 83); Copenhagen
- Occupation: Architect
- Buildings: The Hirschsprung Collection

Hermann Baagøe Storck (18 February 1839 – 4 December 1922) was a Danish architect and heraldist. As an architect, he is mainly known for the restoration of historic buildings. Among his own designs, his building for the Hirschsprung Collection in Copenhagen is the most widely known.

== Early life and career ==
Hermann Baagøe Storck was born on 18 February 1839 in the small town of Skibby on the Hornsherred peninsula, west of Copenhagen. He attended the Royal Danish Academy of Fine Arts between 1859 and 1865 where he studied under Johan Henrik Nebelong and Johan Daniel Herholdt, for both of whom he also worked. He was also influenced by Niels Laurits Høyen's lectures on art history which strengthened his interest in architectural history in general and historic Danish architecture in particular.

He ventured abroad on several occasions, including to East Prussia in 1862 and to Italy from 1870 to 1871, but he also travelled widely in Denmark, acquiring a deep knowledge of Danish architectural tradition.

== Restoration work ==
A significant part of Storck's work related to the renovation and extension of historic buildings. While he worked for Herholdt, he led the rebuilding of Herlufsholm School between 1867 and 1870. After both Niels Sigfred Nebelong and Julius Tholle died in 1871, Storck was charged with completing the renovation of Viborg Cathedral. The exterior had already been completed but Storck worked on the interior and designed furnishings for the building. This work brought him in contact with Jens Jacob Asmussen Worsaae who would influence his work in future restorations in several ways. Both Høyen and Worsaae were Danish proponents of the intervention theories of Eugène Viollet-le-Duc which in historic preservation calls for a "restoration" that creates something that never actually existed in the past, rather than a retention of status quo. Unlike Høyen, Worsaae found that later additions to a building could also be prone to preservation. Storck shared this view but only to the extent that the later elements were of high artistic value and did not hide the original qualities of the building.

He was active in the preservation of historic architecture, such as the House of the Holy Ghost in Randers and the Carmelite House when they were destined for demolition. He co-founded the Danish Society for the preservation of Old Buildings in 1907 and chaired it until 1911.

== Selected buildings ==
- Sophiendal Manor, Skanderborg (1876–79, extended in 1884)
- Abel Cathrines Stiftelse, Vesterbro, Copenhagen (188–86)
- Holy Cross Church, Nørrebro, Copenhagen (1890)
- Soldenfeldts Stiftelse, Copenhagen (1895)
- The Hirschsprung Collection, Copenhagen (1911)

=== Restorations ===
- Stubbekøbing Church, Stubbekøbing, Falster, Denmark (1881)
- Viborg Cathedral, Viborg (1871–76)
- Church of the Holy Ghost, Copenhagen (188–1880)
- Ledøje Church (1887–92)
- Bjernede Church (1890–92)
- Tower of Maribo Cathedral, Maribo, Lolland, Denmark (1891)
- Spire of St Olaf's Church, Helsingør, Denmark (1898)
- St. Bendt's Church, Ringsted (1899–1910)
- Carmelite Priory, Helsingør (1900–07)
- Stege Church, Stege, Møn, Denmark (1909)

== See also ==
- Architecture of Denmark

Cultural offices
Preceded by Carl Aarsleff	Director of the Royal Danish Academy of Fine Arts; 1917–1920	Succeeded by Joakim Skovgaard
