= 2025 Frederikshavn municipal election =

Municipal election in Denmark

- 18 November 2025

All 29 seats to the Frederikshavn municipal council 15 seats needed for a majority
- Turnout: 32,120 (67.5%) ▼0.6%
	First party	Second party	Third party
	V	A	F
Party	Venstre	Social Democrats	Green Left
Last election	6 seats, 21.0%	18 seats, 57.4%	1 seat, 3.9%
Seats won	9	8	5
Seat change	▲3	▼10	▲4
Popular vote	9,518	8,247	4,817
Percentage	30.2%	26.1%	15.3%
Swing	▲9.2%	▼31.3%	▲11.4%
	Fourth party	Fifth party	Sixth party
	Æ	C	O
Party	Denmark Democrats	Conservatives	Danish People's Party
Last election	Did not stand	2 seats, 7.0%	1 seat, 3.0%
Seats won	3	2	1
Seat change	▲3	0	0
Popular vote	3,161	1,787	1,665
Percentage	10.0%	5.7%	5.3%
Swing	New	▼1.3%	▲2.3%
	Seventh party
	I
Party	Liberal Alliance
Last election	Did not stand
Seats won	1
Seat change	▲1
Popular vote	954
Percentage	3.0%
Swing	New
Mayor before election
Karsten Thomsen
Social Democrats
Mayor after election
Jon Andersen
Venstre

The 2025 Frederikshavn Municipal election was held on November 18, 2025, to elect the 29 members to sit in the regional council for the Frederikshavn Municipal council, in the period of 2026 to 2029. The result saw significant gains for Venstre and Green Left, while the A had a significant drop in vote share, losing 10 seats. This would mark the first time since the structural reform in 2007, that the party was not the largest in the municipality. Eventually it was revealed that they would lose the mayoral position to Venstre.

== Background ==
The Social Democrats had held the mayor’s position in Frederikshavn since the 2013 election.

Birgit S. Hansen, the mayor of Frederikshavn since 2013, announced in October 2024, that she would step down on 31 October, and not seek re-election in 2025. According to TV2 Nord, this was likely linked to the scandals concerning Frederikshavn Havn which had played a large part during the terms of Hansen's administration. Karsten Thomsen, from the same party, took over the job on 31 October. However, Thomsen did not run mayor in 2025 and considered himself as an interim mayor. Instead Anders Brandt Sørensen, would the be the mayoral candidate for the Social Democrats.

== Electoral system ==
For elections to Danish municipalities, a number varying from 9 to 31 are chosen to be elected to the municipal council. The seats are then allocated using the D'Hondt method and a closed list proportional representation.

Frederikshavn Municipality had 29 seats in 2025

Unlike in Danish General Elections, in elections to municipal councils, electoral alliances are allowed.

== Electoral alliances ==
=== Electoral Alliance 1 ===
Party		Political alignment
C	Conservatives	Centre-right
I	Liberal Alliance	Centre-right to Right-wing
O	Danish People's Party	Right-wing to Far-right

=== Electoral Alliance 2 ===
Party		Political alignment
F	Green Left	Centre-left to Left-wing
Ø	Red-Green Alliance	Left-wing to Far-Left

=== Electoral Alliance 3 ===
Party		Political alignment
V	Venstre	Centre-right
Æ	Denmark Democrats	Right-wing to Far-right

== Results by polling station ==
Division	A	C	F	I	M	O	V	Æ	Ø
Division	%	%	%	%	%	%	%	%	%
Skagen	21.6	10.7	10.3	1.0	1.9	6.0	43.7	3.4	1.5
Ålbæk	37.9	6.7	8.3	1.7	1.5	4.6	29.6	8.4	1.3
Jerup	25.4	3.7	14.2	3.0	2.2	7.3	33.1	9.6	1.6
Elling	25.9	6.3	13.7	3.5	0.9	5.2	25.6	17.2	1.6
Strandby Borger- og Kulturhus	24.0	4.4	13.4	3.5	1.8	4.4	34.3	13.3	0.8
Frederikshavn (Arena Nord)	29.8	4.6	20.5	4.0	1.7	6.7	22.6	8.0	2.2
Ravnshøj	24.1	3.6	15.4	3.4	2.5	4.8	26.2	18.4	1.4
Gærum	25.6	3.9	11.8	4.5	2.9	4.3	32.9	12.9	1.0
Sæby	25.6	5.7	15.1	2.6	2.9	3.0	34.6	9.2	1.3
Dybvad	23.3	2.6	8.2	2.8	3.6	5.0	28.3	22.9	3.2
Hørby Sognehus	20.8	5.0	8.7	3.1	4.7	4.3	31.7	19.6	2.1
Thorshøj	23.9	4.2	7.9	2.5	7.6	4.2	23.1	23.7	2.8
Voerså	18.8	3.2	8.7	1.8	2.1	5.8	42.5	16.3	0.8
Volstrup	18.2	6.3	11.9	1.4	2.6	5.7	34.9	18.2	0.9
Østervrå	13.7	6.8	8.8	3.0	19.6	3.0	24.9	19.2	1.1

== Results ==
Party		Votes	%	+/-	Seats	+/-
Frederikshavn Municipality
V	Venstre	9,518	30.16	+9.19	9	+3
A	Social Democrats	8,247	26.13	-31.28	8	-10
F	Green Left	4,817	15.26	+11.36	5	+4
Æ	Denmark Democrats	3,161	10.02	New	3	New
C	Conservatives	1,787	5.66	-1.34	2	0
O	Danish People's Party	1,665	5.28	+2.25	1	0
I	Liberal Alliance	954	3.02	New	1	New
M	Moderates	889	2.82	New	0	New
Ø	Red-Green Alliance	522	1.65	-0.41	0	0
Total		31,560	100	N/A	29	N/A
Invalid votes		147	0.31	-0.08		
Blank votes		413	0.87	+0.42		
Turnout		32,120	67.49	-0.64		
Source: valg.dk

== Opinion polls ==
Polling firm	Fieldwork date	Sample size	A	V	C	F	O	Ø	I	M	Æ	Lead
Epinion	4 Sep - 13 Oct 2025	506	36.9	21.6	6.0	11.0	5.4	1.4	5.6	1.9	10.2	15.3
2024 european parliament election	9 Jun 2024		22.3	16.5	6.3	10.8	8.4	3.1	6.0	5.8	17.4	4.9
2022 general election	1 Nov 2022		39.5	12.5	3.7	4.0	2.6	1.7	5.8	6.1	17.0	22.5
2021 regional election	16 Nov 2021		44.8	19.8	16.4	2.8	4.0	2.8	0.5	–	–	25.0
2021 municipal election	16 Nov 2021		57.4 (18)	21.0 (6)	7.0 (2)	3.9 (1)	3.0 (1)	2.1 (0)	–	–	–	36.4
