= 2021 Frederikshavn municipal election =

← 2017	16 November 2021	2025 →

All 29 seats to the Frederikshavn Municipal Council 15 seats needed for a majority
- Turnout: 33,065 (68.1%) ▼3.4pp
	First party	Second party	Third party
	A	V	C
Party	Social Democrats	Venstre	Conservatives
Last election	18 seats, 59.7%	6 seats, 18.9%	1 seat, 3.2%
Seats won	18	6	2
Seat change	0	0	▲1
Popular vote	18,757	6,851	2,287
Percentage	57.4%	21.0%	7.0%
Swing	▼2.3%	▲2.1%	▲3.8%
	Fourth party	Fifth party	Sixth party
	D	F	O
Party	New Right	Green Left	Danish People's Party
Last election	0 seats, 1.4%	1 seat, 3.7%	2 seats, 8.2%
Seats won	1	1	1
Seat change	▲1	0	▼1
Popular vote	1,634	1,275	987
Percentage	5.0%	3.9%	3.0%
Swing	▲3.6%	▲0.2%	▼5.2%
	Seventh party
	Ø
Party	Red–Green Alliance
Last election	1 seat, 2.0%
Seats won	0
Seat change	▼1
Popular vote	680
Percentage	2.0%
Swing	▲0.1%
Mayor before election
Birgit Hansen
Social Democrats
Mayor after election
Birgit Hansen
Social Democrats

In 2014, following the 2013 Frederikshavn Municipal election, Birgit Hansen, member of Social Democrats (Denmark) became mayor of Frederikshavn Municipality, located in Northern Jutland. She was re-elected in 2017 with her party winning 18 seats, an increase of 4 seats from 2013. She stood to be elected mayor for a third time in 2021, and succeeded as the Social Democrats (Denmark) maintained its 18 seats, despite decreasing their vote share by 2.3%.

== Electoral system ==
For elections to Danish municipalities, a number varying from 9 to 31 are chosen to be elected to the municipal council. The seats are then allocated using the D'Hondt method and a closed list proportional representation. Frederikshavn Municipality had 29 seats in 2021

Unlike in Danish General Elections, in elections to municipal councils, electoral alliances are allowed.

== Electoral alliances ==
=== Electoral Alliance 1 ===
Party		Political alignment
F	Green Left	Centre-left to Left-wing
Ø	Red–Green Alliance	Left-wing to Far-Left

=== Electoral Alliance 2 ===
Party		Political alignment
K	Christian Democrats	Centre to Centre-right
V	Venstre	Centre-right

=== Electoral Alliance 3 ===
Party		Political alignment
C	Conservatives	Centre-right
D	New Right	Right-wing to Far-right
O	Danish People's Party	Right-wing to Far-right

== Results by polling station ==
Polling Station	A	C	D	F	K	O	V	Ø
Polling Station	%	%	%	%	%	%	%	%
Skagen	56.0	4.1	4.2	1.4	0.1	3.6	28.9	1.6
Hulsig	36.6	3.2	5.4	3.2	1.1	2.2	43.0	5.4
Ålbæk	56.7	11.8	3.1	2.5	0.4	3.3	19.1	3.1
Jerup	57.4	8.0	9.9	2.7	0.2	5.3	13.9	2.5
Elling	60.6	6.4	6.2	3.1	1.3	4.4	17.0	1.1
Strandby	51.4	7.8	4.9	3.3	5.4	2.9	22.6	1.5
Frederikshavn Nord	66.4	6.4	5.8	4.2	0.1	3.4	12.0	1.7
Frederikshavn Midt	64.6	6.8	5.7	5.8	0.3	2.9	11.2	2.8
Frederikshavn Syd	64.2	7.2	5.4	5.3	0.3	2.4	13.0	2.1
Ravnshøj	57.2	6.7	4.8	6.1	1.0	3.0	18.8	2.4
Gærum	51.9	11.1	6.5	3.1	0.2	2.2	23.4	1.5
Sæby	55.8	8.6	3.1	4.6	0.3	2.2	23.4	2.0
Brønden	43.4	4.8	8.5	2.6	1.8	3.3	31.6	4.0
Dybvad	49.0	3.3	6.1	3.8	0.5	5.0	30.1	2.2
Hørby	47.0	7.3	6.4	3.6	1.1	3.1	29.9	1.6
Præstbro	47.8	5.2	4.4	1.1	0.0	1.8	34.4	5.2
Thorshøj	49.0	7.1	4.4	1.7	1.5	4.6	29.8	2.0
Understed	42.1	5.8	7.8	3.5	0.9	2.3	34.6	3.2
Voerså	31.2	2.6	6.0	1.9	0.0	3.2	53.2	1.7
Volstrup	52.2	9.7	7.3	2.4	0.0	2.7	24.2	1.6
Østervrå	38.6	5.5	4.4	2.5	1.6	3.9	42.6	0.9
Lyngså	47.9	9.0	3.4	2.6	0.3	3.6	31.7	1.6

== Results ==
Party		Votes	%	+/-	Seats	+/-
Frederikshavn Municipality
A	Social Democrats	18,757	57.41	-2.25	18	0
V	Venstre	6,851	20.97	+2.09	6	0
C	Conservatives	2,287	7.00	+3.78	2	+1
D	New Right	1,634	5.00	+3.57	1	+1
F	Green Left	1,275	3.90	+0.21	1	0
O	Danish People's Party	987	3.02	-5.21	1	-1
Ø	Red-Green Alliance	674	2.06	+0.10	0	-1
K	Christian Democrats	205	0.63	+0.17	0	0
Total		32,670	100	N/A	29	N/A
Invalid votes		190	0.39	+0.21		
Blank votes		205	0.42	-0.10		
Turnout		33,065	68.13	-3.34		
Source: valg.dk
