= Sogard =

Sogard, also spelt Søgård or Søgaard, is a surname of Danish or Norwegian origin. Notable people with the surname include:

- Aage William Søgaard (1933–2010), Norwegian trade unionist and politician
- Alex Sogard (born 1987), American baseball coach and former player
- Allan Søgaard Larsen (born 1965), Danish businessman
- Allan Søgaard (born 1979), Danish footballer
- Eric Sogard (born 1986), American baseball player
- Espen Søgård (born 1979), Norwegian footballer
- Frederik Søgaard (born 1997), Danish badminton player
- Kim Søgaard (born 1964), former Norwegian ice hockey player
- Linea Søgaard-Lidell (born 1987), Danish politician
- Lotte Søgaard-Andersen (born 1959), Danish scientist
- Mads Søgaard (born 2000), Danish ice hockey player
- Michael Søgaard (born 1969), Danish badminton player
- Morten Søgård (born 1956), Norwegian curler
- Nick Sogard (born 1997), American baseball player
- Nina Munch-Søgaard (born 1987), retired Norwegian tennis player
- Runar Søgaard, Norwegian life coach
- Phil Sogard (1933–2023), American film and television director
- Poul Søgaard (1923–2016), Danish politician
