= Jakob Severin Deichmann Branth =

Danish theologian and lichenologist (1831–1917)

- Born: 7 December 1831; Nykøbing Mors, Denmark
- Died: 9 December 1917 (aged 86)
- Education: University of Copenhagen
- Scientific career
- Fields: Theology, lichenology
- Author abbrev. (botany): Branth

Jakob Severin Deichmann Branth (7 December 1831 – 9 December 1917) was a Danish theologian and lichenologist who made contributions to the field of lichenology while serving as a vicar. His work bridged the gap between religious life and scientific pursuits during a time of significant debate between theology and science.

== Early life and education ==
Born in 1831 in Nykøbing Mors, Denmark, Branth faced early adversity with the loss of his mother when he was two years old. Subsequently, he was raised by his uncle, R. S. Deichmann, a rural dean. Branth's formal education culminated in his graduation from secondary school in 1849, after which he enrolled at the University of Copenhagen to study theology.

During his university years, Branth formed a significant friendship with fellow student Otto Møller. Their relationship, which began in 1853, would last until shortly before Møller's death in 1915, documented through a correspondence of 242 letters. These letters provide insights into their personal lives, religious views, and scientific interests. It was also during this period that Branth developed an interest in botany, attending lectures on the subject alongside his theological studies.

== Career ==
Branth's professional life was marked by a blend of religious duties and scientific pursuits. He began his career as a private tutor from 1858 to 1861, followed by a stint as headmaster at the real school in Tønder. However, his position at Tønder was cut short by the German occupation of Schleswig in 1864, leading to a period of unemployment.

His religious career proper began in 1866 when he became an assistant vicar in Skælskør, Zealand. He then served as vicar at Elling in North Jutland from 1871 to 1880, and finally at Sneptrup in East Jutland from 1880 until his retirement in 1905.

Throughout his tenure as a vicar, Branth continued his scientific work. He authored a physics textbook that remained in use for 40 years. During his time in North Jutland, he developed an interest in geology, studying sand and clay layering in local pits and collaborating with an Oslo professor on the origins of ice-transported moraine-blocks in the region.

However, it was in lichenology that Branth made his most significant scientific contributions. He began publishing on lichens in 1860 and, in collaboration with Emil Rostrup, co-authored Lichenes Daniae eller Danmarks laver in 1869, the first Danish lichen flora. This work established Branth as a leading figure in Danish lichenology, a position he maintained for the remainder of the century. Branth specialised in lichen taxonomy, which influenced his critical stance on Darwin's theory.

== Personal life ==
Branth's personal life was marked by two marriages. He wed Sophie Dumreicher in 1862, a union that remained childless until they took in a foster daughter in 1872. Sophie, described as quiet and deeply religious, died shortly after their silver jubilee in 1887.

In 1889, at the age of 58, Branth married 25-year-old Emmy Boldsen, a decision that initially shocked his friend Møller. However, Branth asserted that the marriage was based on mutual love. The couple had seven children, with the last born in 1907 when Branth was 76 years old. While he cherished his family, the large household presented financial challenges, especially as he approached retirement.

== Scientific contributions and approach ==
Branth's scientific work was primarily focused on lichenology. His approach to taxonomy was characterised by a broad concept of species, which was evident in his work Lichenes Daniae. He maintained this view throughout his career, applying it to his studies of Arctic lichens from various regions including Greenland, Iceland, and the Faroe Islands.

In addition to lichenology, Branth made contributions to geology and other areas of botany. He studied the native pine forests of Læsø and investigated the flora of the ruined Koldinghus castle after his retirement.

Branth was critical of Darwin's theory, arguing that Darwinism had "confused and muddled" empirical scientific investigation. He claimed that Japetus Steenstrup was the only Danish naturalist who fully agreed with him on the species concept. Branth dismissed Darwin's achievements, viewing the theory as "all hypothesis and poverty of facts".

== Religious views and theological work ==
As a vicar, Branth was known for his eager preaching and serious interest in his congregation's religious life. He actively participated in public religious debates, often advocating for progressive ideas such as keeping Sundays free from duties. However, his strong personal opinions and sharp style sometimes led to friction within the church hierarchy.

Branth did not align himself with any particular theological school, preferring to maintain his independent thinking. This approach, combined with his scientific interests, sometimes put him at odds with more traditional clergy members.

== Views on science and religion ==
Branth's perspective on the relationship between science and religion was nuanced. He accepted the heliocentric model of Copernicus, seeing no conflict between it and Christian revelation. However, he rejected Darwin's theory of evolution, considering it speculative rather than empirically grounded. His discussions about Darwin with his friend Otto Møller focused more on cultural and value-based concerns rather than on issues of natural theology, design, providence, or chance.
