= List of shipwrecks in December 1839 =

The list of shipwrecks in December 1839 includes ships sunk, foundered, wrecked, grounded, or otherwise lost during December 1839.

== 1 December ==
List of shipwrecks: 1 December 1839
| Ship | State | Description |
|---|---|---|
| Hero | United Kingdom | The ship was wrecked near Dunbar, Lothian. Her crew were rescued. She was on a voyage from Great Yarmouth, Norfolk to Newcastle upon Tyne, Northumberland. |
| Minerva | (United Kingdom of Great Britain and Ireland) New South Wales | The whaler was driven onto the Mincing Ground, in Portland Bay and was wrecked. |
| Perzango | Spain | The ship was driven ashore at Coffie's Beach, New York, United States. She was on a voyage from Tenerife, Canary Islands to Boston, Massachusetts. Perzango became a wreck on 5 December. |
| Stranger | United Kingdom | The ship was driven ashore at Ramsgate, Kent. She was on a voyage from Boston, Lincolnshire to Ramsgate. Stranger was refloated and taken into Ramsgate. |

== 2 December ==
List of shipwrecks: 2 December 1839
| Ship | State | Description |
|---|---|---|
| Adolph | Sweden | The ship ran aground off "Woersaa", Denmark. She was on a voyage from Gothenburg to Bordeaux, Gironde, France. |
| Ellena | Portugal | The ship was driven ashore and wrecked on São Miguel Island, Azores. |
| Hebe | United Kingdom | The ship was driven ashore in the River Severn at Gloucester. She was on a voyage from Santander, Spain to Gloucester. |
| Hector | United Kingdom | The ship was abandoned in the North Sea off Flamborough Head, Yorkshire. Her crew were rescued by Queen Victoria (United Kingdom). Hector was on a voyage from "Holbeck" to Hull, Yorkshire. She was towed into Cley-next-the-Sea, Norfolk on 7 December. |
| Porto Formosa | Portugal | The schooner was driven ashore and sank at Vila Franca do Campo, São Miguel Island. Her crew were rescued. |
| Shelburne | United Kingdom | The ship was abandoned in the Atlantic Ocean. Her crew were rescued by Emporium (United States) and another vessel. Shelburne was on a voyage from Liverpool, Nova Scotia, British North America to Barbados. |
| Westmorland | United Kingdom | The ship was driven ashore in the River Severn at Gloucester. She was on a voyage from Saint John, New Brunswick, British North America to Gloucester. |

== 3 December ==
List of shipwrecks: 3 December 1839
| Ship | State | Description |
|---|---|---|
| Adams | United Kingdom | The ship was driven ashore in the Yangon River. She was on a voyage from Mauritius to Ceylon and Rangoon. |
| Betsey and Martha | United Kingdom | The ship was driven ashore near Porthdinllaen, Caernarfonshire. She was on a voyage from Portmadoc, Caernarfonshire to Dublin. Betsey and Martha was refloated on 10 December. |
| Clondolin | Portugal | The ship was driven ashore and wrecked 6 nautical miles (11 km) south of Figueira da Foz. Her crew were rescued. She was on a voyage from Newfoundland, British North America to Figueira da Foz. |
| Emma | United Kingdom | The ship was wrecked at Odesa. |
| Eruartung | Prussia | The ship was driven ashore on "Zurgst". She was on a voyage from and English port to Memel. |
| Goodluck | United Kingdom | The ship was severely damaged at Odesa. |
| Navigator | Stettin | The ship ran aground on the Lemon and Ore Sand, in the North Sea and sank. Her crew were rescued. She was on a voyage from Stettin to Liverpool, Lancashire, United Kingdom. |

== 4 December ==
List of shipwrecks: 4 December 1839
| Ship | State | Description |
|---|---|---|
| Amphitrite | United Kingdom | The ship ran aground at Swinemünde, Prussia. She was on a voyage from Swinemünde to Leith, Lothian. |
| Emma | United Kingdom | The ship was driven ashore in Table Bay. |
| Emu | United Kingdom | The ship was driven ashore at Green Point, Cape Town, Cape Colony. She was on a voyage from London to Hobart, Van Diemen's Land. Emu was refloated the next day. |
| Miller | United Kingdom | The ship was driven ashore in Loch Indaal. She was on a voyage from Glasgow, Renfrewshire to Londonderry. |
| Neptuna | Portugal | The ship foundered off Terceira Island, Azores. |

== 5 December ==
List of shipwrecks: 5 December 1839
| Ship | State | Description |
|---|---|---|
| Benjamin | France | The ship foundered off Algeciras, Spain. She was on a voyage from Marseille, Bouches-du-Rhône to Portrieux, Côtes du Nord. |
| Dart | United Kingdom | The ship capsized in the Atlantic Ocean off the Azores with the loss of a crew member. Survivors were rescued by Rose (United Kingdom). |
| Exquisite | United Kingdom | The ship ran aground at Grimsby, Lincolnshire. |
| Scotia | United Kingdom | The ship was abandoned in the Atlantic Ocean. All 24 people on board were rescued by Roscius (United Kingdom). Scotia was on a voyage from Quebec City, Lower Canada, British North America to Glasgow, Renfrewshire. |

== 6 December ==
List of shipwrecks: 6 December 1839
| Ship | State | Description |
|---|---|---|
| Branch | United Kingdom | The schooner was driven ashore at Boulmer, Northumberland. She was refloated and taken into South Shields, County Durham. |
| Edinburgh Castle | United Kingdom | The schooner was wrecked on the Seaton House Rock, Northumberland. |
| Iris | United Kingdom | The ship was severely damaged by ice at Swinemünde, Prussia.' |
| Jessey | United Kingdom | The schooner was driven ashore on the Druridge Sands, Northumberland. She was refloated. |
| Produce | United Kingdom | The ship was driven ashore at "Wittenbergen". She was on a voyage from Hamburg to Hull, Yorkshire. Produce was refloated on 14 December and towed back to Hamburg. |
| Rose | United Kingdom | The ship was driven ashore and wrecked at Islandmore, County Down. She was on a voyage from Ardrossan, Ayrshire to Limerick. Rose was refloated on 10 December. |

== 7 December ==
List of shipwrecks: 7 December 1839
| Ship | State | Description |
|---|---|---|
| Burtenwerp | Netherlands | The ship ran aground off "Hornbeck". She was on a voyage from Amsterdam, North Holland to Königsberg, Prussia. Burtenwerp was refloated on 9 December and taken into Helsingør, Denmark, where she sank. |
| Caroline | (United Kingdom of Great Britain and Ireland) New South Wales | The ship was wrecked on Swan Islands. All on board were rescued. |
| Countess of Airlie | United Kingdom | The ship ran aground on the Middle Ground, off the coast of Denmark, She was on a voyage from Riga, Russia to Montrose, Forfarshire. |
| Najadete | Netherlands | The ship was driven ashore and wrecked at Thisted, Denmark. She was on a voyage from Culemborg, Gelderland to an English port. |
| Permei | United Kingdom | The ship was driven ashore on the north east coast of Gozo, Malta. |
| Rosamund | United Kingdom | The ship was driven ashore on Stephen Point, Cornwall. She was refloated but consequently foundered. Rosamund was on a voyage from Plymouth, Devon to Padstow, Cornwall. |
| St. Vincent | France | The ship struck rocks and sank at St Martin's, Isles of Scilly, United Kingdom. She was on a voyage from Marans, Charente-Maritime to Penzance, Cornwall. |

== 8 December ==
List of shipwrecks: 8 December 1839
| Ship | State | Description |
|---|---|---|
| Cordelia | United Kingdom | The ship ran aground on a rock off Youghal, County Cork and was damaged. |
| Mary | United Kingdom | The ship foundered east of Santo Domingo. Her crew were rescued. She was on a voyage from British Honduras to Liverpool, Lancashire. |
| Mary Elizabeth | United Kingdom | The ship was driven ashore at Southwold, Suffolk. She was on a voyage from Goole, East Riding of Yorkshire to Southwold. |
| Norman | United Kingdom | The ship was destroyed by fire in the Atlantic Ocean. Her crew were rescued by Tasso (United Kingdom). Norman was on a voyage from Quebec City, Lower Canada, British North America to Swansea, Glamorgan. |
| Ocean | United Kingdom | The brig ran aground on the Nore. She was on a voyage from South Shields, County Durham to London. Ocean was refloated and resumed her voyage. |
| St. Andrew | United Kingdom | The ship was driven ashore at Odesa. Her crew were rescued. |
| St. George | United Kingdom | The ship foundered at Odesa. Her crew were rescued. |
| St. Michael | United Kingdom | The ship was driven ashore at Odesa. Her crew were rescued. |
| St. Nicholai | Russia | The ship was driven ashore at Odesa. Her crew were rescued. |
| Zeldenrust | Netherlands | The ship ran aground on the Portuguese Bank, in the North Sea. She was on a voyage from Liverpool to Zwolle, Overijssel. Zeldenrust was refloated on 12 December and taken into the Nieuw Diep. |

== 9 December ==
List of shipwrecks: 9 December 1839
| Ship | State | Description |
|---|---|---|
| Albion | United Kingdom | The ship was driven ashore and severely damaged at Seaton Delaval, County Durham. She was on a voyage from Wells-next-the-Sea, Norfolk to Stockton-on-Tees, County Durham. Albion was refloated on 16 December and taken into Hartlepool. |
| Arethusa | United States | The ship was driven ashore and wrecked at "Patcheauque", Long Island, New York with the loss of one life. Over 200 people were rescued. She was on a voyage from Liverpool, Lancashire, United Kingdom to New York City. |
| Bintenwerp | Netherlands | The ship sank at Helsingør, Denmark. She was on a voyage from Amsterdam, North Holland to Königsberg, Prussia. Bintenwerp was refloated on 24 December and beached. |
| Mary Charlotte Weber | France | The ship was damaged on a reef off Pernambuco, Brazil. She was on a voyage from Havre de Grâce, Seine Maritime to Mauritius. |
| Twee Gute Broders | Norway | The ship was driven ashore at Dimlington, Yorkshire, United Kingdom. She was on a voyage from Østerisør to "Halte". |

== 10 December ==
List of shipwrecks: 10 December 1839
| Ship | State | Description |
|---|---|---|
| Caroline | (United Kingdom of Great Britain and Ireland) New South Wales | The ship was wrecked on Swan Island, Van Diemen's Land. She was on a voyage from Hobart, Van Diemen's Land to Port Phillip. |
| Dryad | United Kingdom | The ship was wrecked on a reef 15 nautical miles (28 km) east of Cape Cruz, Cuba. Her crew were rescued. She was on a voyage from Liverpool, Lancashire to Santiago de Cuba, Cuba. |
| Lady Canmore | United Kingdom | The ship was driven ashore and damaged at Merrion, County Dublin. She was on a voyage from Ardrossan, Ayrshire to Waterford. Lady Canmore was refloated. |
| Minerva | United Kingdom | The ship ran aground at Sligo. She was on a voyage from Sligo to Sunderland, County Durham. |
| Oscar | Sweden | The ship was driven ashore and wrecked between Conil de la Frontera and Cape Trafalgar, Spain. She was on a voyage from Härnösand to Marseille, Bouches-du-Rhône, France. |

== 11 December ==
List of shipwrecks: 11 December 1839
| Ship | State | Description |
|---|---|---|
| Activ | Prussia | The ship was driven ashore at Holmen, Denmark. She was on a voyage from Pillau to Hull, Yorkshire, United Kingdom. |
| Marquess of Camden | United Kingdom | The ship was wrecked in the Spanish East Indies. Her crew were rescued by Asie (France). She was on a voyage from Singapore to China. |
| Odessa | Netherlands | The ship was wrecked on the Goodwin Sands, Kent, United Kingdom. Her crew were rescued. She was on a voyage from Amsterdam, North Holland to Africa. |
| Robert Gray | United Kingdom | The ship was driven ashore at Killia, Ottoman Empire. She had been refloated by 18 December. |
| Urania | United Kingdom | The ship ran aground at Sligo. |

== 12 December ==
List of shipwrecks: 12 December 1839
| Ship | State | Description |
|---|---|---|
| Cavalier | (United Kingdom of Great Britain and Ireland) British North America | The ship was driven ashore in the Mouse Islands. |
| Coventry | United Kingdom | The ship was abandoned in the Atlantic Ocean. Her crew were rescued by Newland (United Kingdom). Coventry was on a voyage from Quebec City, Lower Canada, British North America to Newcastle upon Tyne, Northumberland. |
| Diana | United Kingdom | The ship was wrecked on Jura. Her crew were rescued. |
| Emily | United Kingdom | The sloop was driven ashore and wrecked on the West Rocks, Harwich, Essex with the loss of all five people on board. She was on a voyage from Dunkirk, Nord, France to Woodbridge, Suffolk. |
| Falmouth Packet | United Kingdom | The ship was wrecked on the north coast of São Miguel Island, Azores with the loss of all bar her captain. She was on a voyage from Falmouth, Cornwall to São Miguel Islands. |
| George | United Kingdom | The ship ran aground on the Barnard Sand, in the North Sea off the coast of Norfolk. She was on a voyage from London to Gainsborough, Lincolnshire. George was refloated and taken into Great Yarmouth. |
| Jongfrue Karen | Norway | The ship was wrecked on the Pointe de la Coubre, Seine-Inférieure, France. Her crew were rescued. She was on a voyage from Bergen to Bordeaux, Gironde, France. |
| Lady Diana | United Kingdom | The smack was driven ashore and wrecked in the Small Isles of Jura. Her crew survived. |
| Nymph | United Kingdom | The ship ran aground at Teignmouth, Devon. She was on a voyage from Newcastle upon Tyne, Northumberland to Teignmouth. Nymph was refloated on 14 December and beached. |
| Tay | United Kingdom | The ship was driven ashore on the Isle of Arran. She was on a voyage from Chaleur Bay to Greenock, Renfrewshire. |
| Wemyss | United Kingdom | The ship ran aground and was wrecked on the Christchurch Ledge, in the English Channel off the coast of Dorset. Her crew were rescued. She was on a voyage from Ipswich, Suffolk to Plymouth, Devon. |

== 13 December ==
List of shipwrecks: 13 December 1839
| Ship | State | Description |
|---|---|---|
| Concordia | Denmark | The ship was wrecked on Læsø. Her crew were rescued. She was on a voyage from Copenhagen to Guernsey, Channel Islands. |
| Henry Davenport | United States | The ship was driven ashore on Hospital Island, Massachusetts. She was refloated on 20 December. |
| Sir William Wallace | United Kingdom | The whaler, a barque, was wrecked in Chowder Bay. |
| Tally Ho! | United Kingdom | The ship was driven ashore and wrecked near Cape Henry, Virginia, United States. Her crew were rescued. She was on a voyage from Virginia to Liverpool, Lancashire. |
| Vedra | United Kingdom | The ship ran aground on the Newcombe Sand, in the North Sea off the coast of Norfolk. She was later refloated. |
| William IV | United Kingdom | The ship was driven ashore and wrecked at Yarmouth, Nova Scotia, British North America. She was on a voyage from New York, United States to Halifax, Nova Scotia. |

== 14 December ==
List of shipwrecks: 14 December 1839
| Ship | State | Description |
|---|---|---|
| Emma | United Kingdom | The ship was driven ashore at Bideford, Devon. She was on a voyage from Faial Island, Azores to Bristol, Gloucestershire. Emma was refloated and resumed her voyage. |
| Enterprise | (United Kingdom of Great Britain and Ireland) Jersey | The schooner was driven ashore and wrecked at South Shields, County Durham. Her crew were rescued by Dennett's Apparatus. |
| Gipsey | (United Kingdom of Great Britain and Ireland) British North America | The ship was driven ashore in St. Mary's Bay, Nova Scotia. She was on a voyage from Antigua to Digby, Nova Scotia. Gipsey was refloated on 21 December. |
| Lady Wallace | United Kingdom | The ship was wrecked on the Crocodile Reef, 50 nautical miles (93 km) south of Tuticorin, India. Her crew were rescued. She was on a voyage from Singapore to Penang, then Colombo, Ceylon and Calcutta, India. |
| Mary and Jane | United Kingdom | The ship ran aground in the Swash. She was on a voyage from Dundalk, County Louth to Liverpool, Lancashire. |

== 15 December ==
List of shipwrecks: 15 December 1839
| Ship | State | Description |
|---|---|---|
| Edwin | United States | The ship was severely damaged in a gale while on a voyage from Boston, Massachusetts to Baltimore, Maryland. She was consequently condemned. |
| Mary Laing Meason | United Kingdom | The ship departed from South Shields, County Durham for Lerwick, Shetland Islands. No further trace, presumed foundered with the loss of all eight or ten people on board. |
| Pocohontas | United States | The ship was driven ashore on Plumb Island, Massachusetts with the loss of all hands. She was on a voyage from Cádiz, Spain to Newburyport, Massachusetts. |
| Selwin | United States | The ship was driven ashore at Boston, Massachusetts. She was on a voyage from Baltimore, Maryland to Pernambuco, Brazil. Selwin was consequently condemned. |

== 16 December ==
List of shipwrecks: 16 December 1839
| Ship | State | Description |
|---|---|---|
| Urania | Portugal | The ship ran aground off Dragør, Denmark. She was reported to be on a voyage from Lisbon to Fécamp, Seine-Inférieure, France. Uraniawas refloated and put into Copenhagen for repairs. |

== 17 December ==
List of shipwrecks: 17 December 1839
| Ship | State | Description |
|---|---|---|
| Avance | Prussia | The ship was wrecked on the Falsterbo Reef, in the Baltic Sea. She was on a voyage from Sunderland, County Durham to Swinemünde. |
| Emma | United Kingdom | The ship ran aground on the Droogden, off the coast of Denmark. She was on a voyage from Memel, Prussia to London. She was later refloated and resumed her voyage. |
| Hannah Kerr | United Kingdom | The ship was driven ashore and wrecked near Machias, Maine, United States. She was on a voyage from Liverpool, Lancashire to Saint John, New Brunswick. |
| Heath | United Kingdom | The ship was abandoned in the Irish Sea off the Tuskar Rock. Her crew were rescued. She was on a voyage from Liverpool, Lancashire to London. |
| H. Z. | Netherlands | The ship was wrecked at Plymouth, Devon, United Kingdom. She was on a voyage from Havana, Cuba to Amsterdam, North Holland. |
| Lively | United Kingdom | The ship was wrecked in the River Gwendraeth. Her crew were rescued She was on a voyage from Swansea to Llanelly, Glamorgan. Lively was refloated on 11 January 1840 and towed into Llanelly. |
| Mary Ann | United Kingdom | The ship was wrecked on the Teignmouth Rocks, Northumberland. |
| Pursuit | United Kingdom | The ship was driven ashore at Derbyhaven, Isle of Man. Her crew were rescued. She was on a voyage from Liverpool to the Shetland Islands. |
| William and Jane | United Kingdom | The ship was driven ashore at Aberavon, Glamorgan. She was on a voyage from Aberavon to Gloucester. |

== 18 December ==
List of shipwrecks: 18 December 1839
| Ship | State | Description |
|---|---|---|
| Bordeaux Packet | France | The ship capsized at Cuxhaven. |
| Ceres | United Kingdom | The ship was driven ashore at Killala, County Mayo. She was on a voyage from Ballina, County Mayp to Glasgow, Renfrewshire. Ceres was later refloated. |
| Concordia | Denmark | The brig was driven ashore and wrecked on the east coast of "Rossoe". Her crew were rescued. She was on a voyage from "Heimath" to Guernsey, Channel Islands. |
| Esther | United Kingdom | The ship ran aground on the Maplin Sand, in the North Sea off the coast of Essex. She was on a voyage from Stockton on Tees, County Durham to Chatham, Kent. Esther was refloated the next day and taken into Sheerness, Kent. |
| Lively | United Kingdom | The ship was wrecked on a sandbank in the Bristol Channel off the coast of Glamorgan. Her crew were rescued. She was on a voyage from Swansea to Llanelly. |

== 19 December ==
List of shipwrecks: 19 December 1839
| Ship | State | Description |
|---|---|---|
| Brilliant | United Kingdom | The paddle steamer was driven ashore and at Aberdeen with the loss of her captain. She was on a voyage from Leith, Lothian to Aberdeen. Brilliant subsequently caught fire and was destroyed. |
| Charlotte | United Kingdom | The Humber Keel sank at King's Lynn, Norfolk. |
| Friendship | United Kingdom | The ship struck rocks and sank at South Shields, County Durham. Her crew were rescuede. |
| Hannah | United Kingdom | The ship was driven ashore and wrecked 3 nautical miles (5.6 km) west of Dover, Kent. Her crew were rescued. |
| Mary | United Kingdom | The ship was driven ashore in Castle Chichester Bay. She was on a voyage from Bangor, Caernarfonshire to Belfast, County Antrim. |
| Palestine | United Kingdom | The ship ran aground on the Bull Sand, in the North Sea. She was on a voyage from South Shields, County Durham to London. Palestine was refloated and resumed her voyage. |
| Sackville | United Kingdom | The barque foundered in the Atlantic Ocean 25 nautical miles (46 km) north of the Isles of Scilly. All nineteen people on board were rescued by the brigantine L'Amelia (France). Sackville was on a voyage from an African port to Portsmouth, Hampshire. |
| Tiejo | Portugal | The ship was wrecked on Walney Island, Lancashire, United Kingdom. Her crew were rescued. She was on a voyage from Lisbon, Portugal to Liverpool, Lancashire. |
| Tilden | United Kingdom | The ship foundered in the North Sea off Great Yarmouth, Norfolk. |

== 20 December ==
List of shipwrecks: 20 December 1839
| Ship | State | Description |
|---|---|---|
| Caroline | (United Kingdom of Great Britain and Ireland) Van Diemen's Land | The ship ran aground on a reef in Bank's Straits. She was later refloated. |
| Don Giovanni | Flag unknown | The ship was driven ashore at Twielenfleth, Kingdom of Hanover. |
| Emily | United Kingdom | The ship was wrecked on the West Rocks, Harwich, Essex. She was on a voyage from Dunkirk, Nord, France to Woodbridge, Suffolk. |
| Favoran | Hamburg | The ship was driven ashore at Neumuhlen. She was on a voyage from Hamburg to London, United Kingdom. |
| Friendship | United Kingdom | The ship was driven ashore and wrecked at Tynemouth Castle, Northumberland. Her crew were rescued. |
| Heber | United Kingdom | The ship was driven ashore on "Bintang", Spanish East Indies. She was on a voyage from Singapore to London. |
| Henry Devonport | United States | The ship was beached at Boston, Massachusetts. |
| Neptunus | Netherlands | The ship ran aground on the Zuiderhaaks, in the North Sea off thecoast of Zeeland. She was on a voyage from Batavia Netherlands East Indies to Amsterdam, North Holland. Neptunus was refloated and taken into the Nieuw Diep. |
| Superior | United Kingdom | The ship ran aground in Lough Foyle. She was on a voyage from Riga, Russia to Londonderry. Superior was refloated on 27 December and taken into Londonderry. |
| Thames | United Kingdom | The ship capsized in the North Sea with the loss of all but two of her crew. Survivors were rescued by a Prussian vessel. She was on a voyage from Memel, Prussia to Hartlepool, County Durham. |
| Thomas Gilstone | United Kingdom | The ship was wrecked on Indian Key, Florida Territory with the loss of all but two of her crew. She was on a voyage from Belfast, County Antrim to New York, United States. |
| True Bess | United Kingdom | The ship was driven ashore and severely damaged at Kingswear Castle, Devon. She was on a voyage from Limerick to Portsmouth, Hampshire. True Bess was refloated but consequently had to be beached at Dartmouth, Devon. |

== 21 December ==
List of shipwrecks: 21 December 1839
| Ship | State | Description |
|---|---|---|
| Annetta Elizabeth | Denmark | The ship ran aground and was wrecked at Irvine, Ayrshire, United Kingdom. She was on a voyage from Copenhagen to Glasgow, Renfrewshire, United Kingdom. |
| Caroline | Russia | The ship ran aground on the Flemish Banks, in the North Sea. She was on a voyage from Saint Petersburg to Porto, Portugal. |
| Europe | United Kingdom | The ship was driven ashore at New Orleans, Louisiana. She was on a voyage from New Orleans to Liverpool, Lancashire. |
| True Bess | United Kingdom | The ship was driven onto rocks at Kingswear Castle, Devon. She was on a voyage from Limerick to Portsmouth, Hampshire. True Bess was refloated and taken into Dartmouth, Devon, where she was beached. |

== 22 December ==
List of shipwrecks: 22 December 1839
| Ship | State | Description |
|---|---|---|
| Britomart | United Kingdom | The barque was wrecked on Goose Island, Van Diemen's Land. She was on a voyage from Port Phillip, South Australia to Hobart, Van Diemen's Land. |
| Concord | United States | The ship was driven ashore and wrecked at Chincoteague, Virginia. Her crew were rescued. She was on a voyage from Jamaica to New York. |
| Crown | United Kingdom | The ship was wrecked on the Mouse Sand, in the North Sea off the coast of Essex. Her crew were rescued. |
| Diana | Belgium | The ship was driven ashore at Saltfleet, Lincolnshire, United Kingdom. She was on a voyage from Hull, Yorkshire to Antwerp. |
| Magic | United Kingdom | The ship was driven ashore on Ber Point, Cornwall. She was on a voyage from St. Ives, Cornwall to Naples, Kingdom of the Two Sicilies. Magic was refloated the next day. |
| Swift | United Kingdom | The ship struck the pier at Donaghadee, County Antrim and was beached. She was on a voyage from Sligo to Liverpool, Lancashire. |
| Union | United Kingdom | The ship was driven ashore and wrecked at the mouth of the River Gwendraeth. Her crew were rescued. She was on a voyage from Newport, Monmouthshire to Carmarthen. |

== 23 December ==
List of shipwrecks: 23 December 1839
| Ship | State | Description |
|---|---|---|
| Comet | United Kingdom | The ship was driven ashore at Redcar, Yorkshire. She was on a voyage from London to Stockton-on-Tees, County Durham. Comet was later refloated and resumed her voyage. |
| Emelie | Netherlands | The ship was driven ashore at "Basloe". She was later refloated and taken into Svelvik, Norway. |
| Industrious | United Kingdom | The ship ran aground on the Spaniard Sand, in the North Sea off the coast of Kent and sank. She was refloated and towed into Whitstable, Kent. |
| Water Witch | (United Kingdom of Great Britain and Ireland) New South Wales | The cutter was wrecked at Port Macquarie. She was on a voyage from Port Macquarie to Sydney. |

== 24 December ==
List of shipwrecks: 24 December 1839
| Ship | State | Description |
|---|---|---|
| Anchor | United Kingdom | The ship ran aground on the Gunfleet Sand, in the North Sea off the coast of Essex. She was on a voyage from Goole, Yorkshire to London. Anchor was refloated and resumed her voyage. |
| Belt | Flag unknown | The ship was abandoned in the Atlantic Ocean. Her crew were rescued by New Hampshire (United States). |
| Charlotte | United Kingdom | The ship was wrecked on the Kentish Knock. Her crew were rescued by the samck Mary (United Kingdom). Charlotte was on a voyage from Stockton-on-Tees, County Durham to Exeter, Devon. |
| Crown | United Kingdom | The ship was wrecked on the Mouse Sand, in the North Sea off the coast of Essex. Her crew were rescued. |
| Eleanor Sophia | United Kingdom | The ship was driven ashore at Tenby, Pembrokeshire. She was on a voyage from Rio de Janeiro, Brazil to Falmouth, Cornwall. Eleanor Sophia was refloated and taken into Tenby. |
| Ernest | France | The ship was driven ashore and wrecked at Audierne, Finistère, France with the loss of all hands. |
| Letitia | United Kingdom | The ship was driven ashore and wrecked at Logan Head, Wigtownshire with the loss of all but one of her crew. She was on a voyage from Carrickfergus, County Antrim to Carlisle, Cumberland. |
| Nightingale | (United Kingdom of Great Britain and Ireland) British North America | The ship was driven ashore in the Gut of Canso. She was on a voyage from Halifax, Nova Scotia to Prince Edward Island. |

== 25 December ==
List of shipwrecks: 25 December 1839
| Ship | State | Description |
|---|---|---|
| Hope | United Kingdom | The ship was driven ashore and damaged at Leith, Lothian. She was refloated on 27 December and taken into Leith. |
| Isabella and Ann | United Kingdom | The brig was driven ashore at the mouth of the River Tay. All thirteen crew people on board were rescued by the St Andrews Lifeboat. Isabella was on a voyage from South Shields, County Durham to Dundee, Forfarshire. |
| Jemima Sophia | United Kingdom | The ship capsized in the Atlantic Ocean with the loss of three of her crew. Survivors were rescued on 5 January 1840 by John and Mary (United Kingdom). Jemima Sophia was on a voyage from Quebec City, Lower Canada, British North America to London. |
| Levant | United Kingdom | The ship struck a rock and was beached at Cephalonia, United States of the Ionian Islands. Her crew were rescued. She was on a voyage from Zante to Cephalonia. Levant was consequently condemned. |
| Pelorus | (United Kingdom of Great Britain and Ireland) Singapore | The brig-sloop struck a shoal off the coast of Borneo (8°08′30″N 115°30′00″E) and sank. There were 22 survivors. |
| Rosario | Spain | The polacca was driven ashore and wrecked in the Mississippi River downstream of New Orleans, Louisiana, United States. |
| Samuel and Mary | United Kingdom | The ship sank at Ross, County Wexford. |
| Venus | United Kingdom | The ship ran aground and sank at Maryport, Cumberland. |

== 26 December ==
List of shipwrecks: 26 December 1839
| Ship | State | Description |
|---|---|---|
| Baltic Merchant | United Kingdom | The ship ran aground on the Gunfleet Sand, in the North Sea off the coast of Essex and was damaged. She was on a voyage from Newcastle upon Tyne, Northumberland to London. Baltic Merchant was refloated and resumed her voyage. |
| Loyalist | (United Kingdom of Great Britain and Ireland) British North America | The ship was driven ashore and wrecked on Brier Island, Nova Scotia. She was on a voyage from Saint Andrews, New Brunswick to Saint Vincent. |
| Scheldt | Netherlands | The ship ran aground on a shoal in English Bay, Ascension Island and sank. Her crew were rescued. She was on a voyage from Batavia, Netherlands East Indies to a Dutch port. |

== 27 December ==
List of shipwrecks: 27 December 1839
| Ship | State | Description |
|---|---|---|
| Albion | United Kingdom | The ship was driven ashore at Goswick, Northumberland. She was refloated in late January 1840 and taken into Berwick upon Tweed. |
| Atrevido | Portugal | The ship was wrecked off Vigo, Spain with the loss of a crew member. She was on a voyage from Porto to Liverpool, Lancashire, United Kingdom. |
| Blanche | United Kingdom | The ship was beached at Kingstown, County Dublin. She was on a voyage from Dublin to Southampton, Hampshire. |
| Hester | United Kingdom | The brig was abandoned in the Atlantic Ocean off the American coast. Her crew were rescued by Splendid (United States). |

== 28 December ==
List of shipwrecks: 28 December 1839
| Ship | State | Description |
|---|---|---|
| Hero | United Kingdom | The ship was driven ashore at Workington, Cumberland. |
| John | United Kingdom | The ship sank at Unst, Shetland Islands. Her crew were rescued. She was on a voyage from London to Riga, Russia. |
| Matchless | United States | The ship was driven ashore at Portland, Maine. She was refloated in late January 1840 and taken into Portland. |
| Transport | United States | The schooner capsized. Crew saved. |

== 29 December ==
List of shipwrecks: 29 December 1839
| Ship | State | Description |
|---|---|---|
| Anchor | United Kingdom | The ship ran aground on the Gunfleet Sand, in the North Sea off the coast of Essex. She was on a voyage from Goole, Yorkshire to London. Anchor was later refloated. |
| Aurelia | United Kingdom | The ship was driven ashore at Dundee, Forfarshire. She was on a voyage from Alloa, Clackmannanshire to Dundee. Aurelia was later refloated. |
| Evander | United Kingdom | The brig was driven ashore at Ballyferris Point, County Down. She was on a voyage from Riga, Russia to Belfast, County Antrim. |
| North Briton | United Kingdom | The ship ran aground on the Goodwin Sands, Kent. She was on a voyage from Leithm Lothian to Sydney, New South Wales, North Britain was later refloated and take inth The Downs. |
| Venerable | United Kingdom | The barque was in collision with London Merchant (United Kingdom) and sank off the Sunk Lightship ( Trinity House) with the loss of three of her crew. She was on a voyage from South Shields, County Durham to London. |

== 30 December ==
List of shipwrecks: 30 December 1839
| Ship | State | Description |
|---|---|---|
| Ariadne | United Kingdom | The ship ran aground on the Beacon Rock. She was refloated and taken into Dundee, Forfarshire. |
| Ino | United Kingdom | The ship sank at Uist, Outer Hebrides. Her crew were rescued. She was on a voyage from London to Riga, Russia. |
| Heemskerk | Netherlands | The ship ran aground at Amsterdam, North Holland. She was on a voyage from Amsterdam to Batavia, Netherlands East Indies. Heemskerk had become a wreck by 4 February 1840. |
| Swan | United Kingdom | The ship ran aground near the Rock Lighthouse. She was on a voyage from Glasgow, Renfrewshire to Liverpool, Lancashire. |

== 31 December ==
List of shipwrecks: 31 December 1839
| Ship | State | Description |
|---|---|---|
| Alcide | France | The brig was wrecked on the Bahamas Banks. She was on a voyage from Havana, Cuba to Bordeaux, Gironde. |
| Amphitrite | United Kingdom | The ship was driven ashore and wrecked at Flamborough Head, Yorkshire. Her crew were rescued. |
| Atalanta | United Kingdom | The smack sprang a leak and was abandoned off the Isle of Arran, Inner Hebrides. Her crew survived. She was on a voyage from Ayr to Dundalk, County Louth. |
| Dantsic Packet | United Kingdom | The ship was driven ashore at Neufahrwasser. She was on a voyage from Danzig to Liverpool, Lancashire. Dantsic Packet was refloated on 2 January 1840. |
| Louise | United Kingdom | The ship was driven ashore on Unst, Shetland Islands or Uist, Outer Hebrides. She was on a voyage from Riga, Russia to Londonderry. Louise was later refloated and put into Limerick in a leaky condition. |

== Unknown date ==
List of shipwrecks: Unknown date in December 1839
| Ship | State | Description |
|---|---|---|
| Active | United Kingdom | The ship was wrecked at Holmen, Denmark. She was on a voyage from Pillau, Prussia to Hull, Yorkshire. |
| Ann Elizabeth | Denmark | The ship was driven ashore and wrecked at Irvine, Ayrshire, United Kingdom. She was on a voyage from Copenhagen to Glasgow, Renfrewshire, United Kingdom. |
| Emma | France | The fishing smack was run down and sunk in the English Channel by Ocean (United States) with the loss of 23 of her 28 crew. |
| Eos | United Kingdom | The ship was driven ashore and wrecked on Zea, Greece before 9 December. She was on a voyage from Gloucester to Odesa. |
| Europa | Norway | The brig was in collision with Gotheborga Walgary ( Sweden) before 10 December and was abandoned in the North Sea with the loss of all but two of her crew. Survivors were rescued by Gotheborga Walgary. Europa was on a voyage from Hull to Laurvig. She came ashore at Frøya and was wrecked. |
| Fanny | United Kingdom | The ship sprang a leak and was beached on Bardsey Island, Pembrokeshire. She was on a voyage from Liverpool, Lancashire to Antwerp, Belgium. |
| Five Friends | United Kingdom | The coaster foundered off Burray, Orkney Islands on or before 2 December. |
| Florenz | Grand Duchy of Tuscany | The ship was lost in the Gulf of Genoa before 27 December with the loss of all hands. She was on a voyage from Amsterdam, North Holland, Netherlands to Genoa, Kingdom of Sardinia and Livorno. |
| Garland | United Kingdom | The ship ran aground on the Andrews Shoal, in the North Sea off Felixtowe, Suffolk and was abandoned by her crew. She was on a voyage from Newcastle upon Tyne, Northumberland to London. Garland was refloated on 31 December and taken into Harwich, Essex. |
| Hannah | United Kingdom | The ship was driven ashore and wrecked near Machias, Maine, United States before 16 December. She was on a voyage from Liverpool to Saint John, New Brunswick, British North America. |
| Hector | Hamburg | The galiot was abandoned in the North Sea before 6 December. She was towed into Blakeney, Norfolk United Kingdom. |
| Henrietta | United Kingdom | The schooner foundered in the Atlantic Ocean. Her crew were rescued by Pollock (United Kingdom). |
| Mary Ann | United States | The ship was abandoned in the Atlantic Ocean. Her crew were rescued by Byron (United Kingdom). Mary Ann was on a voyage from Prince Edward Island to Bedford, Massachusetts. |
| Neptunus | Russia | The ship was wrecked near Eckerö, Grand Duchy of Finland. She was on a voyage from Newcastle upon Tyne to Saint Petersburg. |
| Naylor | United Kingdom | The ship was driven ashore at "Schulan". She was on a voyage from Hamburg to London. Naylor was refloated on 21 December and resumed her voyage. |
| Pomona | United Kingdom | The ship was driven ashore at Pill, Glamorgan. She was refloated on 7 December and sailed for Cardiff, Glamorgan. |
| Tory | United Kingdom | The ship was driven ashore at the mouth of the Kaipara River, New Zealand. She was later refloated and put into Sydney, New South Wales for repairs. |
| Velvet | United Kingdom | The ship was driven ashore at the entrance to the Bosphorus. |
| William and Anne | United Kingdom | The ship ran aground off the coast of Essex. She was on a voyage from Newcastle upon Tyne, Northumberland to London. William and Anne was later refloated. |
