= Port of Skagen =

Danish port

Coordinates: 57°43.0′N 10°35.5′E

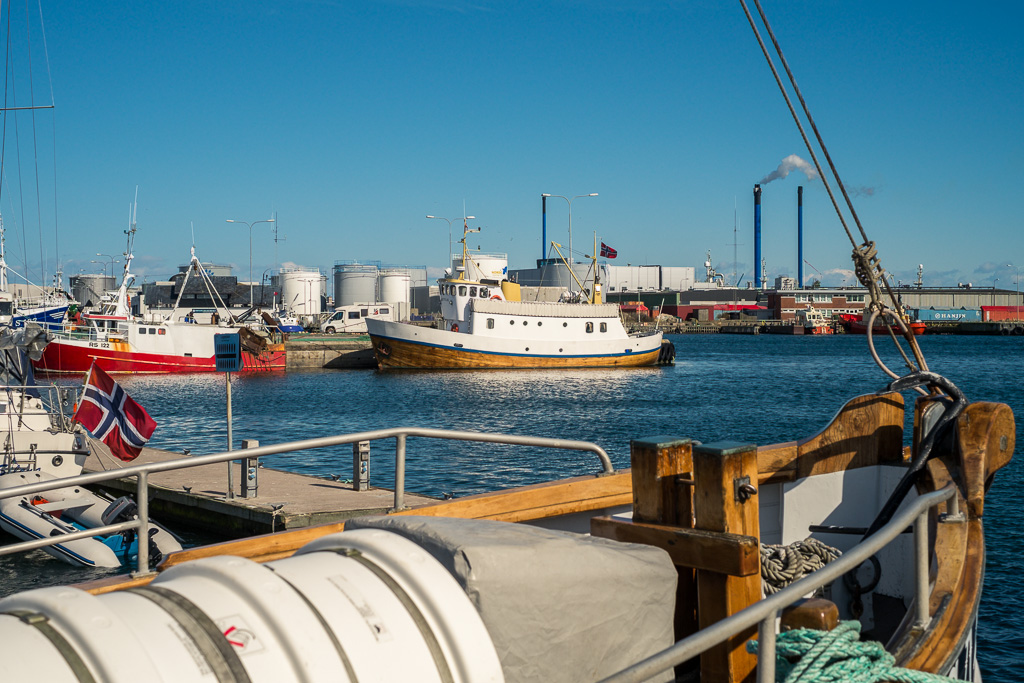
Port of Skagen

The Port of Skagen, also Skagen Harbour, (Danish: Skagen Havn) is located in Skagen, northern Denmark. The country's leading fishing port consists of an industrial harbour that supports the area's fishing industry as well as facilities for cruise ships. It also has a shipyard and fish-processing facilities. The harbour's marina is open to visitors during the summer months.

The fishing harbour was built between 1904 and 1907, with inner and outer sections established under the supervision of hydraulic engineer Palle Bruun. The official inauguration was on 20 November 1907. The distinctive warehouses next to the harbour were designed by Thorvald Bindesbøll, and opened in May 1908. In 1932, on the occasion of the harbour's 25th anniversary, Anne Marie Carl-Nielsen's statue of the fisherman and lifeboatman was unveiled. The harbour was expanded to the east between 1935 and 1938, and in the 1950s an 11 million krone (kr) expansion took place to the west, increasing the off-shore area by 70,000 square metres (750,000 sq ft) and the on-shore area by 90,000 square metres (970,000 sq ft). Between 1964 and 1979 the harbour was further expanded towards the east in a 35 million kr project to facilitate growth at the port, doubling the size of the harbour and providing new facilities for auctioning the catches from the 400 fishing boats registered in Skagen.

The Skagen Port Authority is responsible for the harbour's administration. FF Skagen, one of three companies supporting the Danish fish meal industry, has its processing plant on Skagen wharf. The harbour is being adapted to accommodate large international cruise ships. A new 450 m (1,480 ft) berth to be completed by 2015 will also provide facilities for oil bunkering and enhanced facilities for the fishing industry.

== Description ==
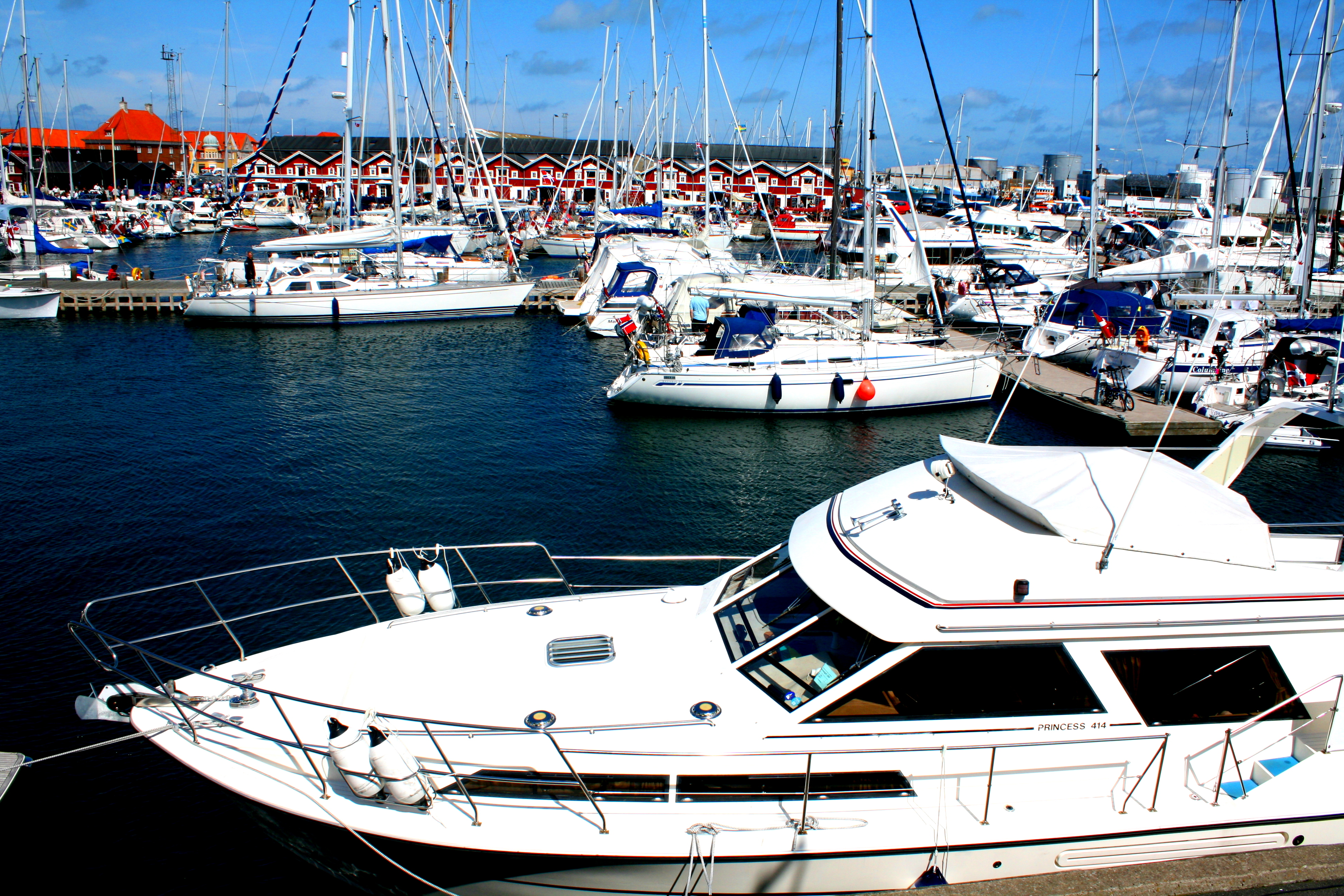
Skagen Lystbådehavn (Marina)

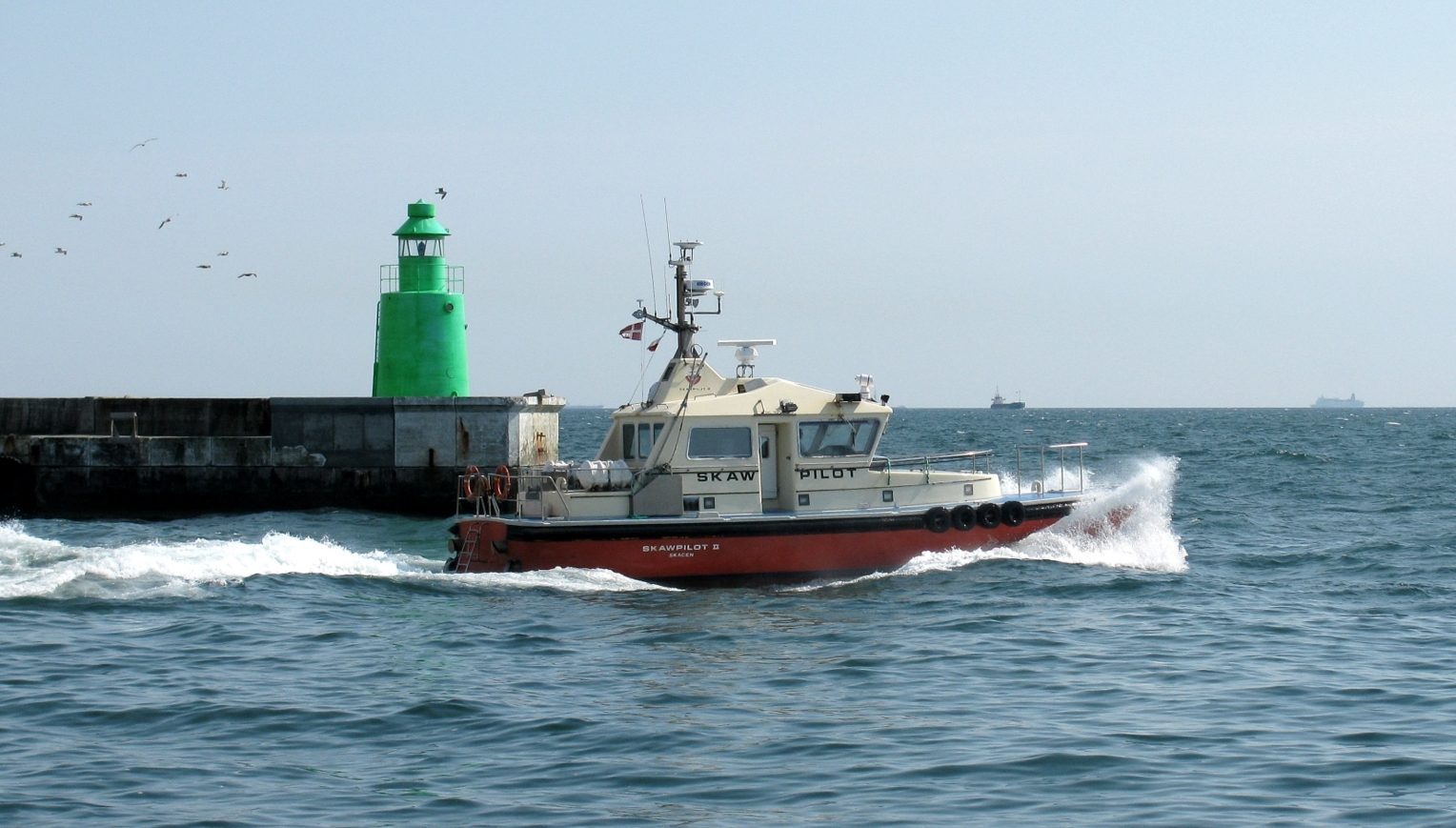
Skagen harbour entrance light

The Port of Skagen is situated in Ålbæk Bugt (Ålbæk Bay). The harbour covers a total area of 1,015,000 m^{2} (10,930,000 sq ft), consisting of 645,000 m^{2} (6,940,000 sq ft) of land and 370,000 m^{2} (4,000,000 sq ft) of water. The quays and moorings have a total length of 5.5 km (3.4 mi), of which 970 m (3,180 ft) have a depth of 9 m (30 ft). The harbour consists of three main basins (docks with water levels controlled by flood gates): Ydre Forhavnsbassin, Vesthavn and Østhavn. The Vesthavn consists of Indre Forhavnsbassin, Bundgarnsbassin, Auktionsbassin, Mellembassin and Vestre Bassin, while the Østhavn consists of Østbassin I and Østbassin II. Skagen Lystbådehavn (Skagen's pleasure boat harbour) administers the area between Gamle Pier and Pier 2 in the Mellembassin.

The harbour can accommodate ships up to 130 metres (430 ft) long and 20 metres (66 ft) wide with a draft of 7 metres (23 ft). Ships less than 90 metres (300 ft) long can moor at Quay 4 with a draft of 9 metres (30 ft). The largest vessel to have visited Skagen Harbour is the cruise ship Silver Cloud with a length of 156 metres (512 ft), which moored on Quay 4 in 2010 and 2011. The Lystbådehavn (marina) between Piers 1 and 2 is open to visiting pleasure boats from 1 April to 30 September. While the Port of Skagen supervises the marina during the summer months, the facilities are used for berthing fishing boats in the off-season. Frederikshavn Municipality is the official administrator. Facilities on Pier 1 include a diesel fuelling station at the end the pier and a barbecue. There is also a service building with toilets, showers, washing machines and dryers. Wifi internet access is available throughout the marina.

== History ==
=== Early history and background ===
After years of discussion between Skagen's fishermen and the authorities, a commission was finally established in the 1880s, leading to an early proposal for a harbour by Customs Inspector Holm that was not accepted. Under pressure from the fishermen, the Minister of the Interior called on an engineer by the name of Berg to prepare a new proposal in 1888. This led to parliamentary approval on 23 April 1903, followed by a call for tenders on 26 January 1904. On the basis of a bid from Gunnarson & Søn og Elzelingen, work was initiated in February 1904 on Skagen's Sønderstand (south shore) just outside the town. The work was supervised by the hydraulic engineer Palle Bruun who had reported on harbours in the Faroe Islands.

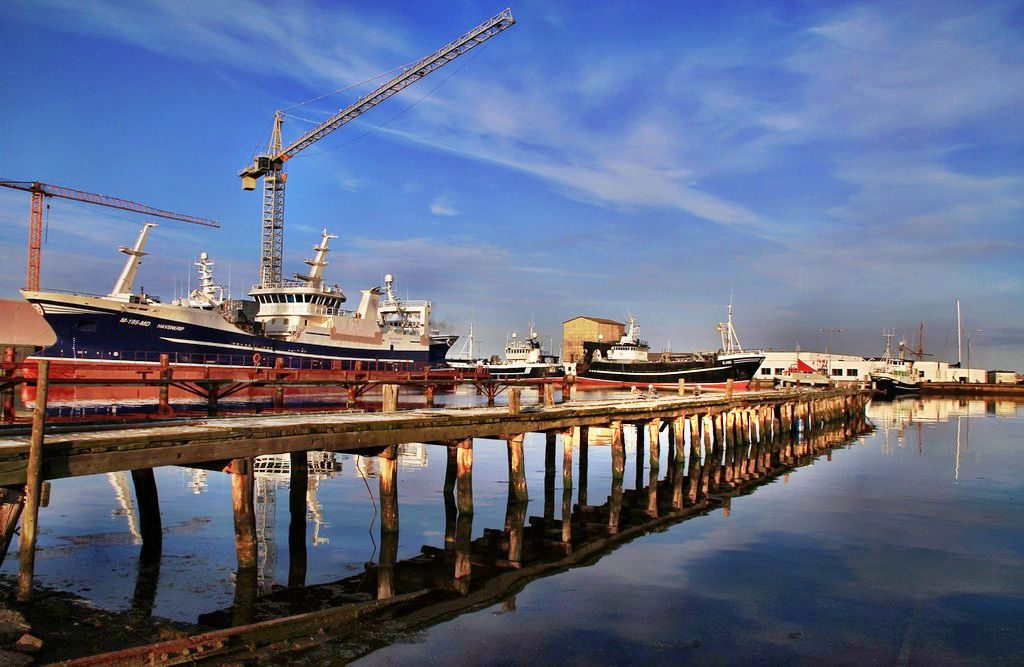
Skagen wharf

The design consisted of two breakwaters some 500 m (1,600 ft) apart that stretched out to sea. With their outer extensions providing an entrance some 60 m (200 ft) wide, the harbour covered an area of almost 160,000 m^{2} (1,700,000 sq ft). The basin was divided by two cross piers, creating an outer harbour and an inner harbour with an entrance 40 m (130 ft) wide. A harbour-master's house, fish warehouse and a customs office were built in parallel. On 19 November 1907, King Frederik VIII ceremonially opened the port in the presence of the Skagen Painters, who had decorated the facilities with flags. Carl Locher had designed an impressive gateway of honour.

In May 1908, four fish warehouses on the quayside designed by Thorvald Bindesbøll were opened. In 1932, on the occasion of the harbour's 25th anniversary, Anne Marie Carl-Nielsen's statue of the fisherman and lifeboatman was unveiled. In 1935, Johannes Friis-Skotte, Minister for Transport, announced that the government were funding a 900,000 kr project to expand the harbour towards the east, involving a 100 metres (330 ft) by 200 metres (660 ft) basin with a depth of 4.5 metres (15 ft), designed to facilitate fisherman during the process of unloading. As a result, between 1935 and 1938 the harbour was expanded towards the east, and a new auction room was added in 1938, 100 metres (330 ft) in length and 12 metres (39 ft) wide, with skylights and seven phone booths.

=== Post-war developments ===
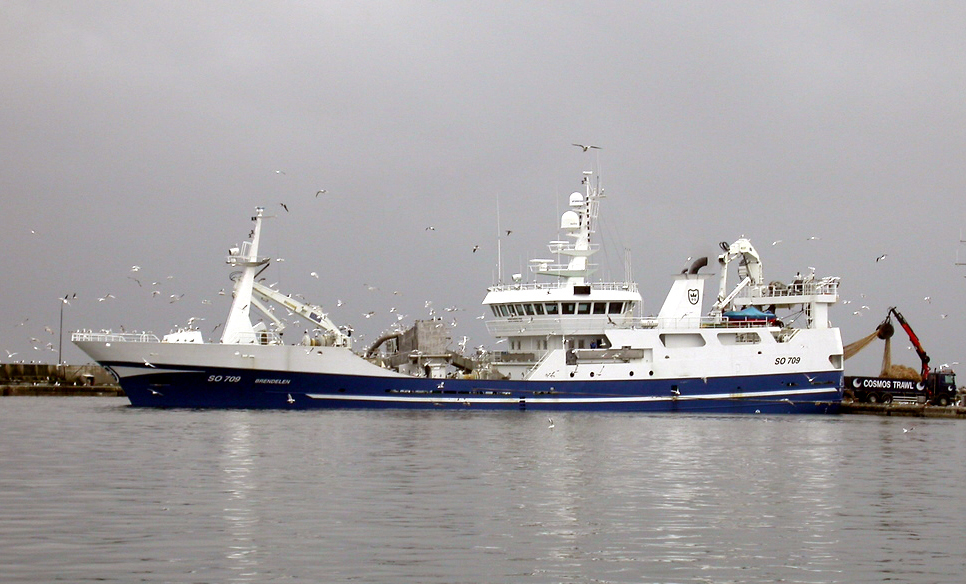
A trawler in Skagen harbour

In 1943, the Rigsdag approved 7 million kr proposals to further expand the harbour towards the west. However, due to the German occupation during the war the project was postponed and it wasn't until 1952 that construction began, rising to a budget of 11 million kr. The off-shore area of the port was expanded by 70,000 square metres (750,000 sq ft) and the on-shore area was enlarged by 90,000 square metres (970,000 sq ft), with some 12 metres (39 ft) of quay. Between 1964 and 1979, the harbour was further expanded towards the east in a 35 million kr project to facilitate growth at the port, doubling the size of the harbour and providing new facilities for auctioning the catches from the 400 fishing boats registered in Skagen. The off-shore area was enlarged by 14 hectares and the on-shore area with 120 hectares. A new auction room was erected between the fisheries inspection building and the auction office. In 1985, the Auktionsbassin (the Auction Basin) of the port was deepened by some 7 metres (23 ft), as was the Vesthavnen (West Harbour) in the early 1990s.

In 2001, the Port of Skagen acquired autonomously governed harbour status, after the government sold off several of the national harbours. Under ownership of the municipality, a 12.5 million kr investment was put into deepening the Østbassin 2 (East Basin 2) and building a new 300 metres (980 ft) quay to a depth of 9 metres (30 ft) in its outer part. In 2007, a new dry dock measuring 135 m (443 ft) by 25 m (82 ft) was built for Karstensen's wharf. Additional facilities for fish processing, including a refrigeration plant, were completed in 2008.

== Fishing ==
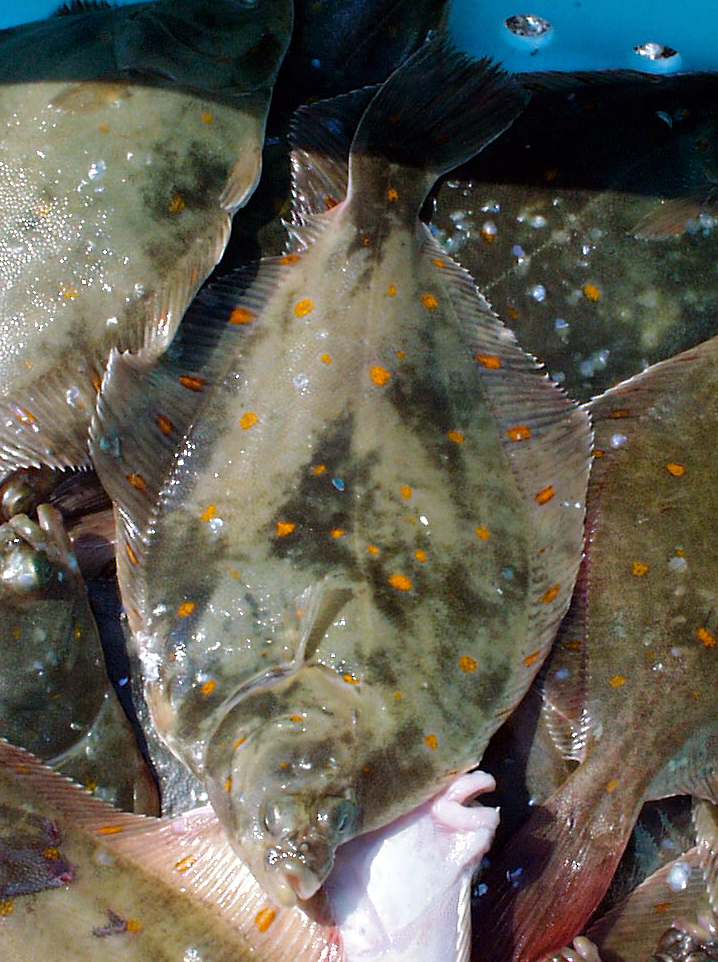
Plaice caught at Skagen

The Port of Skagen is Denmark's largest fishing port and the first in Europe for landings of pelagic fish, primarily herring. Founded in 1960, FF Skagen is one of three companies supporting the Danish fish-meal industry; its processing plant is located on Skagen wharf. As of 2011, statistics from the Danish Fisheries Directorate list Skagen Harbour as the leading fishing port in Denmark in terms of both the quantity of catches and their value. Statistics for 2013 from NaturErhvervstyrelsen showed a year-on-year increase in fishing takings of 10 percent for a total value of DKK 3.4 billion (c. US $621 million). Harbour director Willy Bent Hansen reported that the Port of Skagen now represented over 25 percent of all fish landed in Denmark.

In April 2014, the 86-meter-long supertrawler "Gitte Henning" landed a record 3,281 tons of whiting in Skagen after returning from its maiden voyage, apparently the largest catch ever in Denmark.

== Recent developments ==
The harbour is currently being adapted to accommodate large international cruise ships. A new 450 m (1,480 ft) berth will be completed by 2015, while the existing 170 m (560 ft) berth will be extended to 200 m (660 ft). On the shipbuilding front, Karstensens Skibsværft continues to prosper with orders for trawlers from Norway. There are also plans for establishing oil-bunkering facilities for large vessels on the outer section of the new port.

In July 2014, Berlingske reported that from 2015 the enlarged harbour was expected to attract up to 40 large cruise ships per year compared to only a dozen smaller ships at present. The larger vessels will carry up to 3,500 passengers. Port of Skagen was covering the cost of the work which amounted to DKK 226 million (US$41 million). The new harbour would provide new jobs increasing the workforce from some 2,000 today to 2,600 on completion. Karstens Skibsværft, Danish Yacht, and the herring processing firm, Skagerrak Pelgic, were reported to be the most successful companies in Skagen but the town was also home to FF Skagen, the world's top producer of fish meal and fish oil.
