= Strandby =

- Town
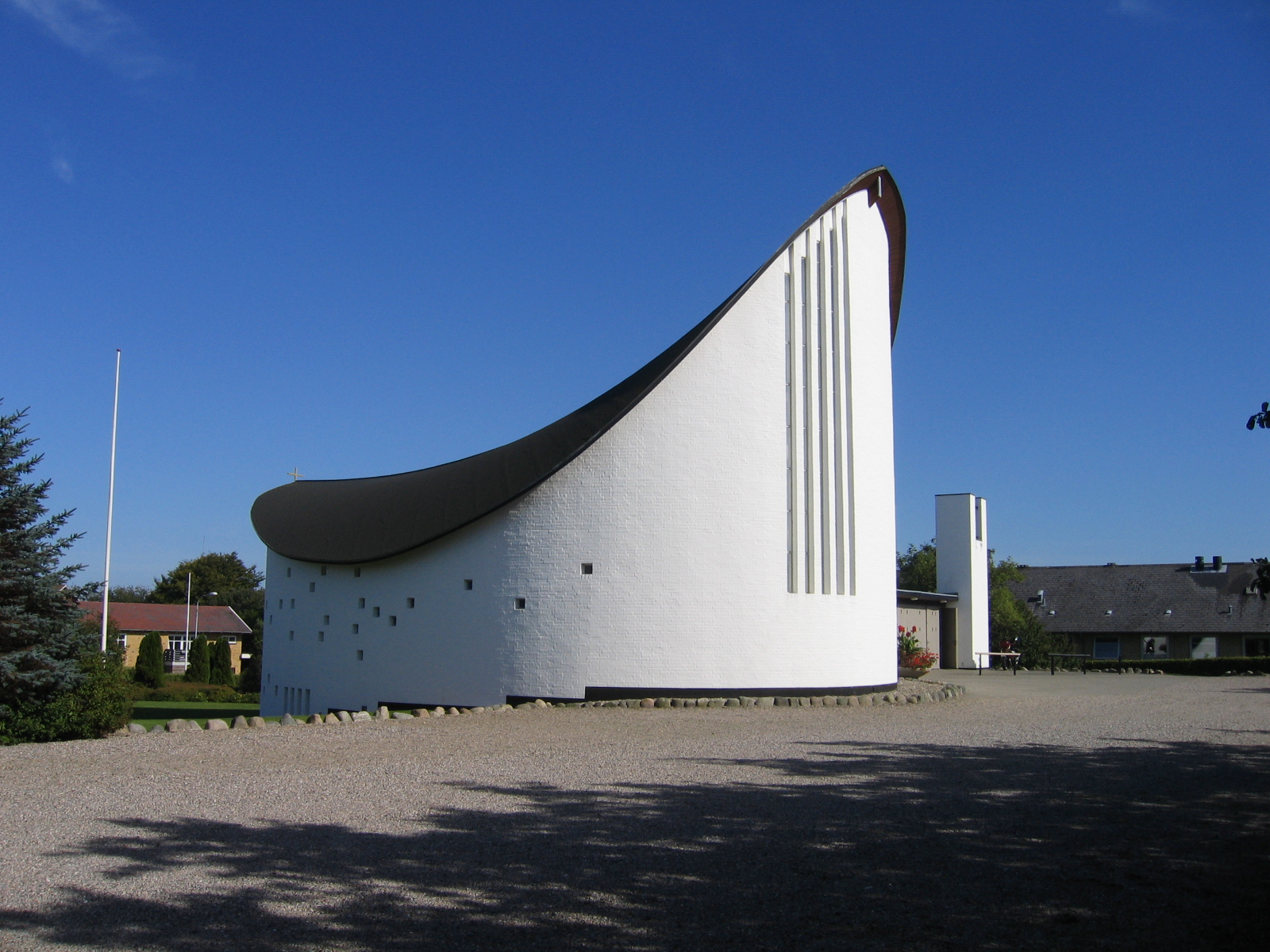
- Strandby Church

- Location in Denmark Strandby (North Jutland Region)
- Coordinates: 57°29′33″N 10°29′52″E
- Country: Denmark
- Region: Region Nordjylland
- Municipality: Frederikshavn

Area
  - Urban: 1.6 km^{2} (0.62 sq mi)

Population (2026)
  - Urban: 2,266
  - Urban density: 1,400/km^{2} (3,700/sq mi)
  - Gender: 1,102 males and 1,164 females
- Time zone: UTC+1 (CET)
  - Summer (DST): UTC+2 (CEST)
- Postal code: DK-9970 Strandby

Strandby is a coastal town in Denmark, located in Region Nordjylland. Its population was 2,266 as of 1 January 2026. It is located at the southern end of Ålbæk Bugt, the bay forming the eastern coast of the northern tip of the North Jutlandic Island, and about 4 km north of Frederikshavn. Strandby has two churches, Strandby Kirke, and a Methodist church.

It has been part of Frederikshavn Municipality since 1970; historically, it was in Elling parish, within Horns Herred hundred, Hjørring County.

The town is served by Strandby railway station, located on the Skagensbanen railway line between Frederikshavn in the southern end, and Skagen in the northern end.

A significant Viking Age hoard was discovered in a field near Strandby in September 2012, and systematically excavated in May 2013. The hoard consists of 365 items, including a silver Mjölnir pendant, and about 200 coins, including 60 Danish coins, dated to the period of Harald Bluetooth (including the rare korsmønter) and German coins, dated to the period of Otto I and Otto III, placing the hoard to the very end of the 10th or the very beginning of the 11th century.

== Notable people ==
- Allan Søgaard Larsen (born 1956 in Strandby) the former CEO of Falck A/S
