= Palle Bruun =

Danish hydraulic engineer

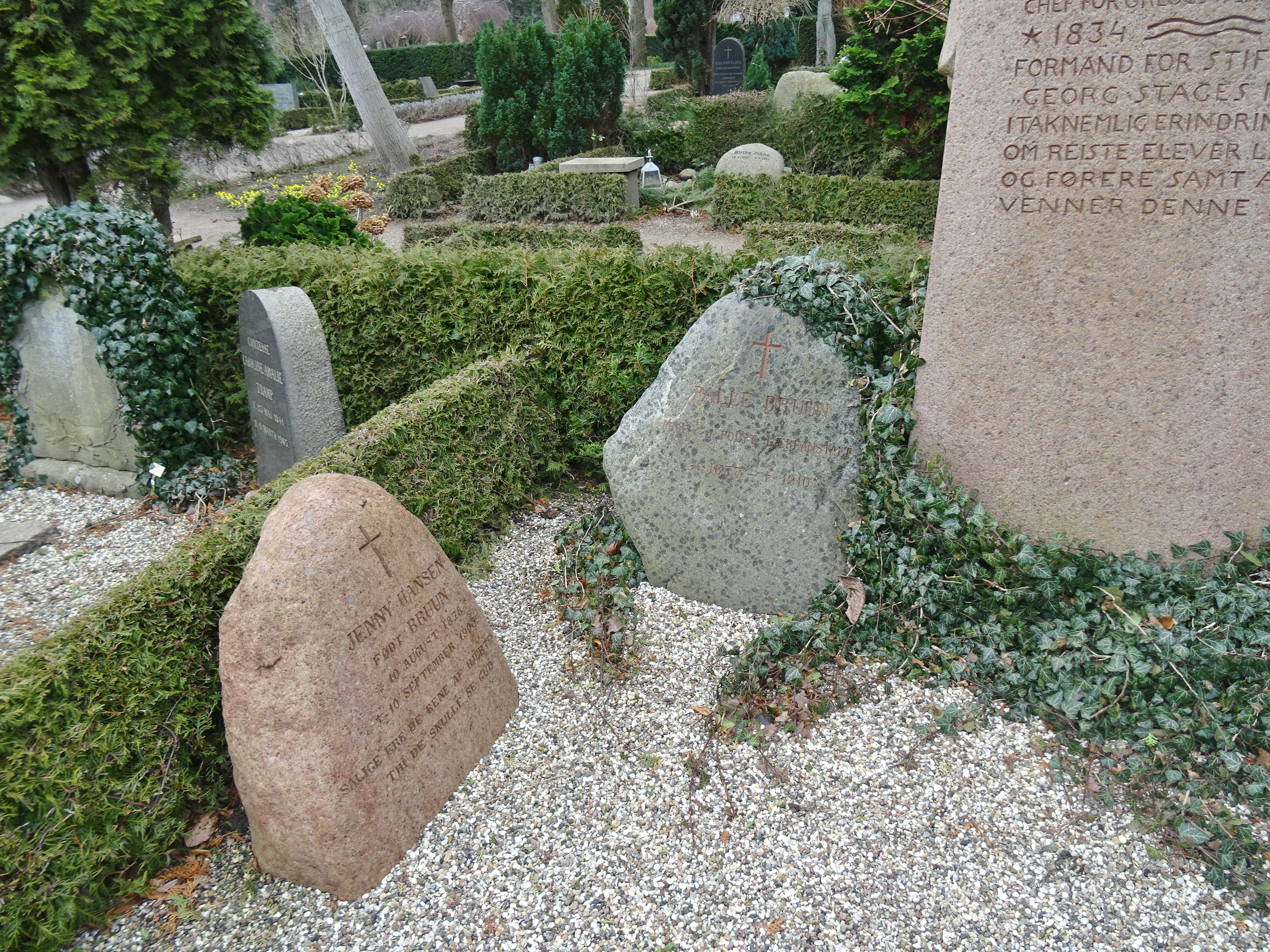
Grave of Palle Bruun at Holmens Kirkegård in Copenhagen.

Palle Bruun (10 May 1873 – 21 October 1910) was a Danish hydraulic engineer who designed the fishing harbour in Skagen in the north of Jutland.

== Biography ==
The son of Captain Carl Bruun, Bruun was born in Holmen, Copenhagen. After matriculating from Herlufsholm School in 1891, he completed his studies at Copenhagen's Technical University in 1898, immediately being commissioned to work for the Danish Board of Maritime Works (Vandbygningsvæsenet) where he was assigned to work in Esbjerg Harbour in 1899. From 1904, his responsibilities covered the design of harbour facilities in Skagen in the north of Jutland which were completed in 1907. In this connection, he studied the harbours in the Faroe Islands, draughting a report on his findings. In 1906, together with J. Munch-Petersen and H.P. Meden, in 1906 he was awarded a prize from the technical association for a study regarding the protection of Møns Klint from the effects of the sea.

By 1910, Bruun had become a close friend of the Skagen Painters, especially Anna Ancher with whom he corresponded over several years.
