= Ålbæk Bugt =

Bay off the coast of Denmark

Coordinates: 57°36′N 10°29′E

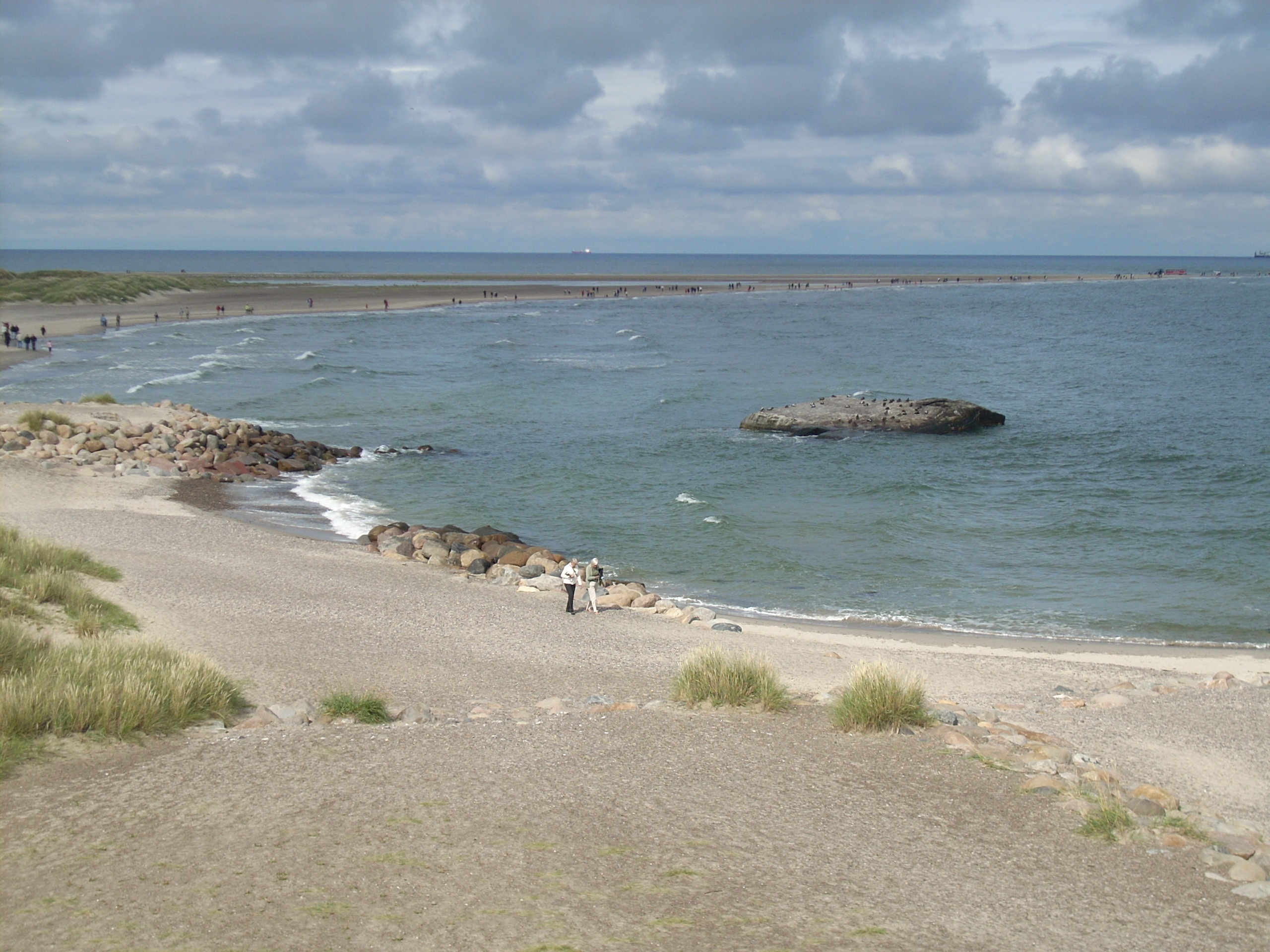
Ålbæk Bugt off the east coast of Grenen

Albæk Bugt (Albæk Bay) is a shallow bay, some 20 m (66 ft) deep, off the northeast coast of Skagen Odde in the north of Jutland, Denmark. It stretches from Skagen in the north to Hirsholmene to the south. On the Kattegat side of Vendsyssel, it is frequently used as an anchorage for vessels seeking shelter from the west wind in the Skagerrak.

The waters of the bay are relatively calm, making its beaches safe for bathing. Port of Skagen of located in Ålbæk Bugt.
