= Gærum =

- Village
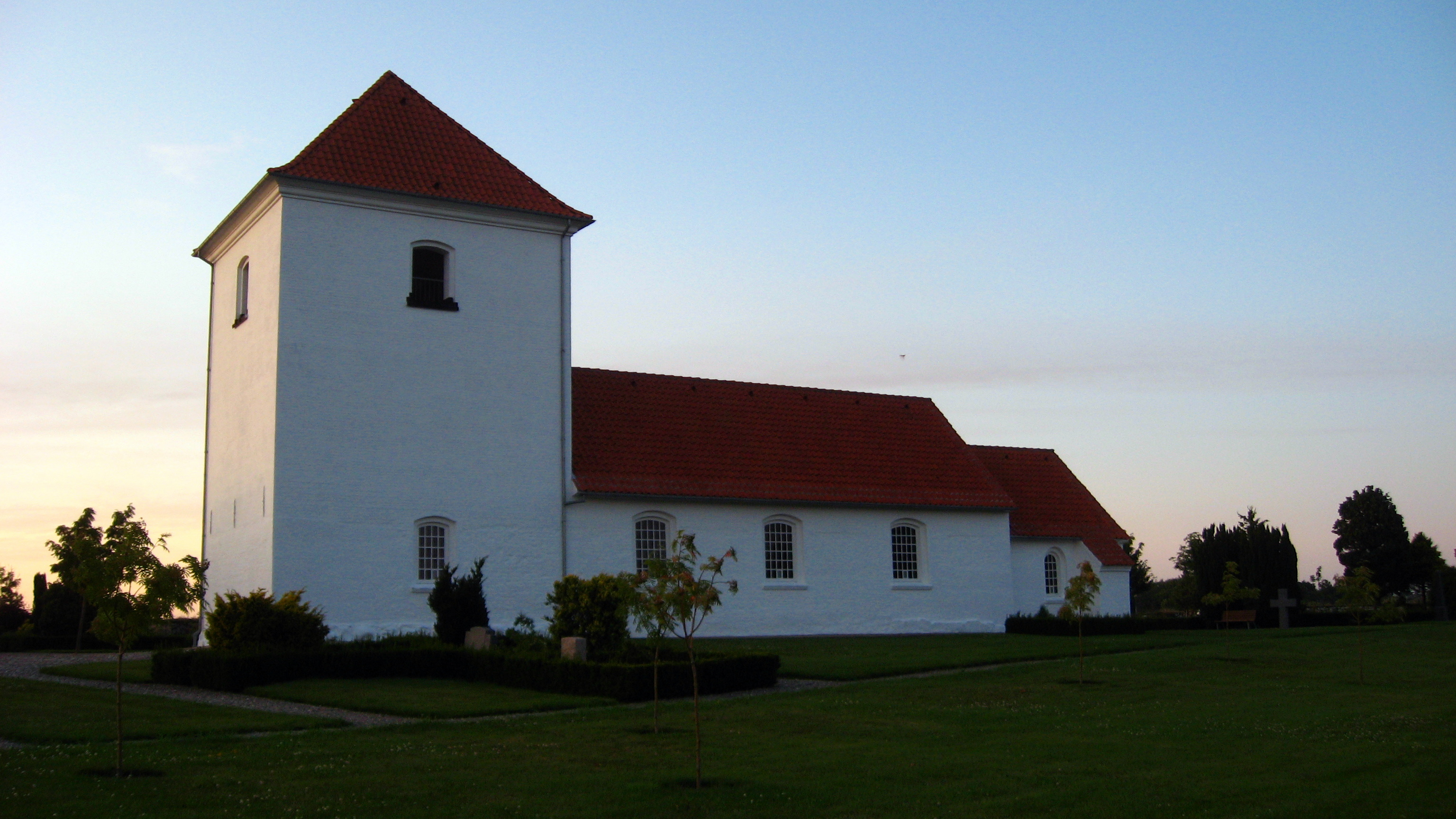
- Gærum Church

- Location in Denmark Gærum (North Jutland Region)
- Coordinates: 57°23′55″N 10°25′38″E
- Country: Denmark
- Region: North Jutland Region
- Municipality: Frederikshavn Municipality

Population (2026)
  - Urban: 605
- Time zone: UTC+1 (CET)
  - Summer (DST): UTC+2 (CEST)
- Postal code: DK-9900 Frederikshavn

Gærum is a village in Frederikshavn Municipality in North Jutland Region, Denmark. On 1 January 2026 it had a population of 605. It is located in the northeastern part of the Vendsyssel district 7 km southwest of Frederikshavn.

Gærum Church is located in the village.
