= Dybvad =

- Town
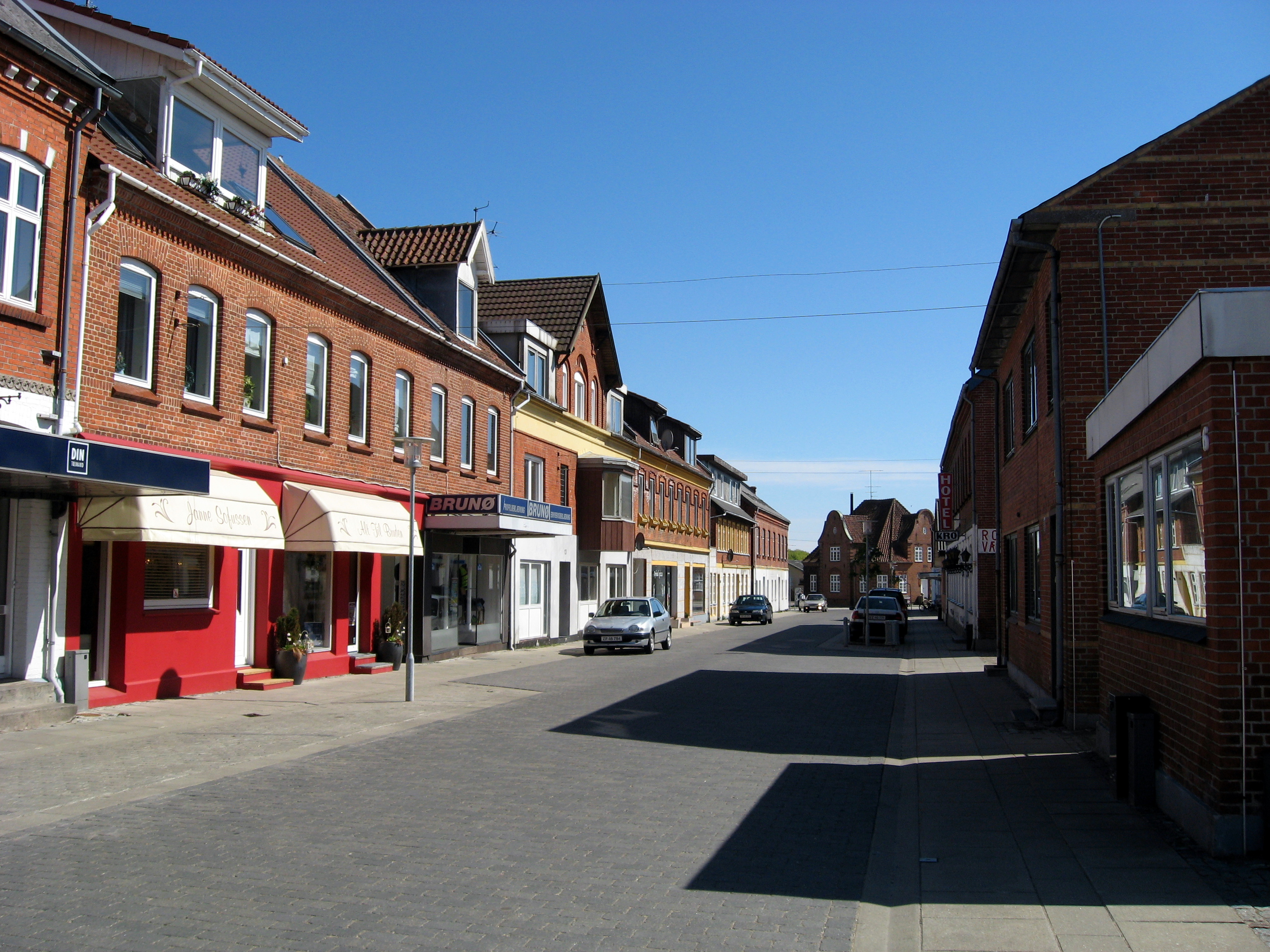
- Dybvad in 2010

- Location in North Jutland Region Dybvad (Denmark)
- Coordinates: 57.27607°N 10.35867°E
- Country: Denmark
- Region: North Jutland Region
- Municipality: Frederikshavn

Population (2026)
  - Total: 596
- Time zone: UTC+1 (CET)
  - Summer (DST): UTC+2 (CEST)

Dybvad is a small town situated in the south of Frederikshavn Municipality in north Jutland, Denmark.

The population of Dybvad is 596 (1 January 2026). The town has excellent road links to Frederikshavn to the north, and Aalborg to the south. The town is surrounded chiefly by open farmland.

Although a quiet town, Dybvad hosts an open-air music festival in August, called Dybvad Open Air. The festival is usually attended by approximately 2000 people and is held at Søparken (the lake park).
