= Frederikshavn Municipality =

Frederikshavn Municipality Frederikshavn Kommune (Danish)
- Municipality
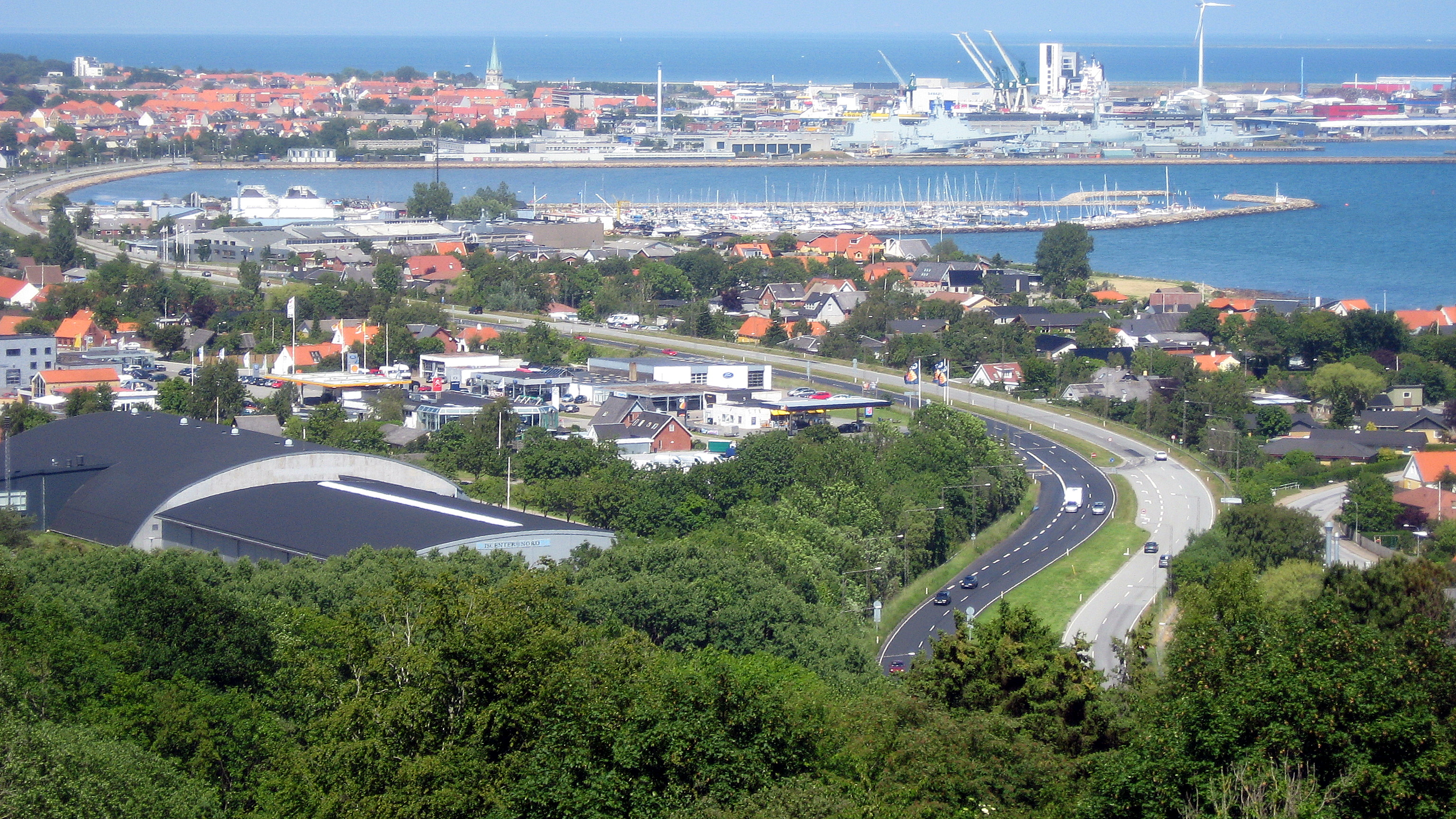

- wordmark

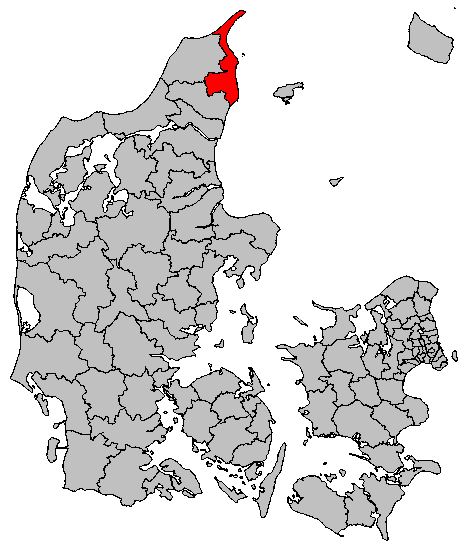
- Coordinates: 57°26′13″N 10°23′36″E
- Country: Denmark
- Region: Region Nordjylland
- City charter: 1818
- Current municipality: 1 January 2007
- Seat: Frederikshavn

Government
  - Mayor: Jon Andersen

Area
  - Total: 648.6 km^{2} (250.4 sq mi)

Population (1 January 2026)
  - Total: 57,523
  - Density: 88.69/km^{2} (229.7/sq mi)
- Time zone: UTC1 (CET)
  - Summer (DST): UTC2 (CEST)
- Website: frederikshavn.dk

Frederikshavn Municipality (Danish: Frederikshavn Kommune) is the northernmost Danish municipality, located in Region Nordjylland.

As a result of Kommunalreformen ("The Municipal Reform" of 2007), it is a merger between the previous municipalities of Frederikshavn, Skagen and Sæby. The new municipality has an area of 642 km² and a total population of 57,523 (2026).

The first mayor of the new municipality was Erik Sørensen (Social Democrats) until 31. December 2013. Mayor from 2026 Jon Andersen, from the agrarian liberal Venstre.

== Towns ==
The following is a list of settlements within the municipality by population.

Frederikshavn	23,000
Sæby	8,700
Skagen	8,200
Strandby	2,400
Ålbæk	1,500
Østervrå	1,300

Elling	1,200
Kilden	900
Gærum	650
Dybvad	640
Ravnshøj	640
Jerup	620

Voerså	570
Hørby	440
Kvissel	430
Halbjerg	340
Thorshøj	280
Syvsten	270

== Mayor ==
For a list of mayors in Skagen and Sæby before the 2007 merger, see below.

=== Frederikshavn ===
#	Name	Took office	Left office	Political Party
1	F. E. E. Erichsen	1870	1882	By royal decree
2	Niels Tvede	1882	1899	By royal decree
3	C. A. Ramsing	1900	1913	By royal decree
4	P. E. Holsøe	1913	1919	By royal decree
5	Christen Elius Andersen	1919	1920	Conservatives
6	Johan Gustav Hassing	1920	1933	Conservatives
7	Frithjof Houmøller	1933	1936	Conservatives
8	Harald Victor Alster	1936	1937	Conservatives
9	Lars Christian Fisker	1937	1950	Social Democrats
10	Westy Beckett	1950	1954	Conservatives
11	Lars Christian Fisker	1954	1960	Social Democrats
12	Harald Jensen	1960	1965	Social Democrats
13	Christian Pedersen	1965	1970	Social Democrats
14	Villy Christensen	1970	1985	Social Democrats
15	Ove Christensen	1986	1993	Social Democrats
16	Jens Christian Larsen	1994	1997	Venstre
17	Erik Sørensen	1998	2006	Social Democrats
Merger
17	Erik Sørensen	2007	2009	Social Democrats
18	Lars Møller	2010	2013	Venstre
19	Birgit Hansen	2014	2024	Social Democrats
20	Karsten Thomsen	2024	Incumbent	Social Democrats

=== Former Skagen municipality ===
#	Name	Took office	Left office	Political Party
1	Iver Christensen	1919	1924	
2	Jakob Peder Jacobsen	1924	1925	Indre Mission
3	Søren Møller	1924	1942	
4	Thomas Andreasen Geisnæs	1942	1946	
5	Holger Hansen	1946	1950	
6	A. M. Nielsen	1950	1958	
7	Carl Berg	1958	1968	
8	Poul Møller	1968	1972	
9	Carl Winther	1972	1974	
10	H. Nibe Hansen	1972	1974	
11	Erik Thomsen	1986	1989	
12	H. Nibe Hansen	1990	1971	
13	Inger Støtt	1992	1993	Venstre
14	Kurt Kirkedal Jensen	1994	2001	Social Democrats
18	Hans Rex Christensen	2002	2006	Venstre

=== Former Sæby municipality ===
#	Name	Took office	Left office	Political Party
1	P. Dicksen	1919	1921	
2	N. P. Nielsen	1921	1929	
3	P. Lund	1929	1933	
4	Louis Nielsen	1933	1934	Social Democrats
5	N. P. Nielsen	1934	1943	
6	Christian Kjærsgaard	1943	1943	
7	Aage Neergaard	1943	1946	Venstre
8	Christian Kjærsgaard	1946	1950	Venstre
9	Erling Mehlsen	1950	1958	Conservatives
10	Aage Neergaard	1958	1960	Venstre
11	Laurids Christensen	1960	1966	Social Democrats
12	Erling Mehlsen	1966	1970	Conservatives
13	Ingemann Christensen	1970	1974	Venstre
14	Frede Fredborg Christensen	1974	1989	Venstre
15	Hans Krarup Olesen	1990	1993	
16	Leif Bak	1994	1997	Social Democrats
17	Folmer Hansen	1998	2006	Venstre

== Politics ==
=== Municipal council ===
Frederikshavn's municipal council consists of 29 members, elected every four years.

Below is the current council composition.

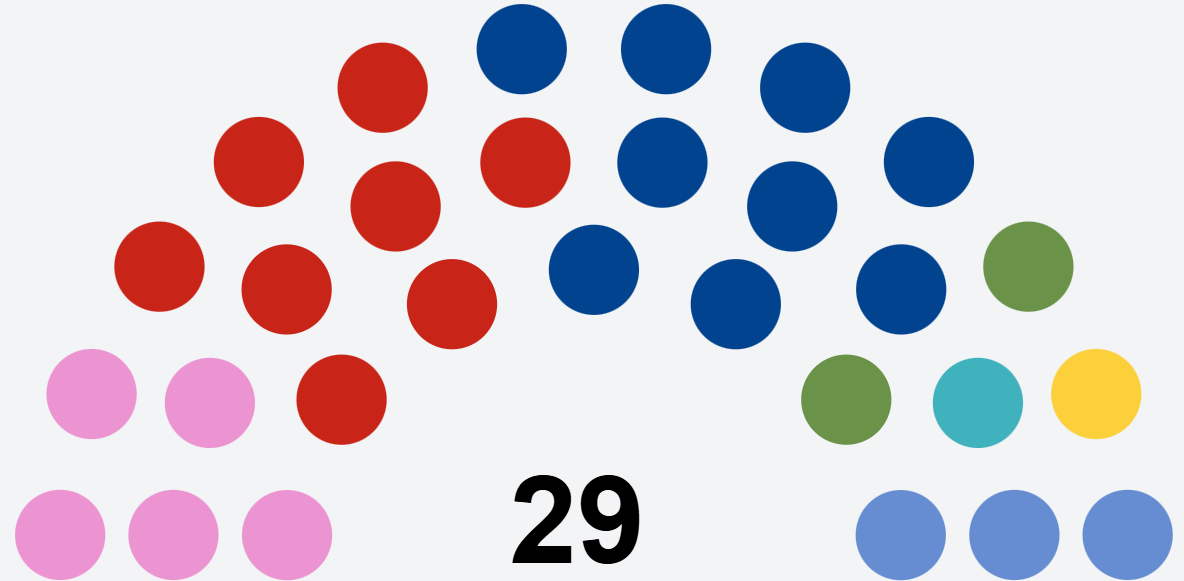

Below are the municipal councils elected between the enactment of the Municipal Reform of 2007 and the 2025 Danish local elections.

Election	Party									Total seats	Turnout	Elected mayor	
Election	A	C	D	F	O	T	U	V	Ø	Total seats	Turnout	Elected mayor	
2005	15	1		2	1	1	1	10		31	66.8%	Erik Sørensen (A)	
2009	11	2		5	3			10		31	64.2%	Lars Møller (V)	
2013	14	1		1	4			10	1	31	72.3%	Birgit Stenbak Hansen (A)	
2017	18	1		1	2			6	1	29	71.5%	Birgit Stenbak Hansen (A)	
2021	18	2	1	1	1			6		29	68.1%	Birgit Stenbak Hansen (A)	Data from Kmdvalg.dk 2005, 2009, 2013, 2017 and 2021.

== Twin towns – sister cities ==
Frederikshavn is twinned with:

- Borlänge, Sweden
- Bremerhaven, Germany
- Larvik, Norway
- Qeqqata, Greenland
- Qingdao, China
- Tranås, Sweden

== See also ==
- Grenen
- North Jutlandic Island
