= Allan Søgaard Larsen =

Danish business executive

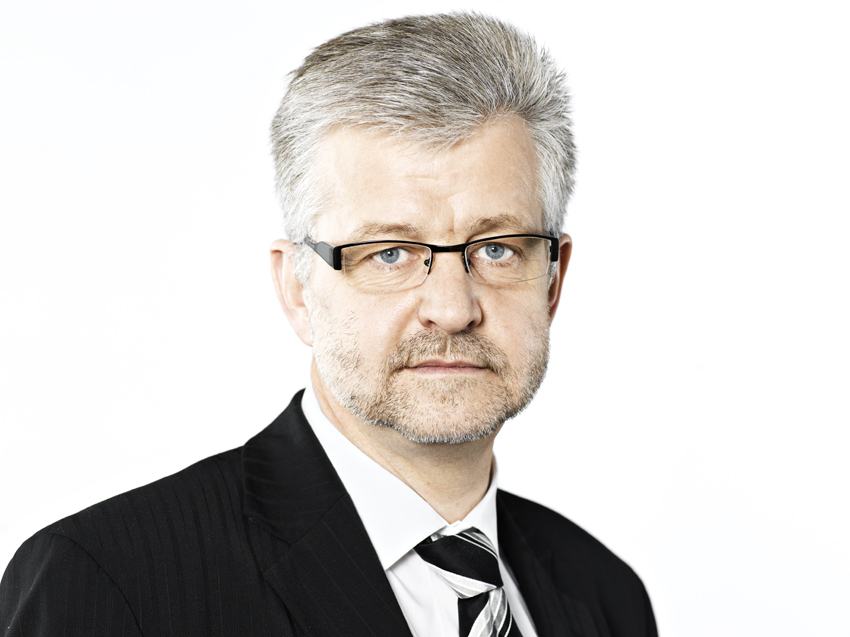
Allan Larsen

Allan Søgaard Larsen (born January 29, 1956, Strandby, Denmark) is the former CEO of Falck A/S and by extension Falck USA, a position he held until the end of 2016. He is regarded as one of the most wealthy executives in Denmark. Under Larsen's leadership, Falck evolved from a Nordic rescue group into the world's largest private Emergency Medical Services and Industrial Firefighting organization. He is also known for co-founding the LøkkeFonden, a charitable fund and associated Educational Academy designed to assist at-risk boys.

== Education ==
Larsen graduated in 1974 from Vesthimmerlands Gymnasium in Aars. He continued his education at Aarhus University with a focus on the Nordic language, literature and English. He received his Master's Degree in 1981 and completed postgraduate training to become a teacher in 1982.

== Career ==
Larsen started his career as a teacher at the Technical School in Randers. In 1984 his career changed direction and he became a recruiter for Aarhus Tramways in the Municipality of Aarhus.

In 1990 joined Allan Søgaard Larsen of Falck A/S (then known as the Falck Rescue Corps). He was first employed as a personnel manager in the Northern Region and remained in this position until 1995. As Human Resources manager, he was responsible for the region's personnel matters, negotiations with trade unions, collective bargaining and operating conditions.

In 1995 he was appointed project manager and vice president of Falck, where he was responsible for the merger of the two companies Falck Securitas and Falck Rescue Corps. Larsen was successful in this role, and 1997 was promoted to the position of Managing Director of Region West, which covers a major area of Denmark. In the early 2000s he was further promoted to Director of the entire Falck Rescue Group, which at that time was part of subsidiary of the bigger Falck organization. In 2004 he was promoted to the position of CEO of Falck A/S. He left this position in 2016, having worked at Falck for a total of 27 years.

The honor of Knight of Dannebrog was bestowed upon Larsen in 2011.

== Personal life ==
Larsen is married, with two children. He is a runner, and met a goal that he set to run 25 Marathons before his 60th birthday. Much of Falck's ownership is philanthropic in nature and Larsen himself is considered by some to be a Socialist. Despite this, he has never officially confirmed his political leanings.
