= Elling, Denmark =

Elling
- Town
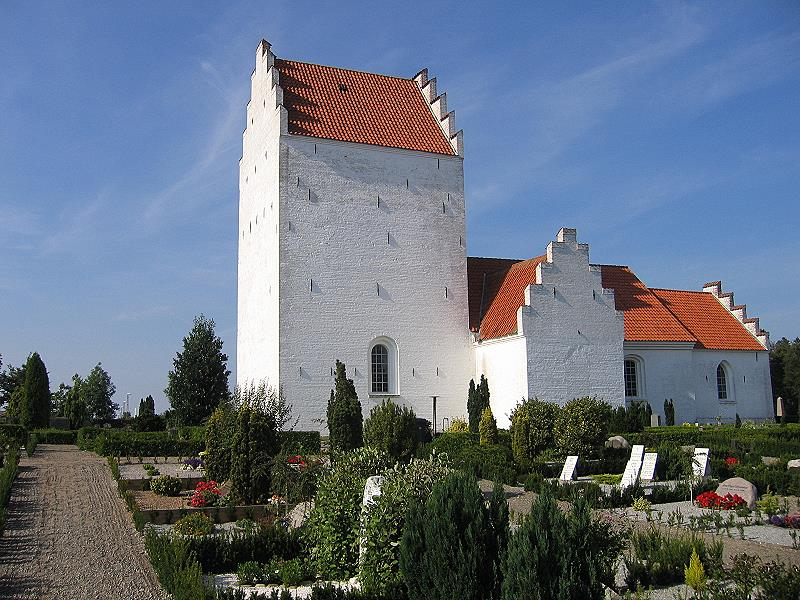
- The village church in Elling, seen from the south

- Location in North Jutland Region Elling (Denmark) Elling (Europe)
- Coordinates: 57°28′41″N 10°28′41″E
- Country: Denmark
- Region: North Denmark Region
- Municipality: Frederikshavn Municipality
- Parish: Elling Parish

Area
  - Urban: 0.93 km^{2} (0.36 sq mi)

Population (2026)
  - Urban: 1,081
  - Urban density: 1,200/km^{2} (3,000/sq mi)
- Time zone: UTC+1 (CET)
  - Summer (DST): UTC+2 (CEST)
- Website: www.ellingborger.dk

Elling is a village with a population of 1,081 (1 January 2026) in the Vendsyssel region, North Jutland, Denmark, located in Elling Parish outside of Frederikshavn.

Nearby is Elling Å, a stream whose estuary hosts nearly extinct marsh fritillary butterflies.

Its 13th-century church is especially notable.

== Notable people ==
- Connie Nielsen (born 1965 in Frederikshavn) actress, was brought up in the town
- Lotte Kiærskou (born 1975 in Frederikshavn) team handball player, won two team gold medals in the 2000 and 2004 Summer Olympics; she grew up in the town.
