= Voerså =

- Village
- Location in North Jutland Region Voerså (Denmark)
- Coordinates: 57°12′32″N 10°29′17″E
- Country: Denmark
- Region: North Jutland Region
- Municipality: Frederikshavn

Area
  - Urban: 0.63 km^{2} (0.24 sq mi)

Population (2026)
  - Urban: 473
  - Urban density: 750/km^{2} (1,900/sq mi)

Voerså is a small fishing village located around 14 km south of Sæby, on the east coast of Vendsyssel, Denmark. It has a population of 473 (1 January 2026).

Voerså's scenic beaches attract some summer tourism to the village and its surrounding countryside.

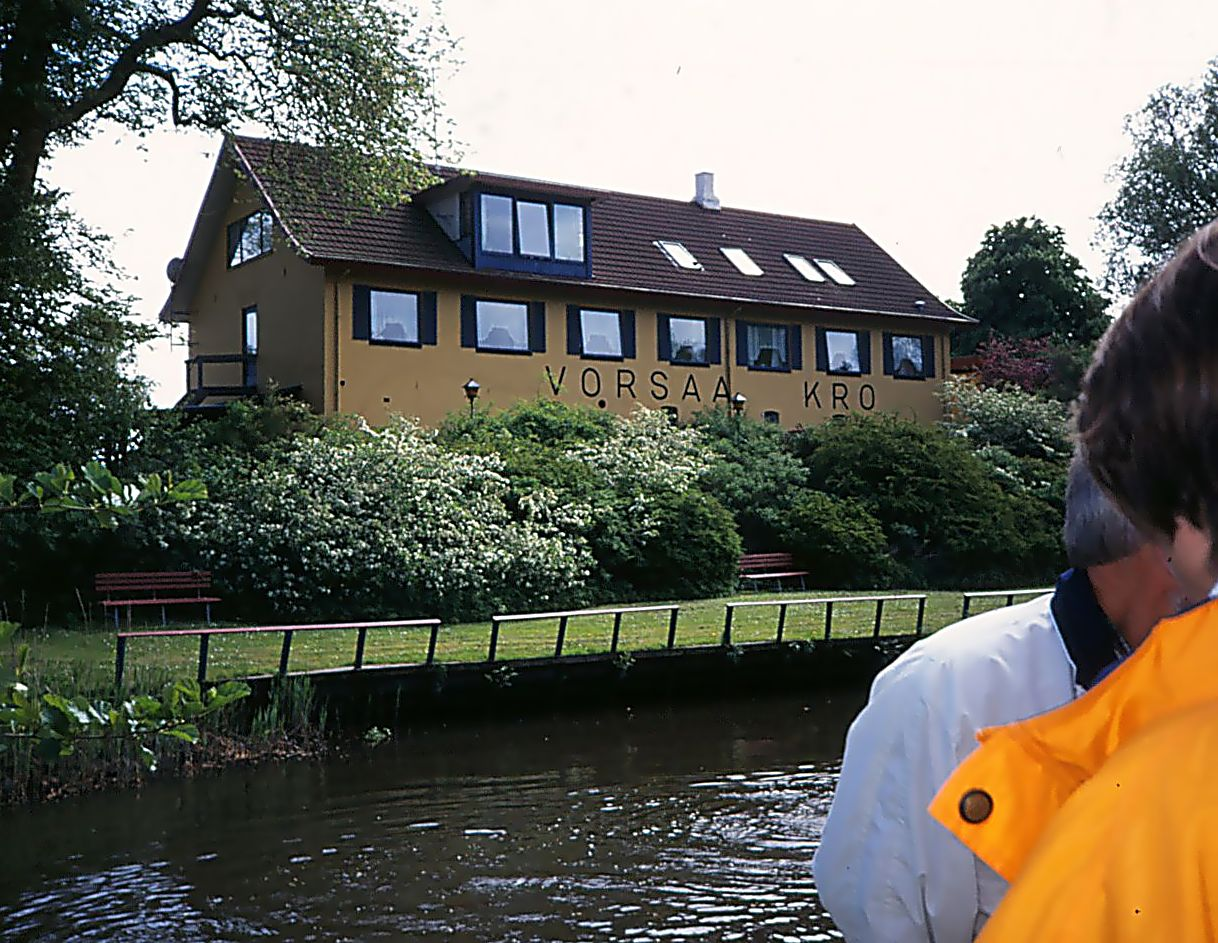
Sailing on Voers Å below Voerså Inn, which burned down in 2006
