= Jörgen Philip-Sörensen =

Swedish businessman (1938–2010)

Niels Jörgen Philip-Sörensen (born 23 September 1938 in Malmö, died 18 January 2010 in London) was a Swedish businessman of Danish ancestry.

Philip-Sörensen led the demerger of security company Group 4 from Securitas AB in 1981. He went on to become Chairman of Group 4 and then of G4S before he retired in 2006. In later years, Philip-Sörensen lived in England, where he was among the nation's wealthiest individuals. Sometimes he visited Skagen in his father's native Denmark, where he owned Ruth's Hotel.Buried in Højen graveyard Højen, Frederikshavn Municipality.

== See also ==
- Ecover
