= Nicolai Elias Tuxen =

Royal Danish Navy officer and politician

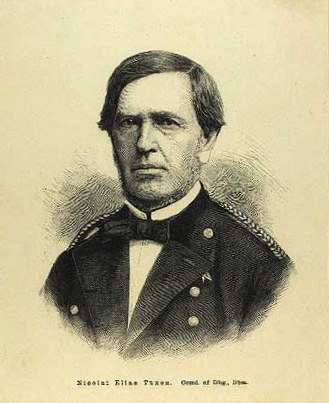
Nicolai Elias Tuxen

Captain Nicolai Elias Tuxen (21 November 1810 – 10 December 1891) was a Royal Danish Navy officer and politician. He was the technical director of the Orlogsværftet in Copenhagen and a member of the Danish Constituent Assembly. Tuxen was also the father of painter Laurits Tuxen.

== Early life ==
Tuxen was born in Fladstrand, the son of first lieutenant and later commander lieutenant Peter Mandrup Tuxen (1783-1838) and Elisabeth M. Simonsen (1786-1867). He was the elder brother of Georg Emil Tuxen and Johan Cornelius Tuxen.

== Career ==
Tuxen followed the family tradition, enrolling at the Royal Danish Naval Cadet Academy in 1822. He graduated with Gerner's Medal in 1829. After a voyage to the Danish West Indies with the brig St. Jan in 1831-32 he was employed as a teacher of mathematics at the Royal Danish Naval Academy until 1846. He was promoted to first lieutenant in 1839, captain lieutenant in 1847 and captain in 1854.

In 1838, he was also employed as an instruction officer at the dock in Copenhagen. In 1841, he was made a member of the Construction Commission. In 1843-45, he was in England, North America, France and the Netherlands to study engineering, hydraulics and other technical advances in ship building. Back in Denmark, he was promoted to first teacher in mathematics at the Naval Academy.

In 1946, he was appointed as leader of the navy's department for engineering, water and hydraulics. In 1858, he instigated the construction of a new dry dock in Christianshavn. In 1864, he was also appointed as director of ship building at the Royal Naval Dockyards. He retired in 1883.

== Politics ==
In 1848, Tuxen was elected for the Danish Constituent Assembly at Nyboder. He was subsequently elected for the Folketing, first in Copenhagen's 5th Constituency (1852-54) and then in Frederiksværk Constituency (1855-58). From 1856 he was also a member of Rigsrådet. From 1878, he was appointed to the Landsting by the king.

== Other activities ==
He was for many years one of the directors of the Det kgl. octroierede almindelige Brandassurance-Compagni. He published a number of written works, including two publications on the Tuxen family (1883 and 1888.

== Personal life ==
Tuxen was married on 4 July 1838 in Holmen Church to Bertha Laura Giødvad (1815-1908), daughter of naval officer Jens Berlin Giødvad (1782-1816) and Judithe Kiellerup (1788-1850). The couple had seven children, including the painters Laurits Tuxen and Nicoline Tuxen. Their sister daughter Elisabeth was married to the theologian Carl Henrik Scharling and her younger sister was married to the economist and politician Hans William Scharling.

At the time of the 1845 census his home was a first floor apartment at Store Kongensgade] No. 94 (now Wildersgade 34) in Christianshavn. He lived there with his wife and their three first children. At the time of the 1860 census his home was an apartment at Strandgade No. 30 in Christianshavn. He lived there with his wife, seven of their children (aged seven to 19), one lodger and two maids.

== Accolade ==
Tuxen was created a Knight in the Order of the Dannebrog in 1846. In 1851, he was awarded the Cross of Honour. In 1858, he was created a Commander in the Order of the Dannebrog. In 1768, he was also awarded the Medal of Merit.
