= Evening Party in the Studio on Strandvejen =

Painting by Laurits Tuxen

- Aftenselskab i atelieret på Strandvejen (Danish)
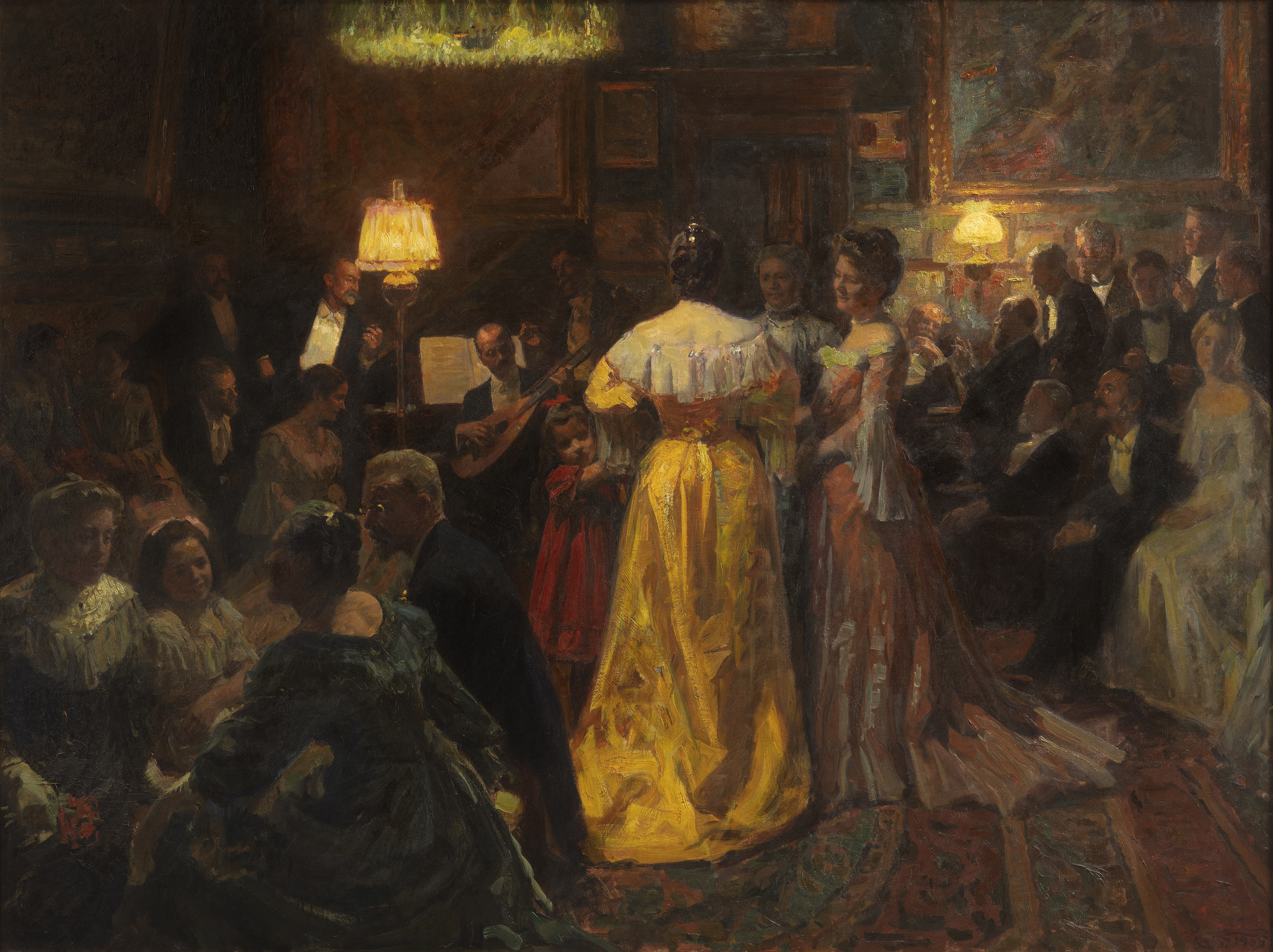
- Artist: Laurits Tuxen
- Year: 1905
- Medium: oil on canvas
- Dimensions: 125 cm × 167 cm (49 in × 66 in)

Evening Party in the Studio on Strandvejen (Danish: Aftenselskab i atelieret på Strandvejen) is a 1905 oil-on-canvas group portrait painting by Laurits Tuxen depicting a social gathering in the artist's home on Strandvejen in Copenhagen. In 2019, it was acquired by Skagen Museum.

== History ==
Lauritz Tuxen resided at Strandvejn 24 from 1901 to 1909. He began working on the painting in April 1904 and it was completed for the Charlottenborg Spring Exhibition the following year. The painting was shortly thereafter sold to a private buyer. It remained in the hands of the same family for more than one hundred years. In 2019, it was acquired by Skagen Museum with economic support from the Augustinus Foundation and the Ny Carlsberg Foundation.

== Description ==
The painting shows a social gathering in Tuxen's studio. The people seen in the painting are:

- Anna Bissen
- Yvonne Tuxen
- Mary Henningsen
- Vilhelm Bissen
- Helga Weis
- Valdemar Irminger
- Anna Ancher
- Nicoline Tuxen
- Michael Therkildsen
- A. P. Weis
- Jørgen Møller
- Peder Severin Krøyer
- Nina Tuxen
- Frederikke Tuxen
- Julie Scharling
- Fru Hornemann
- Michael Ancher
- Frans Schwartz
- Erik Henningsen
- Laurits Tuxen
- Eduard Saltoft
- Aage Roose
- Hans Christian Kofoed
- Esther Paulsen
- Julius Paulsen,
- William Scharling
