= Georg Emil Tuxen =

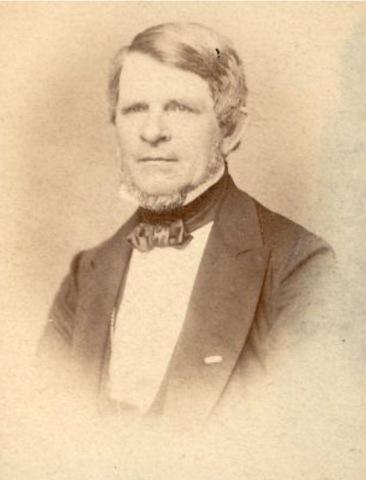
Georg Emil Tuxen

Captain Georg Emil Tuxen (11 December 1814 – 21 September 1885) was a Royal Danish Navy officer.

== Early life ==
Tuxen was born in Copenhagen, the son of first lieutenant and later commander lieutenant Peter Mandrup Tuxen (1783-1838) and Elisabeth M. Simonsen (1786-1867). He was the brother of Nicolai Elias Tuxen and Johan Cornelius Tuxen.

== Career ==
Tuxen followed the family tradition, enrolling at the Royal Danish Naval Cadet Academy in 1828. He graduated with Gerner's Medal and the King's Seal of Honour in 1834. In 1837–38, he was in the Danish West Indies with the brig St. Thomas, where he was used for surveying. Back in Denmark, he began studying navigation and astronomy. 1842 saw him promoted to first lieutenant and he was the same year sent to the Mediterranean Sea with the frigate HDMS Thetis. In 1846–54, he served as teacher in navigation at the Royal Danish Naval Academy, although this work was interrupted by the outbreak of the First Schleswig War. In 1847, he was second-in-command of the brig St. Croix during the Danzig and its successful confrontation with the steamer Preusiche Adler. In 1849, when serving on board the brig Gefion, in the North Sea, he participated in the blockade of the Elbe. in the North Sea. In 1850, he was second-in-command on board the cadet ship Diana on a voyage to Iceland. In 1843, he was second-in-command of the cadet ship Valkyrien on a voyage to the Danish West Indies.

In 1851, Tuxen was appointed as director of navigation. He was promoted to captain lieutenant in 1852 and captain in 1864. When the position as director of navigation was converted into a separate office, in 1860, Tuxen was dismissed from the navy with honorary rank of commander. He increased the number of navigational schools in Denmark from two to seven and standardized teaching practices. In 1856, he and his brother Johan Corn. Tuxen wrote a textbook on navigation for use at the Royal Naval Academy as well as the country's navigational schools. He retired ultimo 1884 due to poor health resulting from earlier the same year having wrecked with a boat en route to Fanø.

== Personal life ==
Tuxen was on 23 September 1843 in Holmen Church married to Andrea Meyer (1817–1890), daughter of artillery officer Andreas Bruun Meyer (1777-1836) and Sophie Christine Barth (1779-1861). The couple had seven children, including the agriculturalist and educator Sophus Christian Andreas Tuxen (1848–1924) and filologist Søren Ludvig Tuxen (1759–1919).

At the time of the 1885 census his home was a first-floor apartment at Sankt Knuds Vej 13 in Frederiksberg. Two of their sons, Søren Ludvig Tuxen and were also naval officers.

Tuxen died on 21 September 1995 and was buried in Golmen Cemetery.

== Accolades ==
Tuxen was created a Knight in the Order of the Dannebrog in 1849. In 1876, he was awarded the Cross of Honour. In 1884, he was created a second-class commander in the Order of the Dannebrog.
