= The North Sea in Stormy Weather =

1909 painting by Laurits Tuxen

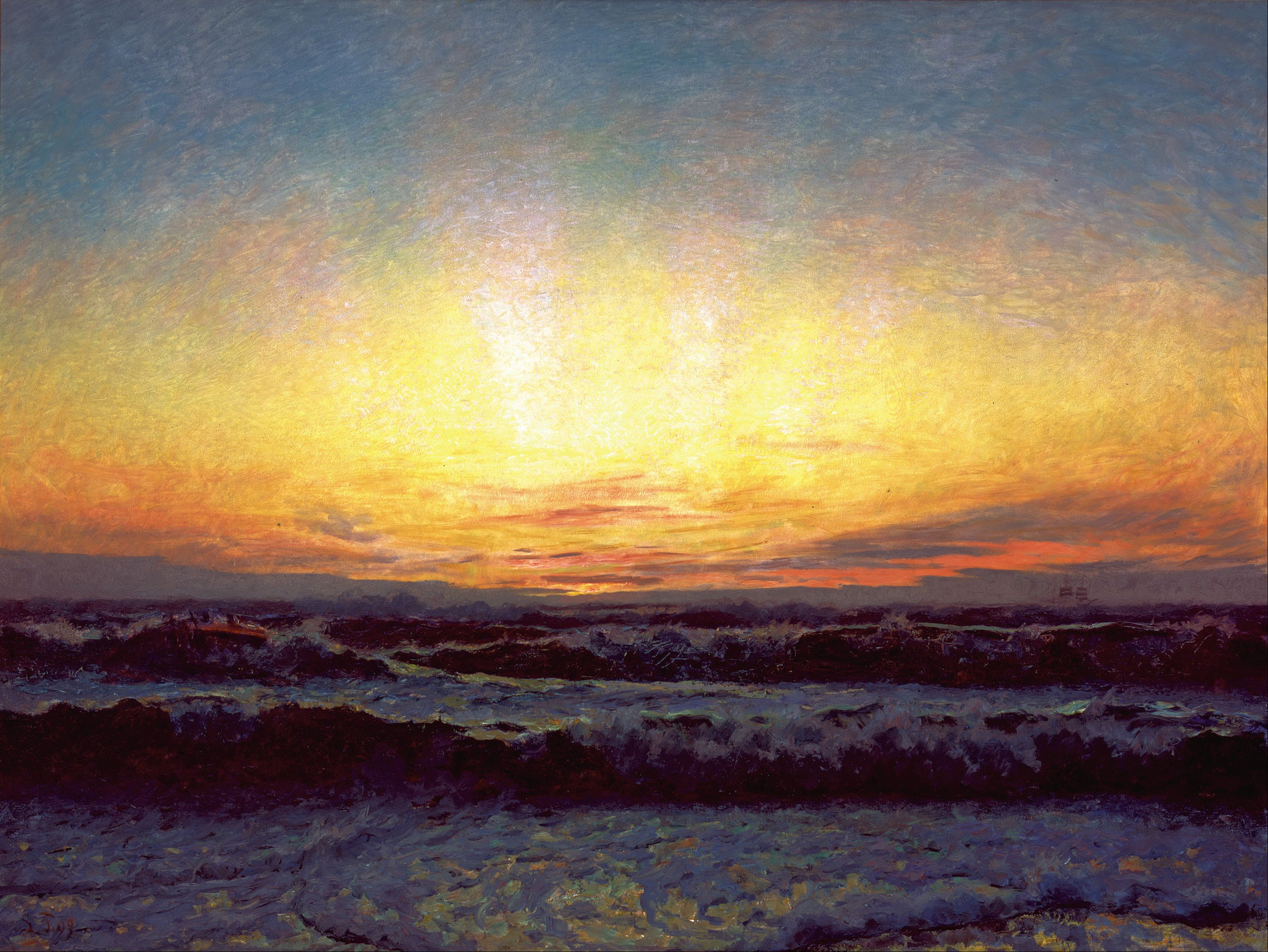
Laurits Tuxen: The North Sea in Stormy Weather. After Sunset. Højen (1909)

The North Sea in Stormy Weather. After Sunset. Højen (Danish: Vesterhavet i storm. Efter solnedgang. Højen) is a 1909 painting by Laurits Tuxen. Although his paintings of Skagen date from the beginning of the 20th century, Tuxen is now considered to be one of artists known as the Skagen Painters who gathered in very north of Denmark in the 1870s and 1880s.

== Background ==
The Skagen Painters were a close-knit group of mainly Danish artists who gathered each summer from the late 1870s in the fishing village of Skagen in the far north of Jutland, painting the local fishermen and their own gatherings and celebrations. Laurits Tuxen (1853-1927), a graduate of the Royal Danish Academy of Fine Arts in Copenhagen, first visited Skagen in 1870. After further visits in the 1870s, he finally acquired a summer residence there with his second wife Frederikke Treschow in 1901. He was not present in Skagen when the artists' colony reached its heights in the 1880s but he is now considered to be one of Skagen's most important painters, thanks to the many works he painted between 1901 and his death in 1927. He is however remembered first and foremost for his large portraits of the royal families of Europe.

== Painting description ==
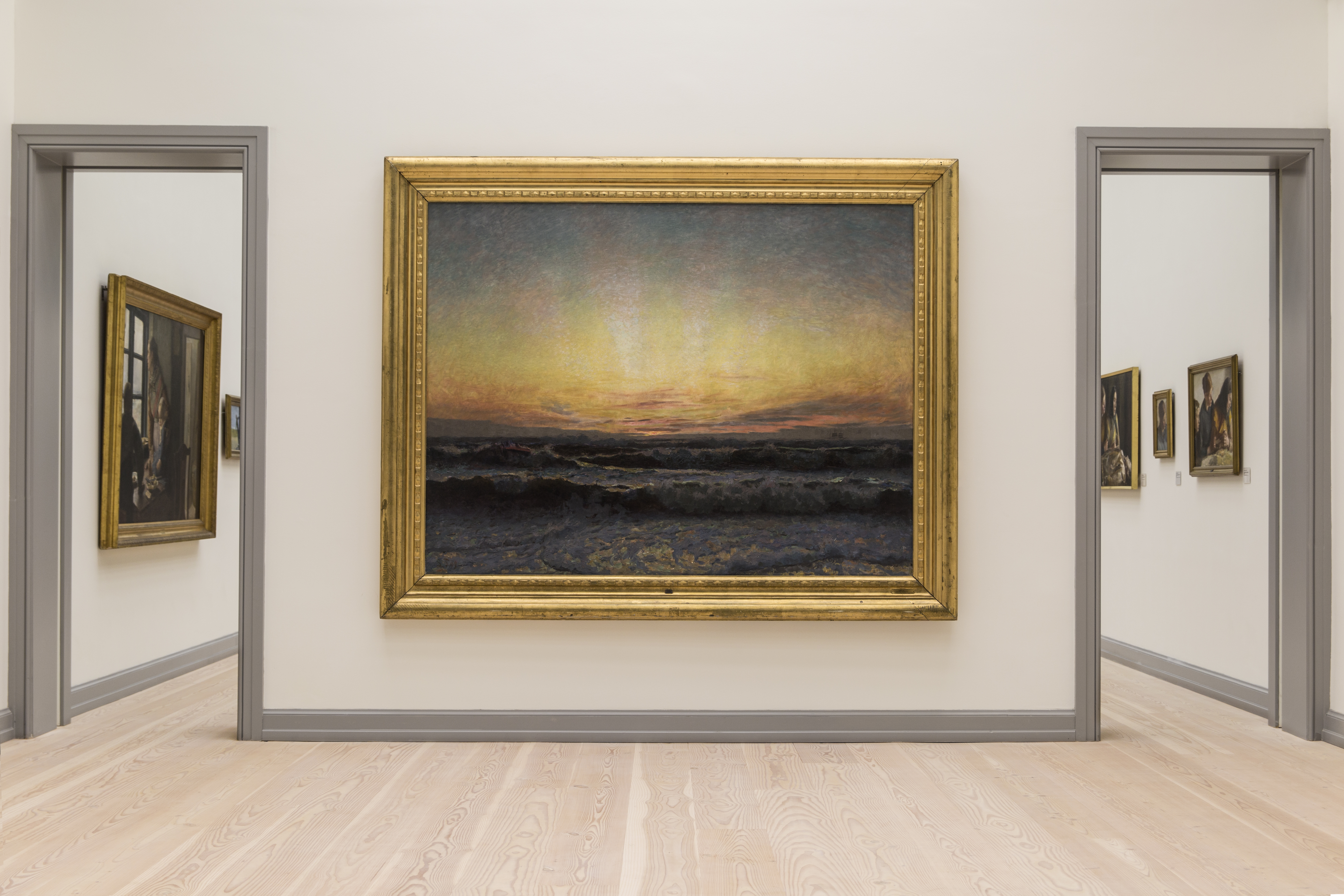
The painting on display in Skagens Museum, 2017.

The North Sea in a Storm is a painting of the sea at Højen on the west coast of Skagen Odde. Measuring 176 by 234 centimetres (69 in × 92 in) it is one of Tuxen's largest works. As a result of its monumental size, it gives the observer the impression he is standing beside the turbulent sea, especially as the waves reach right to the bottom of the frame. The blues and greens of the sea contrast with the warm orange and yellow shades of the sky. The sun has just set, its last rays reflected in the lower waves. While many of the works of the Skagen Painters depict the beaches, Tuxen's painting is restricted to the sea itself.

The Tuxens donated the work to Skagens Museum where it is now part of the collection.
