= Nicoline Tuxen =

Danish painter (1847–1931)

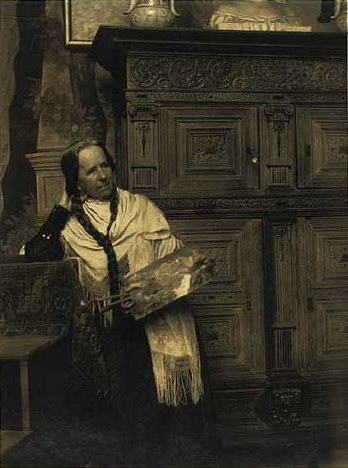
- Nicoline Tuxen
- Born: 14 November 1847; Copenhagen, Denmark
- Died: 5 April 1931 (aged 83); Frederiksberg, Denmark
- Occupation: Painter

Bertha Nicoline Tuxen (14 November 1847 – 5 April 1931) was a Danish painter of still lifes, flowers, and portraits.

== Life ==
Nicoline Tuxen was a daughter of the naval officer and director of the Orlogsværftet Nicolai Elias Tuxen (1810-1891) and his wife Bertha Laura Giødvad (1815-1908). Her younger brother was the sculptor and painter Laurits Tuxen. Since women were not allowed to study at the Royal Danish Academy of Fine Arts before 1888, she took lessons with Vilhelm Kyhn at his private drawing school for women (Tegneskolen for Kvinder), which existed between 1865 and 1895. Several study trips led her later to Paris. In 1891 she was awarded the Neuhausen Prize (De Neuhausenske Præmier) and in 1893 with a scholarship from the Royal Academy.

Nicoline Tuxen was regularly represented at the prestigious Charlottenborg Spring Exhibition (Forårsudstilling) in Copenhagen from the middle of the 1880s. Further exhibitions with her participation were, for example, the Palace of Fine Arts at the 1893 World's Columbian Exposition in Chicago, Illinois., an exhibition in Antwerp 1894 and the "Nordische Kunstausstellung" Lübeck 1895. She mainly painted flower pictures and still life, in later years also portraits. Their works bear the unmistakable stamp of the Danish Golden Age of painting.

Nicoline Tuxen remained unmarried, she died in Frederiksberg at the age of 83 and was buried at the Holmens Cemetery in Copenhagen.

== Gallery ==
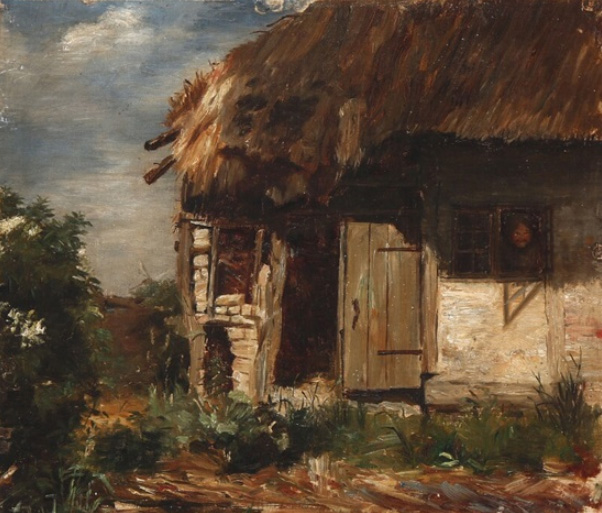
Nicoline Tuxen An old cottage in Østofte

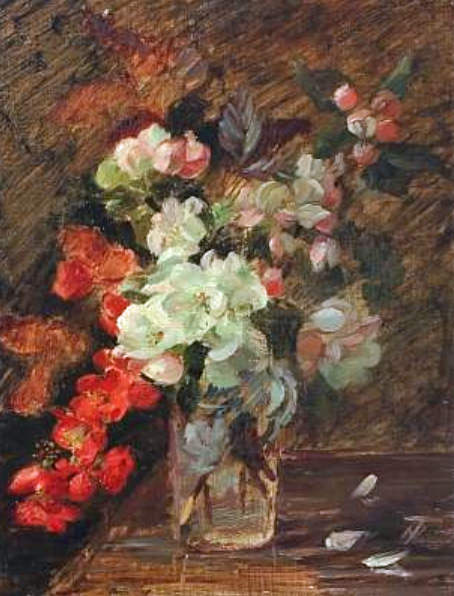
Nicoline Tuxen Still life with branches in bloom

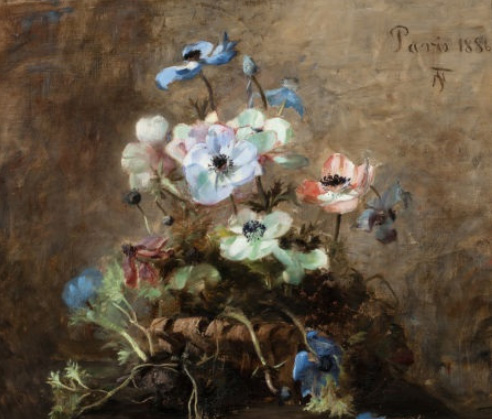
Nicoline Tuxen Flowers, 1886

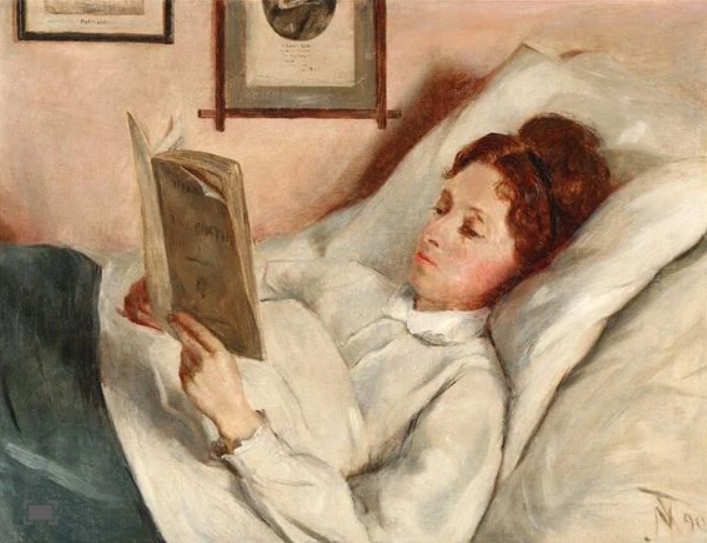
Nicoline Tuxen Portrait of a woman reading in bed
