= Group 4 (company) =

Security business in the United Kingdom

- Type: Private
- Industry: Security
- Founded: 1968
- Defunct: 2000
- Fate: Merged with Falck
- Successor: G4S
- Headquarters: London, England
- Key people: Jörgen Philip-Sörensen, (Chairman)

Group 4 was a security business operating primarily in the United Kingdom and latterly worldwide. The company was established in 1968, bringing together four British security businesses. It was involved in a series of controversies, including prisoner escapes, in the 1990s.

== History ==
The company was established by Swedish businessman Jörgen Philip-Sörensen, as a division of Securitas AB in 1968. The name derives from the fact that it brought together four different British security businesses into a single entity which became known as Group 4 Total Security and which was demerged from Securitas AB in 1981. Following the decision by the British Government in 1993 to enter into a contract with Group 4 to provide security for prisons, the company was embarrassed after a series of security blunders, including escaped prisoners. It merged with Falck Securitas, a subsidiary of the Danish security business Falck, in June 2000 to form Group 4 Falck.

== Controversies ==
=== 1993 prisoner escapes in the United Kingdom ===
In April 1993, Group 4 held what was described by the Independent as a "carefully stage-managed press conference" to resolve public relations problems after four prisoners were lost in the first seven days of their contract to transport prisoners to courts. Shortly after the press conference it was revealed a further two had been lost.

The Campsfield House detention facility, which was near Oxford, had seen hunger strikes and rioting that resulted in a mass escape over the perimeter fence shortly after it opened in 1993. Just one year after then-Labour home affairs spokesperson Tony Blair declared that a "comedy of errors" was occurring within Group 4, a hunger striker who had been admitted to hospital from the Campsfield House detention centre managed to escape while being transported by Group 4 security officers. The centre suffered further controversy in 1998, when prisoner John Quahquah and eight others were acquitted of charges of rioting and disorder after it was proved that evidence provided by staff was false and unreliable; the centre was shut by David Blunkett in 2002.

In March 2000, six Romanian immigrants absconded from Oakington Immigration Reception Centre, then run by Group 4. Twelve asylum seekers absconded from the same centre in 2003 by scaling the perimeter fence and vanishing into the night.

Three prisoners also escaped from Peterborough Crown Court in 2001 after attacking Group 4 security officers and locking them in a cell and later on that year a vehicle transferring prisoners from Cambridge to Bedford prison crashed, resulting in the escape of 20-year-old Rodney Buckley.
