= Julius Paulsen =

Danish artist (1860–1940)

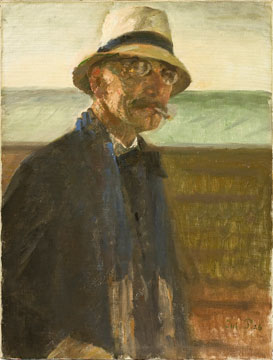
Julius Paulsen, self-portrait

Julius Paulsen (22 October 1860 in Odense – 17 February 1940 in Copenhagen) was a Danish painter. From 1879 to 1882 he studied at the Royal Danish Academy of Fine Arts where he was later a professor. He had strong connections with several of the Skagen Painters and visited Skagen in the early 1900s. Paulsen was influenced by Rembrandt and French salon art. He is remembered above all for his portraits.

== Early life and education ==
Born in Odense, Paulsen was the son of a shopkeeper. After completing an apprenticeship as a house painter, he attended the Royal Danish Academy of Fine Arts, graduating in 1882. In 1885, he travelled to the Netherlands, France and Belgium together with Viggo Johansen.

== Career ==
Paulsen's works bear the influence of Realism, Symbolism and Impressionism but he was also inspired by Dutch 17th century art as can be seen in his painting Portrætgruppe (Portrait Group) from 1902 in Skagens Museum. Paulsen also associated with several of the Skagen Painters who gathered each summer in the north of Jutland but did not visit Skagen itself until after 1900. He painted several portraits of Laurits Tuxen and his family as well as a number of landscapes. His portrait of P.S. Krøyer hangs in the Museum of National History in Frederiksborg Palace.

From 1908 to 1920, Paulsen was a professor at the Royal Danish Academy. His work was part of the painting event in the art competition at the 1932 Summer Olympics.

== Selected paintings ==
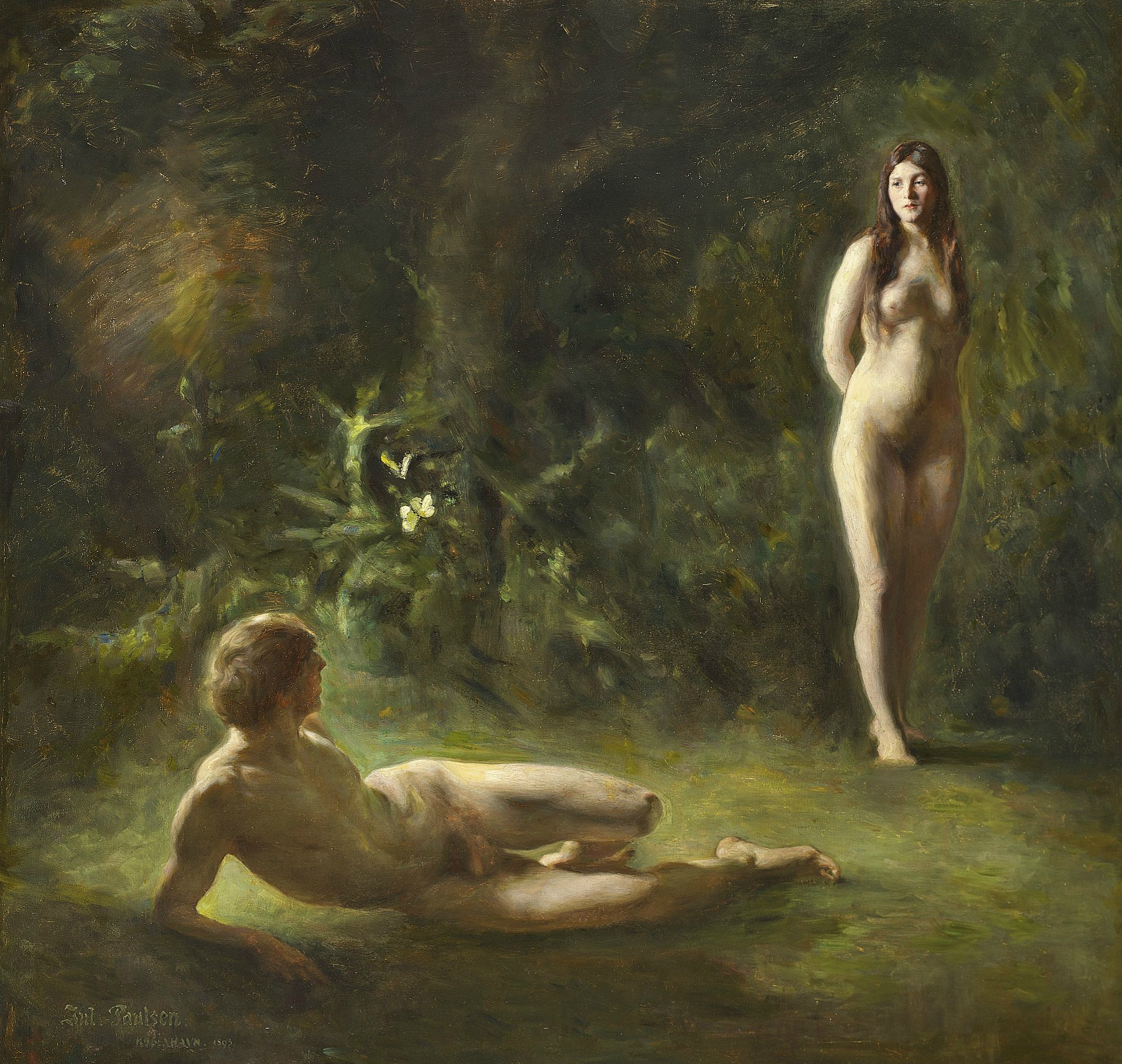
Adam and Eve

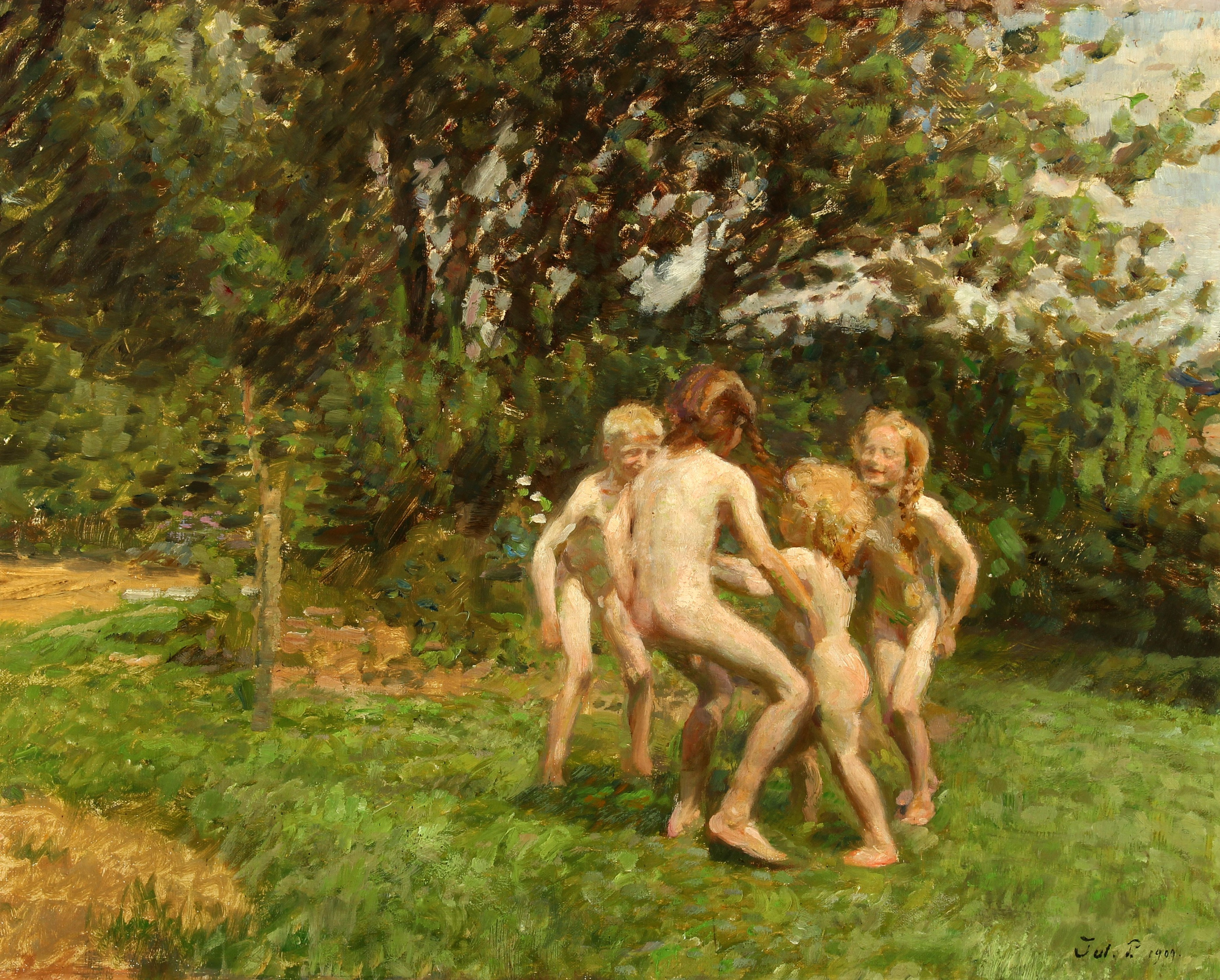
Round dance in Græsted

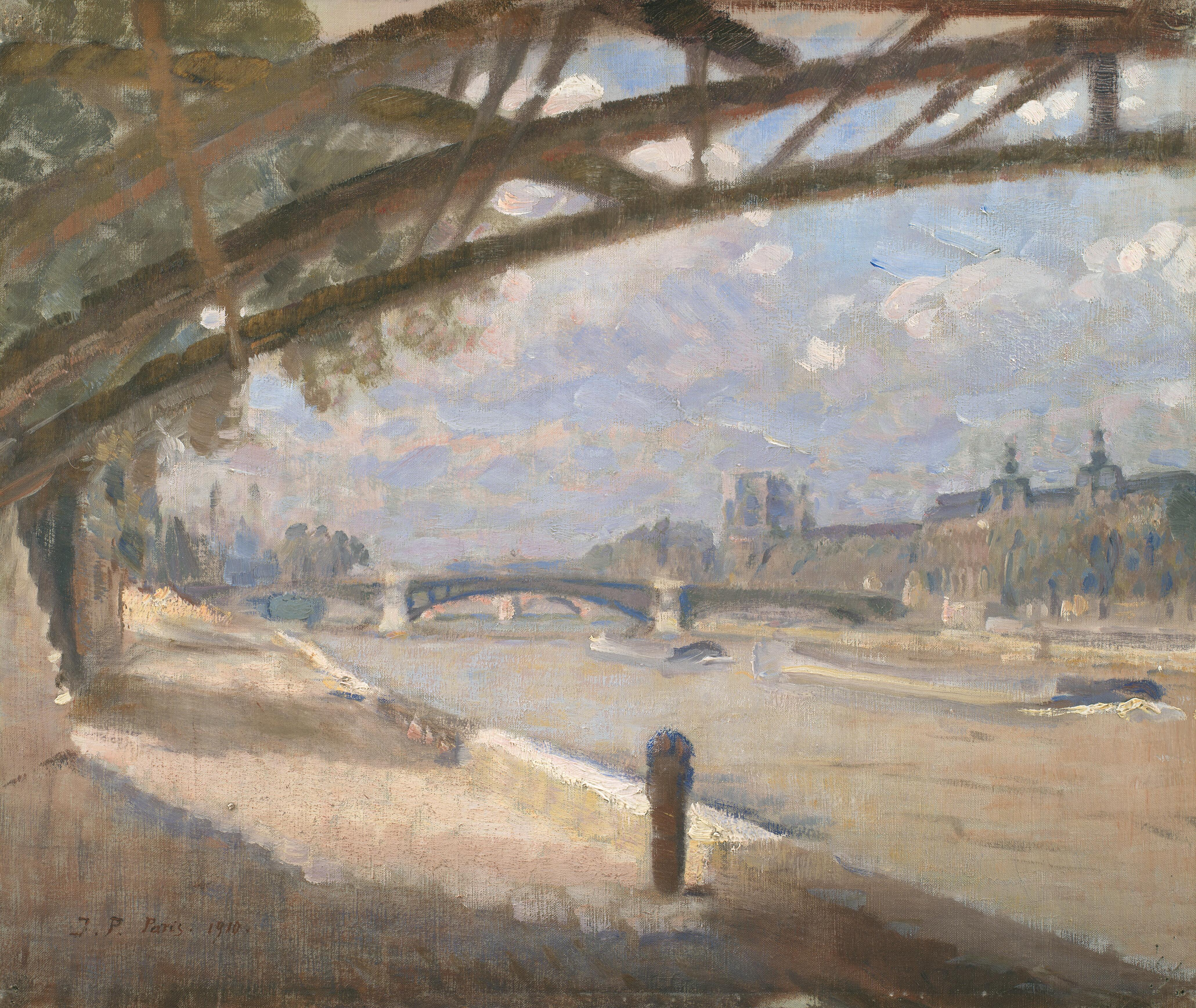
Under the Pont des Arts

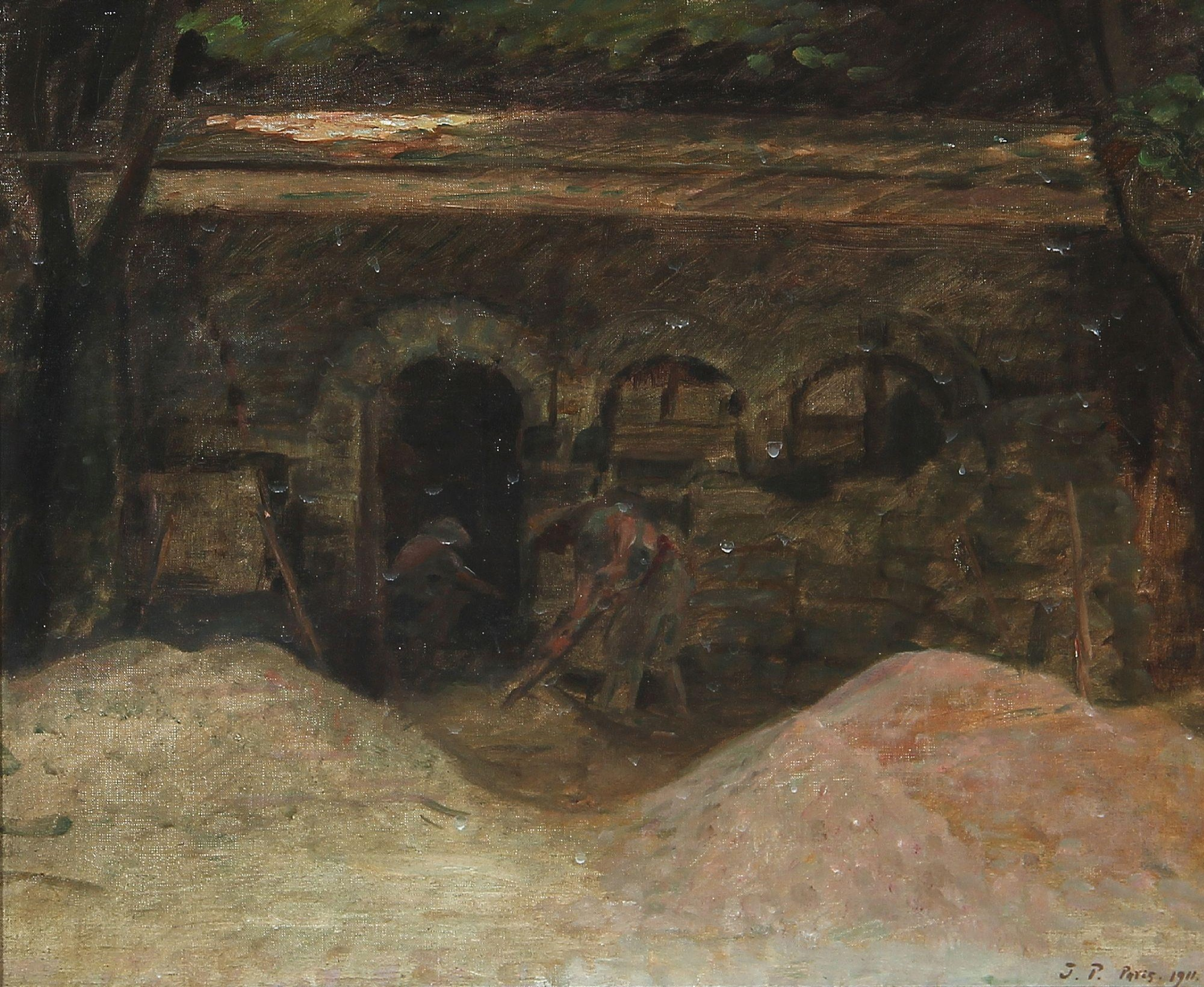
Workmen at a Home in Paris

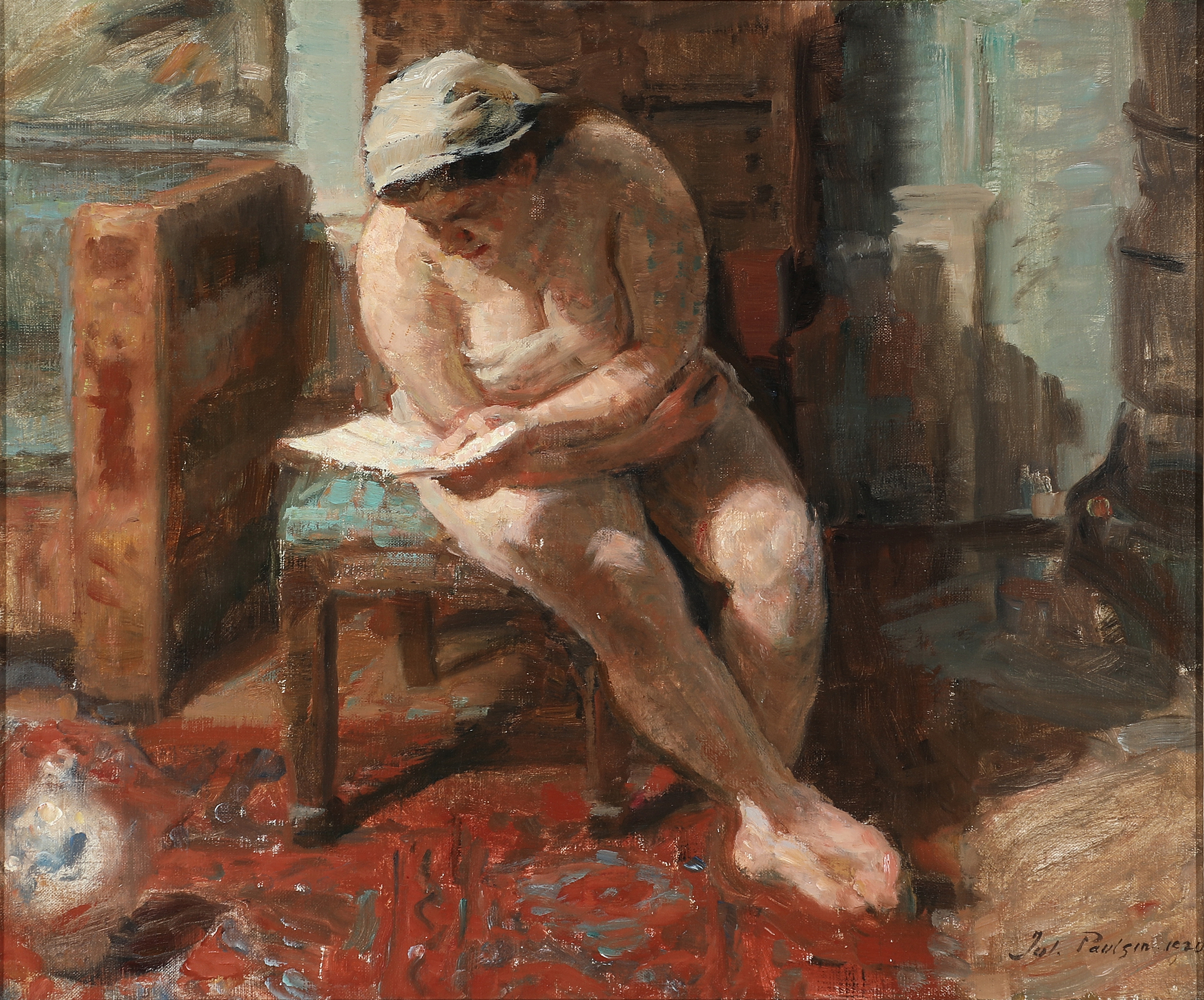
Half-nude Model, Reading

== Literature ==
- Wolsgaard Iversen, Anne Cathrine (2002). Julius Paulsen. Ordrupgaard. ISBN 978-87-88692-32-7.
