= Ruth's Hotel =

Hotel in Gammel Skagen, Denmark

Coordinates: 57°43′37″N 10°31′18″E

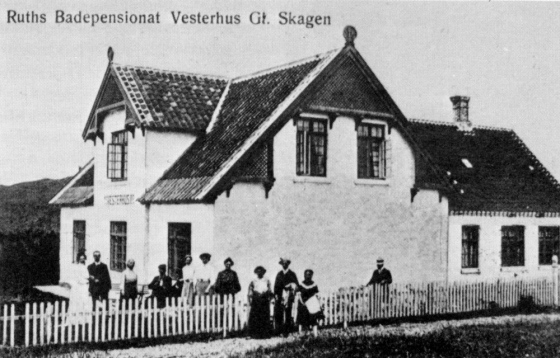
Ruth's Hotel, c. 1910

Ruth's Hotel (Danish: Ruths Hotel) is a historic hotel in the Højen district of Skagen in the far North of Jutland, Denmark. Named after its founders, Emma and Hans Christian Ruth, who opened it as Badepensionat Vesterhus in 1904, the establishment has now gained a reputation not only for comfort but for its French Brasserie restaurant run by Michel Michaud, said to be Skagen's best. Ruth's Hotel also contains a Gourmet Restaurant ("Ruths Gourmet") and a wellness center.

== History ==
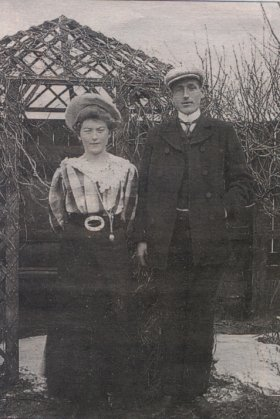
Dagmar Ruth and Olaf Dahler, February 1909

In 1891, Hans Christian Ruth built a house in Højen (also known as Old Skagen). An extension was added on the east side in 1909, with 12 rooms to be used as guest-house accommodation. A further enlargement followed in 1912, with 18 bedrooms and in 1928 an additional floor was added to house bedrooms. In an attempt to attract painters, another extension was completed with rooms and a studio. Major alterations to the central section were completed in 1919 with a concert room, a dining room and a pantry.

Hans Christian Ruth was among those who participated in an attempt to save the crew of the Norwegian brig Speed when it was wrecked of the Skagen coast in a wintry storm in January 1909. The only survivor of the crew of eight was Johan Olaf Dahler, who was brought back to the hotel where a romance ensued with Ruth's daughter Dagmar. The couple were married in 1912 and went on to become hoteliers themselves, caring for Ruth's Hotel for over 60 years.

In 2003, the hotel was purchased by Swedish businessman Jörgen Philip-Sörensen, and Chef Michel Michaud arrived at the hotel the following year. In 2015, Ruths Brasserie is still with a classic French à la carte menu though Ruths Gourmet is with Nordic cuisine and now head chef Dennis Juhl is in charge of the gastronomic part of Ruth's Hotel.

== Bibliography ==
- Bain, Carolyn; Bonetto, Cristian; Stone, Andrew (1 June 2012). Lonely Planet Denmark. Lonely Planet. ISBN 978-1-74321-287-5.
- Jensen, Birthe (2011). Sweet on Denmark. Images Publishing. ISBN 978-1-86470-350-4.
- Moltke-Leth, Edit; Henriksen, Poul Ib; Michaud, Michel (2007). Ruths Hotel & Michel Michaud. Bonniers Bogklubber. ISBN 978-87-604-2890-6.
- Porter, Darwin; Prince, Danforth; Norum, Roger (15 June 2011). Frommer's Scandinavia. John Wiley & Sons. ISBN 978-1-118-09023-7.
- https://www.ruths-hotel.dk/en/about-ruths/the-history-of-ruths-hotel/
