= Laurits Tuxen =

Danish painter (1853–1927)

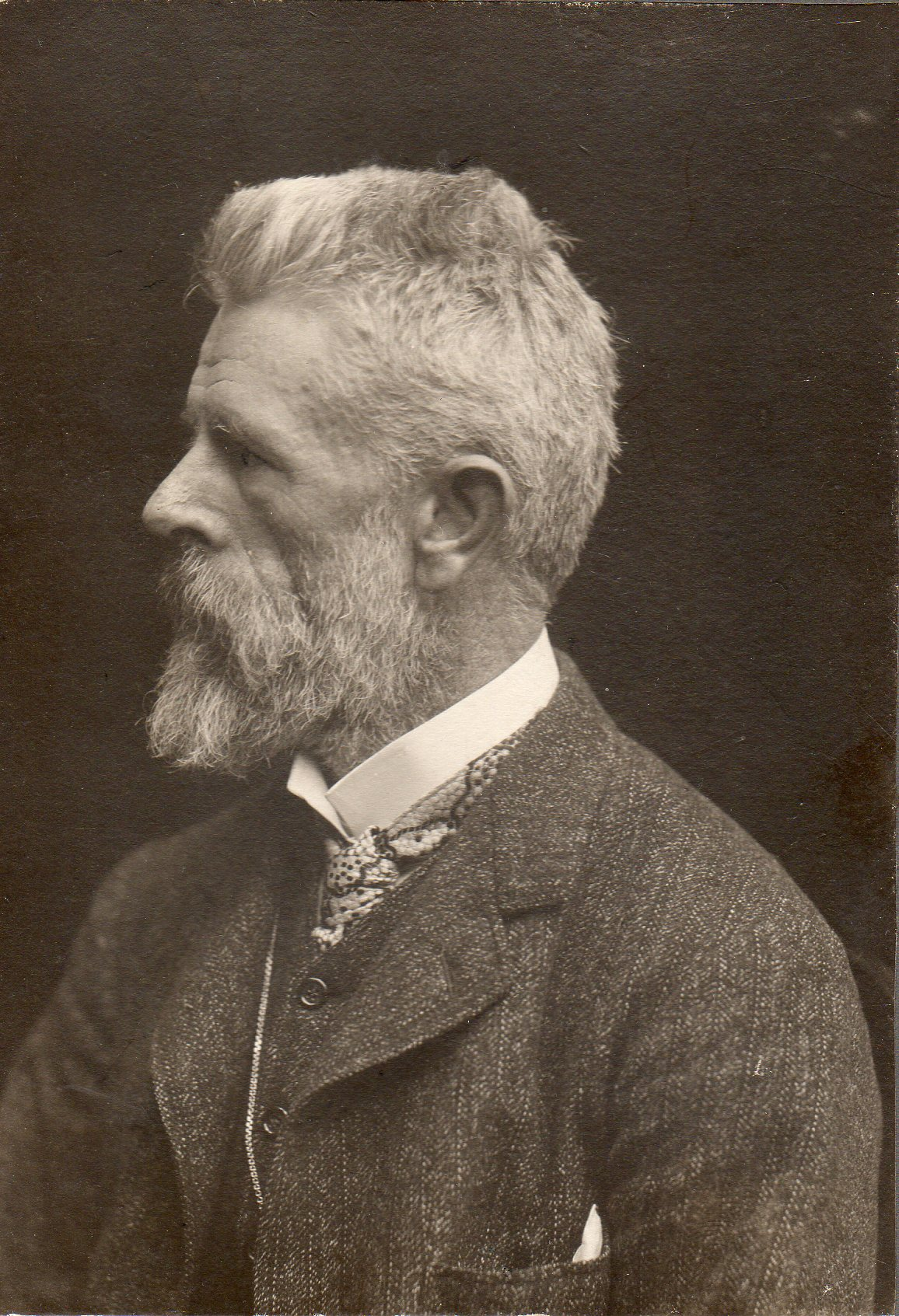
- Photograph by Frederik Riise
- Born: 9 December 1853; Copenhagen, Denmark
- Died: 21 November 1927 (aged 73); Copenhagen, Denmark
- Education: Royal Danish Academy of Fine Arts
- Known for: Painting
- Movement: Skagen painters, Realism

Laurits Regner Tuxen CVO (9 December 1853 – 21 November 1927) was a Danish painter and sculptor specialising in figure painting. He was also associated with the Skagen Painters. He was the first head of Kunstnernes Frie Studieskoler, an art school established in the 1880s to provide an alternative to the education offered by the Royal Danish Academy of Fine Arts.

== Biography ==
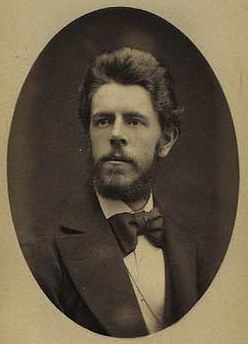
Youth portrait of Laurits Tuxen, by E. Buizard (1870)

Lauritz Regner Tuxen grew up in Copenhagen, Denmark. He was the son of Nicolai Elias Tuxen (1810–1891) and Bertha Laura Giødvad (1815–1908). His father was a naval officer and director of the Danish naval shipyard (Orlogsværftet). The still life-and flowerpainter Nicoline Tuxen (1847–1931) was his older sister.

From 1868 to 1872, he studied at the Royal Danish Academy of Art together with Peder Severin Krøyer (1851–1909). He studied in the Paris studio of Léon Bonnat during 1875–1876 and again from 1877 to 1878.

He first visited Skagen in 1870, returning on several occasions. In the 1880s and 1890s, he travelled widely painting portraits for Europe's royal families including Christian IX of Denmark, Queen Victoria and the Russian royalty.

Kunstnernes Frie Studieskoler was founded in Copenhagen during 1882, at the initiative of a group of dissatisfied students from the Royal Academy of Fine Arts and as a reaction to the outdated teachings at the Academy. Laurits Tuxen became the school's first director and Peder Severin Krøyer one of its teachers.

In 1914 he made a study trip to Greece to paint the entry of George I of Greece into Salonika, for the Christian castle. He made lively and well-characterized portraits, among them his self-portrait in the Uffizi Gallery in Florence, and portraits of P. S. Krøyer, in the Museum of Fine Arts in Budapest. He also made portraits in sculpture, including a portrait group of Krøyer and Michael Ancher. Tuxen went on to paint a number of landscapes in and around Skagen, but also completed a number of paintings of his family, friends and garden flowers.

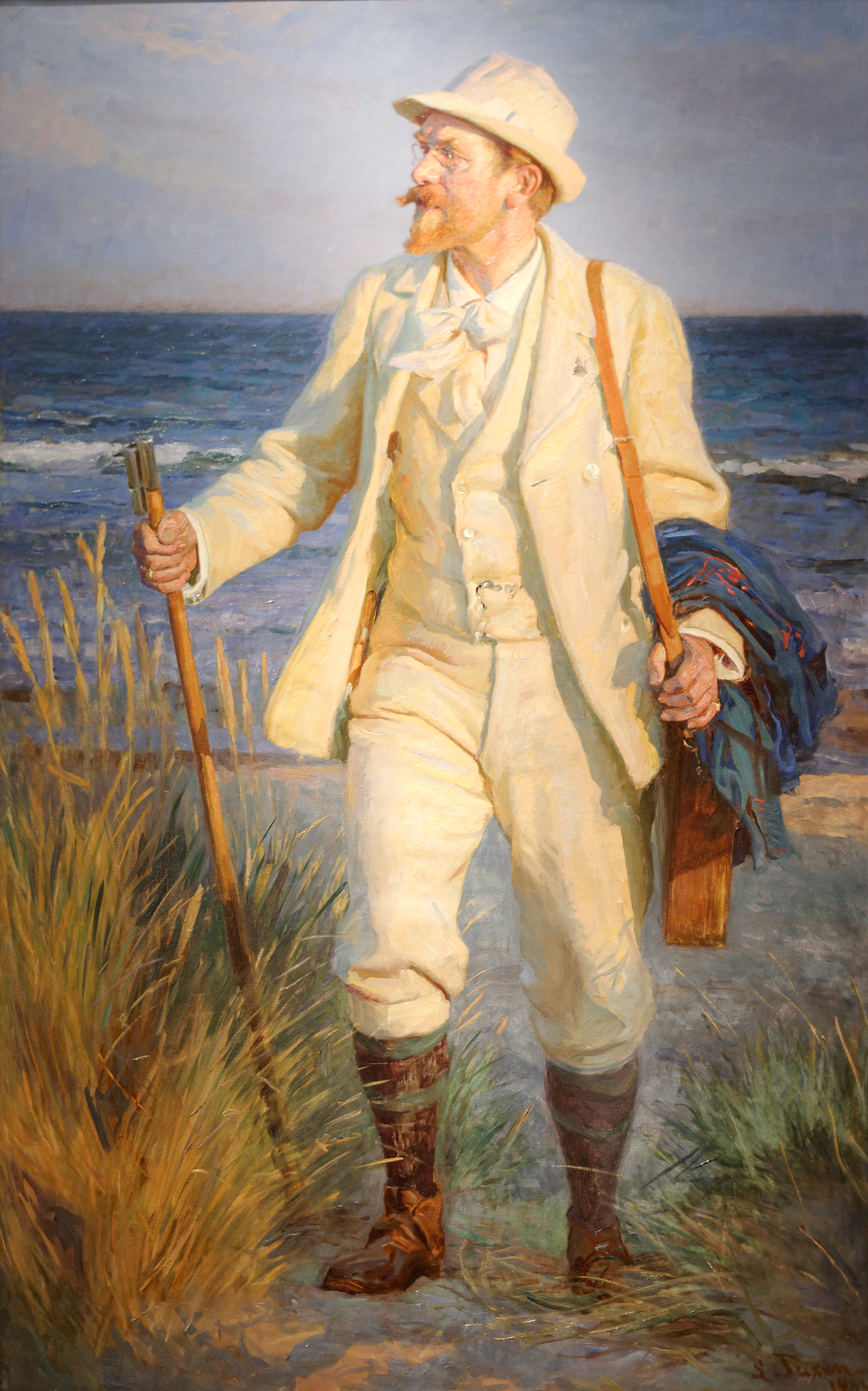
Portrait of Peder Severin Krøyer by Laurits Tuxen

== Personal life ==
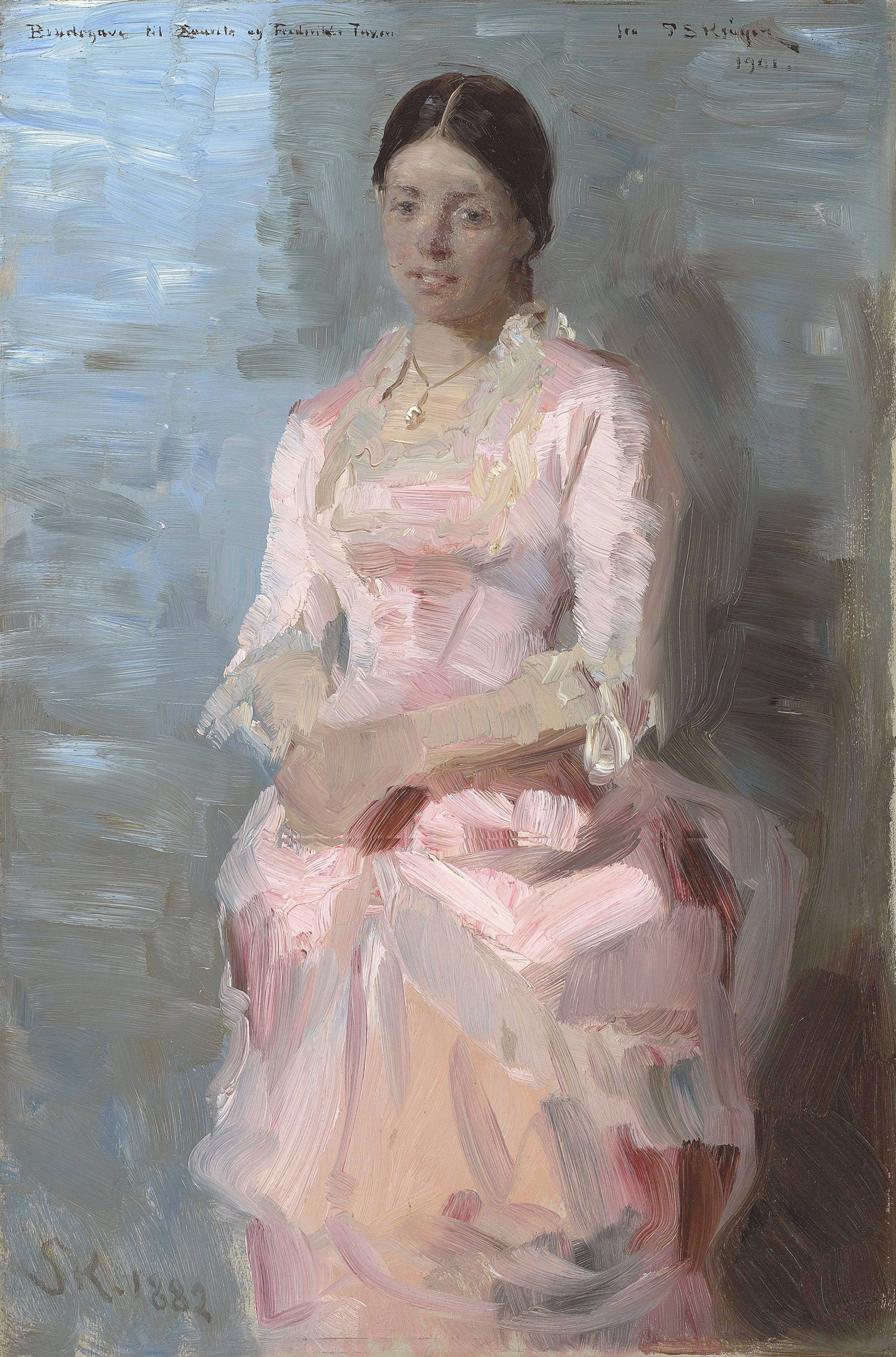
Frederikke Tuxen (1882), by P. S. Krøyer

He was married in 1886 to Charlotte Pauline Ursule de Baisieux (1862–1899). They had two daughters, Nina Tuxen (1898–1982) and Yvonne Tuxen (1894–1987). In 1901, after the death of his first wife, he married Frederikke Kos Treschow (1856–1946).

Through Yvonne, his great-great-grandson is the programmer David Heinemeier Hansson.

He subsequently purchased Madam Bendsen's house in Skagen in the north of Jutland, converting it into a stately summer residence.

He died in 1927 at Copenhagen.

== Exhibitions ==
Tuxen painted mainly landscapes in Skagen, but also portraits of European royal personalities, namely Christian IX of Denmark, Queen Victoria, Czar Nicolas II, etc. Some of his works are exhibited at:

- The Hermitage in St. Petersburg.
- The Royal Collection of England.
- Ny Carlsberg Glyptotek in Copenhagen.
- Statens Museum for Kunst in Copenhagen.
- Skagens Museum in Skagen, Denmark.

In 2014, Skagens Museum held the first major exhibition of Tuxen's works for 25 years titled "Farver, friluft og fyrster" (Colour, Countryside and Crown).

== Gallery ==
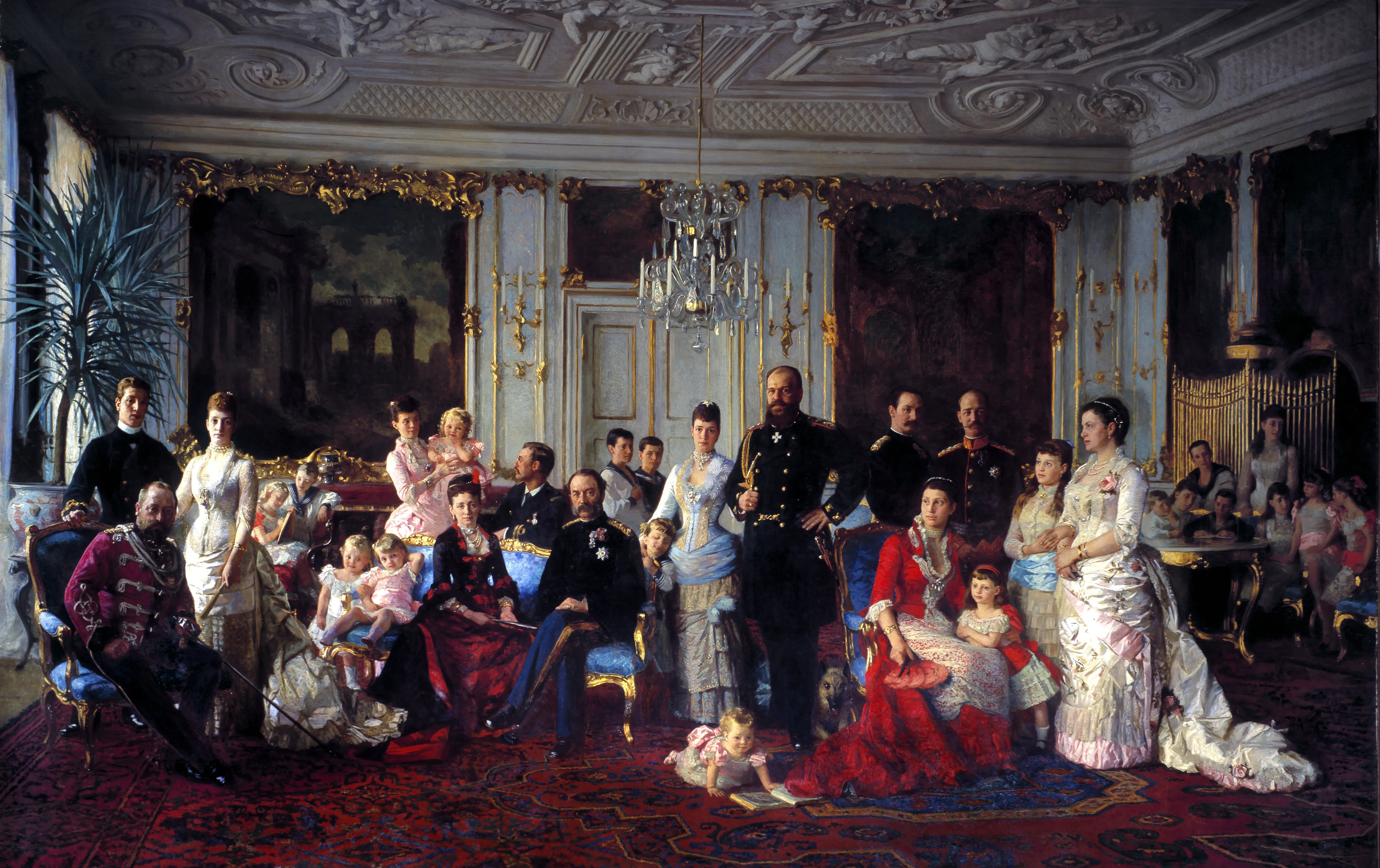
King Christian IX of Denmark with family (1886)

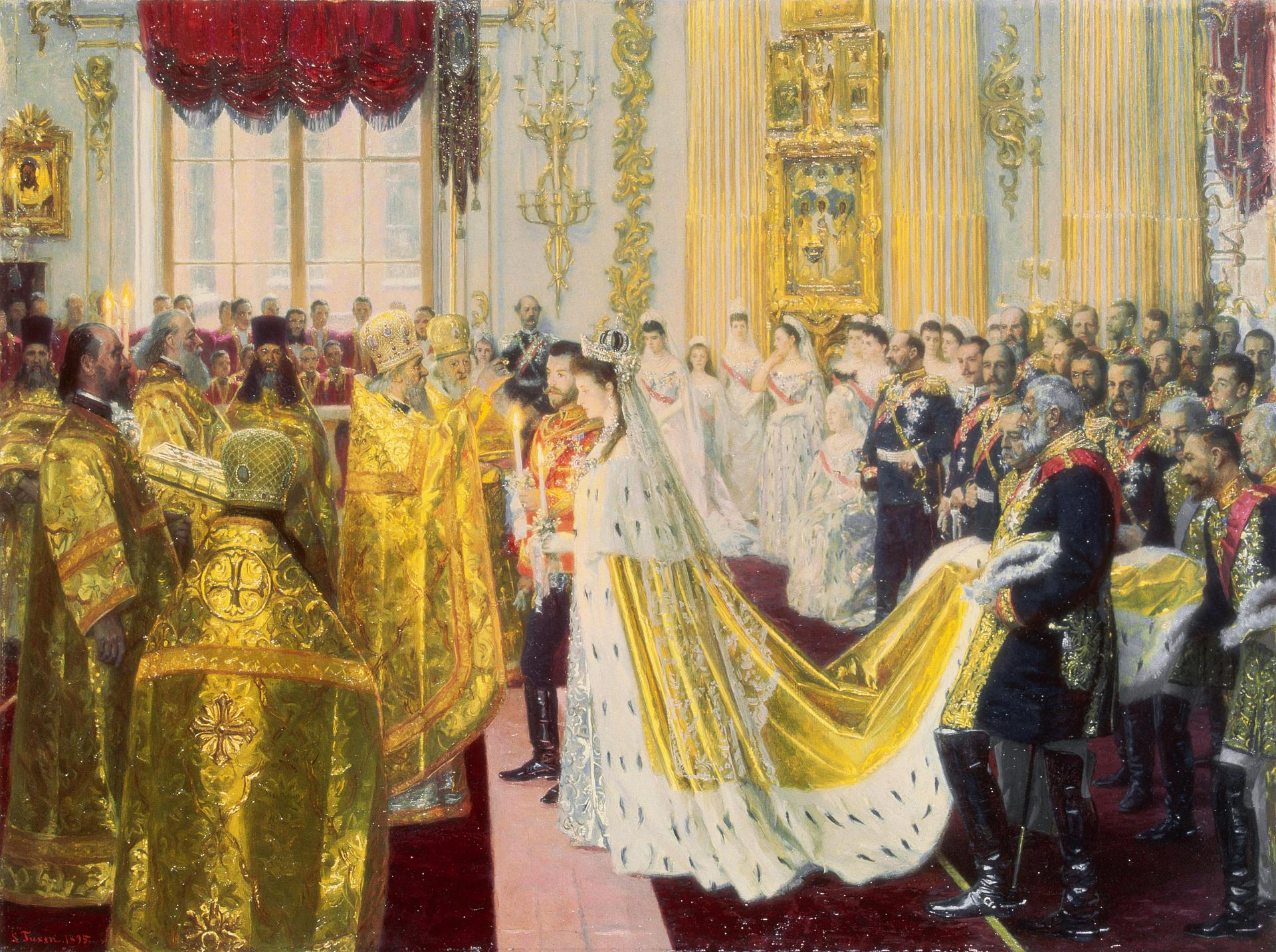
The Wedding of Tsar Nicholas II (1895)

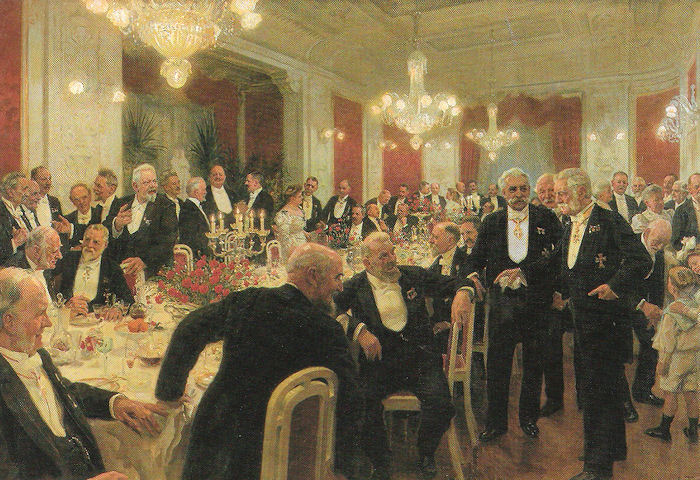
Leaving the Table (1906)

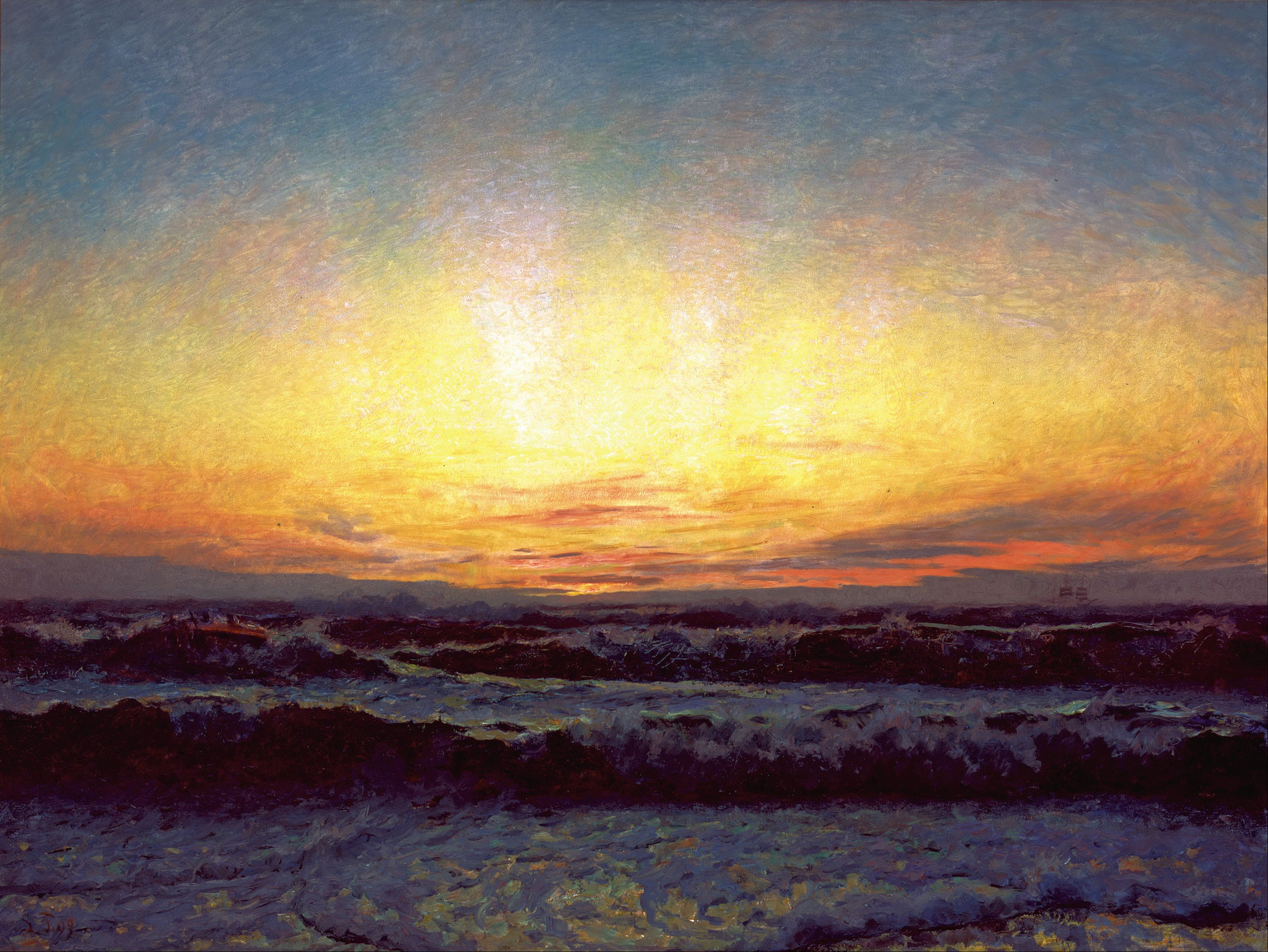
The North Sea in Stormy Weather After Sunset. Højen (1909)

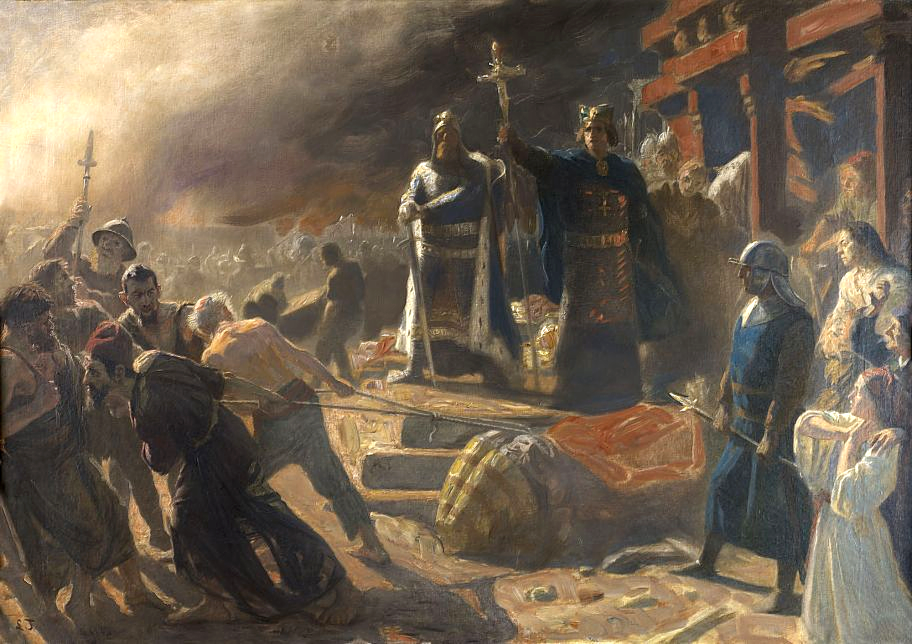
Bishop Absalon topples
the god Svantevit at Cape Arkona

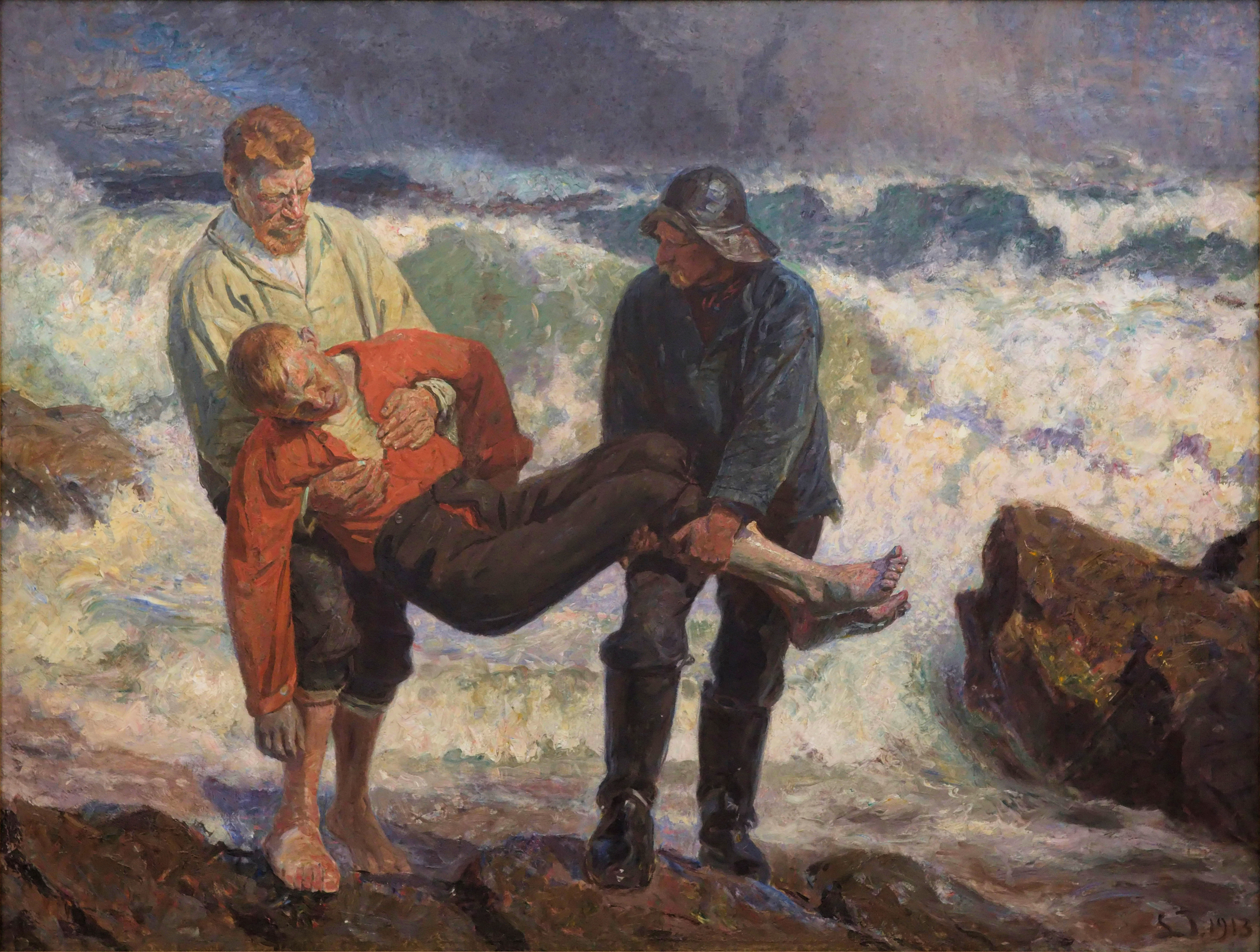
The drowned is carried ashore (1913)

== See also ==
- Skagen Painters
- Art of Denmark
- The North Sea in Stormy Weather
- Evening Party in the Studio on Strandvejen

== Literature ==
- Jensen, Mette Bøgh; Fabienke, Tine Nielsen (2014). Tuxen. Colour, Countryside and Crown. Skagens Museum. ISBN 978-87-91048-33-3.
- Svanholm, Lise (1990). Laurits Tuxen: Europas sidste fyrstemaler; en monografi (in Danish). Gyldendal. ISBN 978-87-00-96762-5.
