= Johan Cornelius Tuxen =

Royal Danish Navy officer, politician and writer (1820–1883)

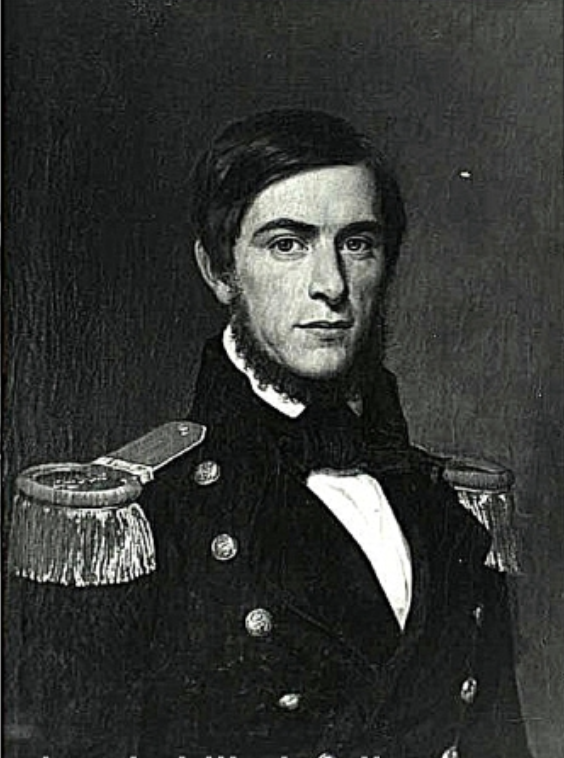
- Born: May 12, 1820; Copenhagen, Denmark
- Died: January 29, 1883 (aged 62); Copenhagen, Denmark
- Burial place: Cemetery of Holmen, Copenhagen
- Military career
- Allegiance: Denmark
- Branch: Royal Danish Navy
- Rank: Captain

Captain Johan Cornelius Tuxen (12 May 1820 – 29 January 1883) was a Royal Danish Navy officer, politician and writer. He was a member of the Folketing from 1864 to 1879.

== Early life ==
Tuxen was born in Copenhagen, the son of first lieutenant and later captain commander Peter M. Tuxen (1783–1838) and Elisabeth M. Simonsen (1786–1867).

== Naval career ==
Tuxen became a cadet in 1834 and a second lieutenant with Gerner's Medal in 1840. In 1840–1841, he served aboard the brig Aliart in the Danish West Indies. The ship grounded at Puerto Rico and he later received a sentence for dereliction of duties from the Generalkrigsretten. In 1843–1844, he served aboard the brig Ørnen on an expedition to South America. In 1845, he was decommissioned from service to command the civilian steamer Frederik VI in domestic waters.

He also studied mathematics, navigation, natural sciences and history. From 1848 to 1867, he served as a teacher in mathematics and navigation at the Naval Cadet Academy.

During the First Schleswig War, in 1849, now with the rank of first lieutenant, he served aboard the corvette Diana. He later served on a naval training ship. He reached the rank of lieutenant in 1858 and captain lieutenant in 1861.

During the Second Schleswig War, in 1864, he was commander of the schooner Diana in the North Sea. He reached the rank of captain in 1868. In 1871, he commanded the schooner Fylla in an expedition to Iceland and the Faroe Islands. In 1875, he was decommissioned from the Navy with the rank of commander due to poor health.

== Politics ==
From 1864 to 1879, Tuxen was a member of the Folketinget. He was elected in Copenhagen's 9th Constituency and represented Højre. In 1866–1867, he was also a member of the Copenhagen City Council, and from 1867 to 1883 a member of the Port Council (Havnerådet). From 1872 to 1881, he was a member of Frederiksberg Municipal Council.

== Other occupations ==
Tuxen was a co-founder of Foreningen til søfartens fremme. He was a board member from 1849 and its president from 1858 to 1879. From 1856 to 1864, he was editor-in-chief of Tidsskrift for Søvæsen. For a while he also served as vice-president of Industriforeningen.

Tuxen was also a prolific writer. His books included Den danske og norske sømagt fra de ældste Tider indtil vore Dage (1875) and Søfarten og Skibsbygningskunsten (1879). Together with his brother, Georg Emil Tuxen, he also published a text book in Navigation (Lærebog i Navigationen med tilhørende Tabeller, 1856).

== Personal life ==
Tuxen married twice. His first wife was Wilhelmine Augusta Tegner (1822–1848), daughter of merchant and lieutenant Martin Peter Tegner (1796–1825) and Johanne Cecilie Cathrine Christophersen (1802–1875). They were married on 17 April 1847 in the Church of Holmen in Copenhagen. His second wife was Elise Rosalie Christence Bernhoft (1827–1895), a daughter of bureau chief Hans Lassenius B. (1793–1851) and Hermine Andrea Bentzen (1799–1874). They were married on 2 April 1853 in Kristiania. Tuxen died on 29 January 1883 and is buried in the Cemetery of Holmen. He was survived by the following children:

- August Martin Julius Tuxen (1848–1911), surveyor in Australia
- Jean Charles Tuxen (1854–1927), Director of the Royal Naval Dockyards, chamberlain
- Hans Lassenius Herman Tuxen (1856–1910), Lieutenant Colonel, Director of the Army Technical Corps
- Peter Vilhelm Tuxen (1857–1913), surveyor in Australia
- Vigand Knud Tuxen (1859–1902), engineer in Northern Norway
- Marie Benedicte Tuxen (1860–1952). owner of Tybjerggaard
- Johan Edvin Tuxen (1862–1864)
- Ludvig Christian Tuxen (1864–1918), surveyor in Australia
- Alexander Holst Tuxen (1865–1907), engineer
- Theodor Tuxen (1867–1867)
- Johanne Elise Tuxen (1868–1935), hospital manager
- Eivin Theodor Tuxen (1870–1913), master mason in Australia
- Hermine Andrea Bernhoft Tuxen (1873–1933), music teacher

== Honors ==
- 1856: Order of the Dannebrog
- 1865: Dannebrogsmand
- 1879: Commander of the Order of the Dannebrog
