= Højen =

Coordinates: 57°43′41″N 10°31′27″E

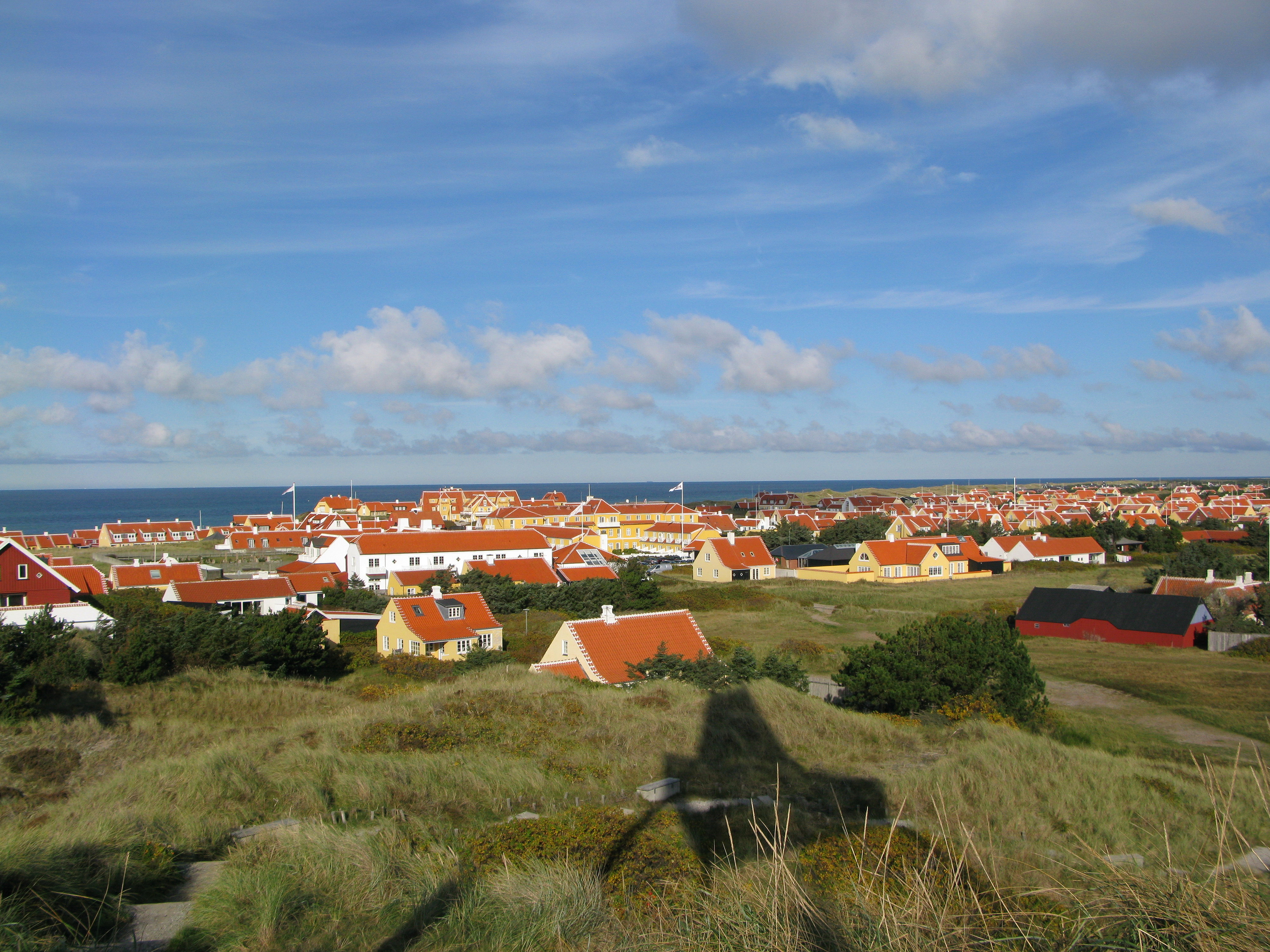
Højen

Højen or Gammel Skagen on the west side of Skagen Odde is an old fishing community which now forms part of the town of Skagen in the far north of Jutland, Denmark. It has a permanent population of about 30.

Højen was first settled in the 12th century, and by the 15th century had become a populated fishing hamlet. By the late 19th century, the village was a popular tourist destination. Today, Højen suffers from coastal erosion and drifting sand, though its fishing cottages and beaches continue to attract tourists.

== History ==
The first building in the Skagen area was built in Højen in the 12th century. It belonged to the shepherd Tronder who became the first of Skagen's fishermen. Højen was the largest community on the peninsula until about 1340 when it was overtaken by what is now Skagen's Vesterby. The first documented reference to Højen occurred in the 15th century when it was a fishing hamlet. In 1884, a beacon was installed to guide mariners to the lighthouses on the tip of Skagen Odde. In 1892, a lighthouse was established in Højen itself, functioning until 1956 when it was replaced by Skagen West Lighthouse. It was demolished in 1956. A life-boat station was opened in Gammel Skagen in 1865. From the end of the 19th century, Højen became popular with tourists. In 1888, Rudolph Jeckel opened Jeckels Hotel and in 1904 today's Ruths Hotel was established by Hans Ruth as Vesterhus. Other small hotels opened later.

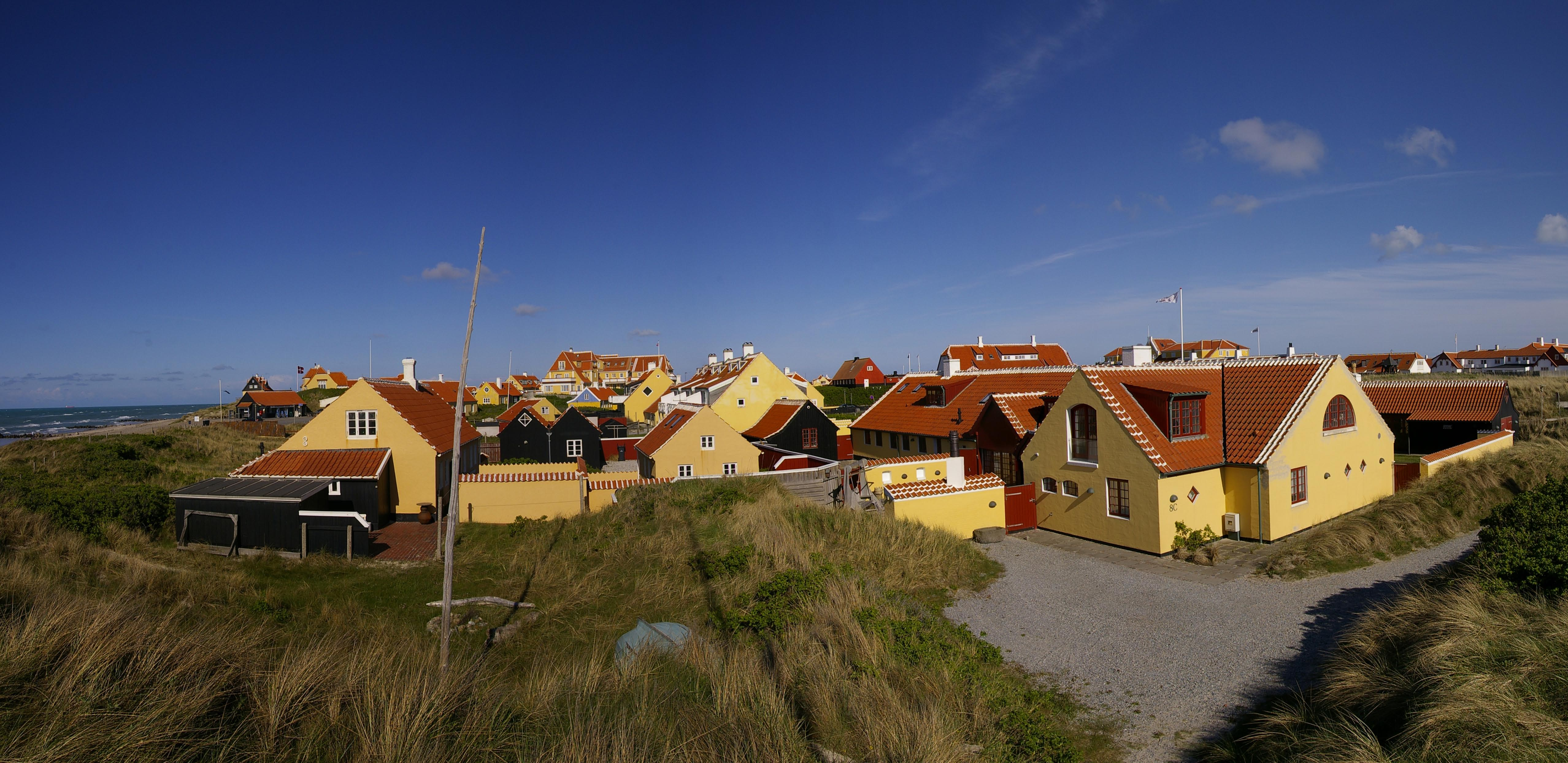
Højen's yellow-plastered houses with red roofs and white trimmings

Until 2005, Højen was a station on the Skagensbanen, the railway from Frederikshavn to Skagen which opened in 1890.

Over the years, the oldest parts of Højen have been destroyed by coastal erosion while the remaining area has suffered from the effects of drifting sand. There was once a thriving population of around 800 but this was reduced to only 30 a result of these difficulties. It maintains the unspoiled appearance of a 19th-century fishing village with many of the old fishermen's cottages. Tourists are attracted by the beaches of Nordstrand on the North Sea. The beach is good for bathing although it can be stony in places. The southern section is popular with naturists.

== Højen in art ==
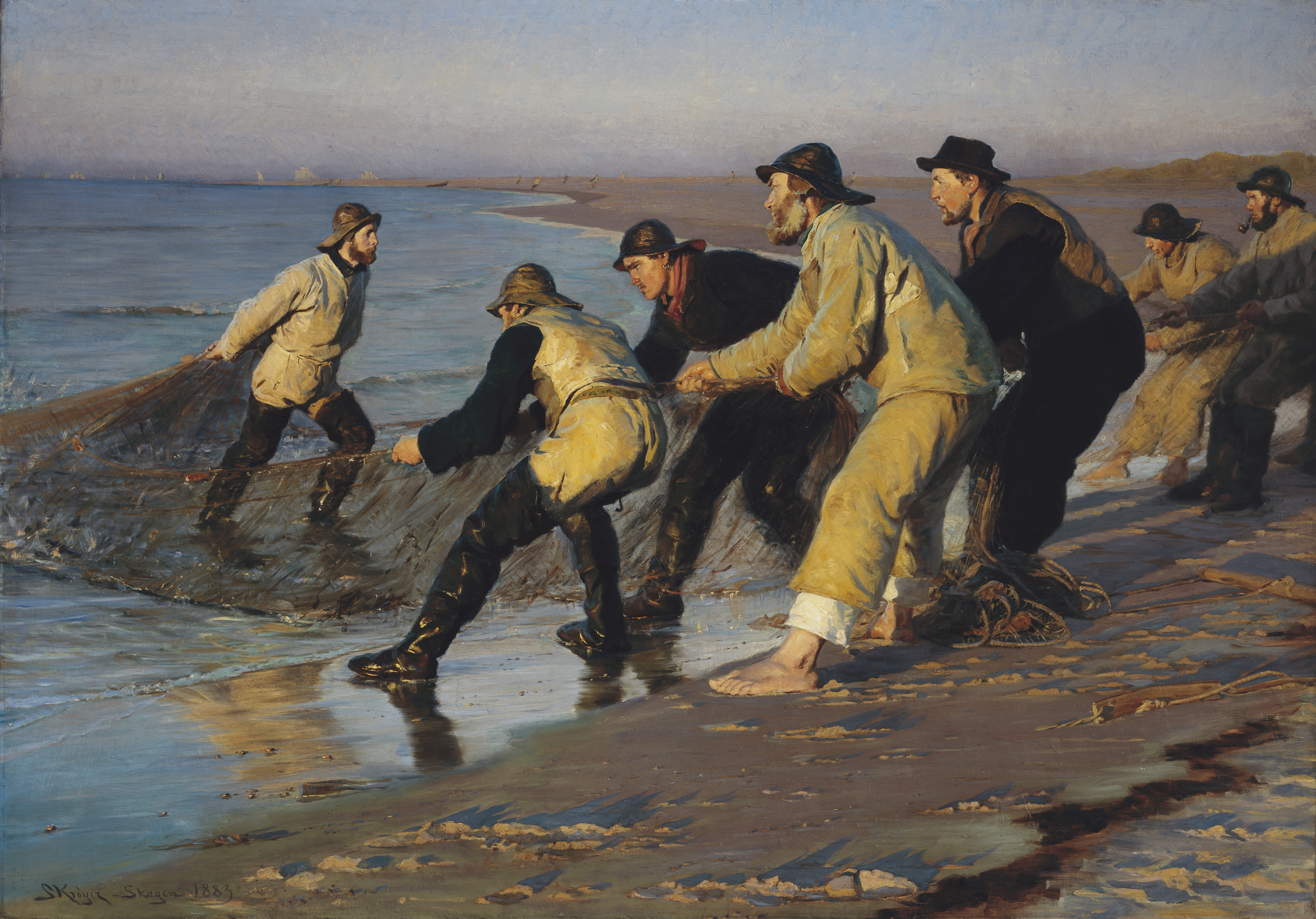
P.S. Krøyer: Fishermen hauling nets

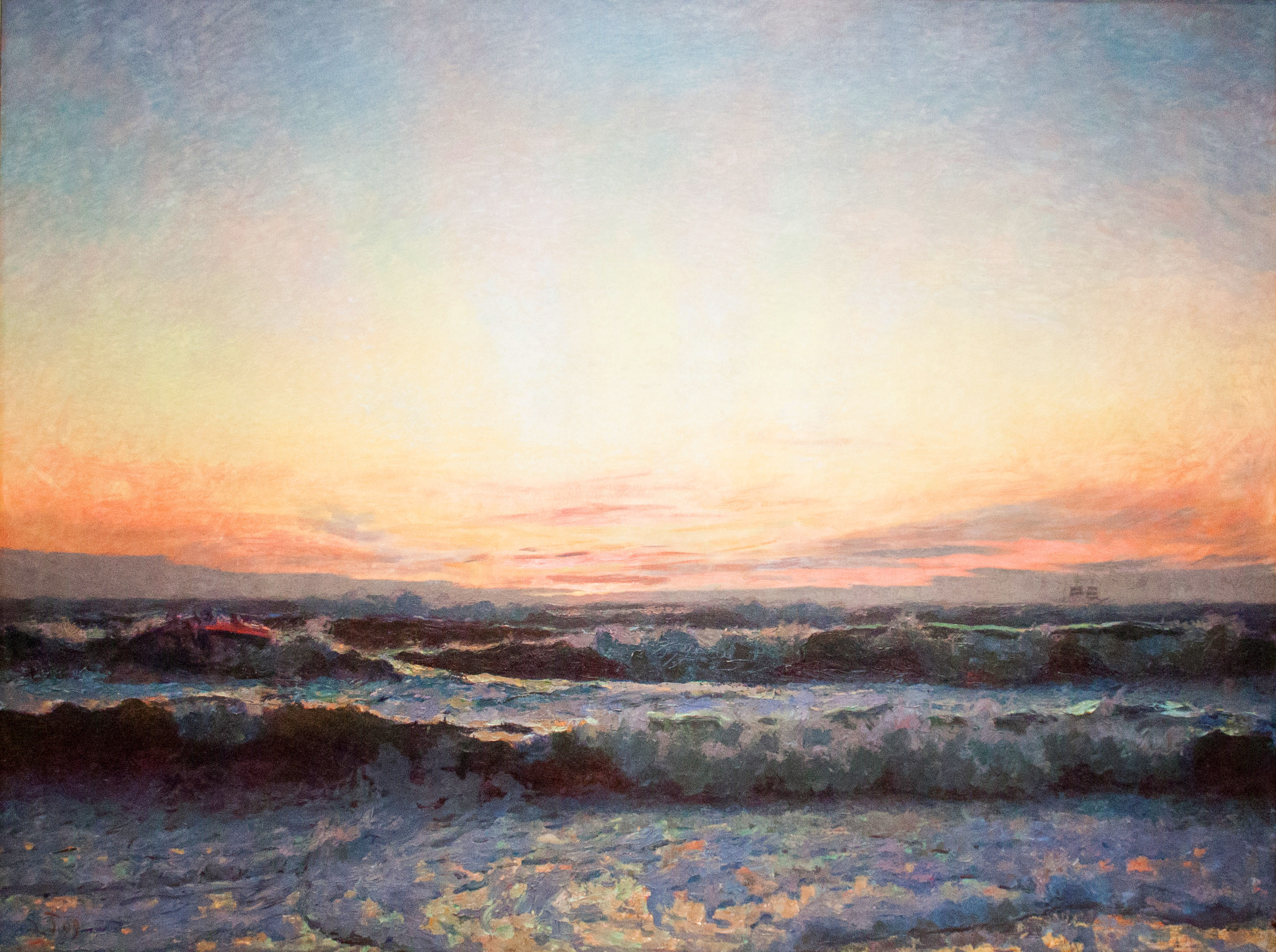
Laurits Tuxen: The North Sea in a storm

P.S. Krøyer, one of the Skagen Painters, produced a fine painting of fishermen on the beach at Højen. His "Fishermen hauling nets" (Krøyer fiskere trækker vod) was painted in 1883. In 1909, Laurits Tuxen painted a stormy sea at Højen.

== Literature ==
- Nielsen, Hans (2006). Højen på postkort: 109 kapitler af Gl. Skagens historie (in Danish). Skagen Lokalhistoriske Forening. ISBN 978-87-88602-12-8.
- Nielsen, Henrik Gjøde; Ax, Michael; Museumsrådet for Nordjyllands Amt (2002). Havets Nordjylland: museernes rejser gennem Nordjyllands kultur og historie (in Danish). Nordjyllands Amt. ISBN 978-87-7775-461-6.
- Qvistorff, Helge V. (1996). Nordjyllands kyster: kendte og ukendte (in Danish). Jysk Lokalhistorisk Forlag. ISBN 978-87-88293-27-2.
