= Catherine Chauvel =

French geochemist

- Born: December 27, 1955 (age 70)
- Education: University of Rennes (PhD)
- Scientific career
- Fields: Geochemistry
- Thesis: Géochimie isotopique (Nd, Sr) et géochimie des éléments, traces des basaltes alcalins du Massif Central français : contraintes pétrogénétiques et arguments en faveur du métasomatisme mantellique (1982)
- Doctoral advisor: Bor-ming Jahn

Catherine Chauvel (born December 27, 1955) is a geochemist at the Institut de Physique du Globe de Paris known for her research on the impact of volcanic activity on the chemistry of the mantle, continental crust, and island arc geochemistry.

== Education and career ==
Chauvel's research includes mapping of the island of Eiao in the Marquesas archipelago

Chauvel has earned her Ph.D. in geochemistry in 1982 working with Bor-ming Jahn at the University of Rennes. Following her Ph.D., Chauvel was a postdoctoral investigator at the Max Planck Institute in Mainz, Germany from 1982 until 1990. In 1990 she began a French National Centre for Scientific Research (CNRS) position at the University of Rennes where she was promoted to Directeur de Recherche in 1998. From 1999 until 2017, she was at the University Grenoble Alpes in Grenoble, and in 2018 she moved to Institut de Physique du Globe de Paris.

In 2011, Chauvel was elected a fellow of the American Geophysical Union who cited her "for key contributions to understanding mantle evolution by isotope studies of oceanic basalts and linking subducted sediments to arc magmas". From 2015 until 2015, Chauvel was the president of the Volcanology, Geochemistry, and Petrology section of the American Geophysical Union. Starting in 2014, Chauvel has served as one of the editors-in-chief for the journal Chemical Geology.

== Research ==
Chauvel uses geochemistry to examine how terrestrial rocks are formed, and the long-term changes in the mantle and crust. Her Ph.D. research examined neodymium and strontium isotopes and trace elements in the Massif Central, in France. Her subsequent research used neodymium isotopes to date continental crust in Canada and komatiites at Kambalda, Western Australia. In French Polynesia, Chauvel linked multiple components of the mantle to define processes happening beneath the surface. On mid-ocean ridges, Chauvel has examined the movement of lead within the oceanic crust. Chauvel's research using hafnium and neodymium isotopes in oceanic basalt determined the composition of material which is recycled in the subsurface. Following the April 2019 fire at Notre Dame, Chauvel was part of the group that used lead levels in honey to track the fallout from the burned material. The lead concentrations were higher in the down wind areas, and lead isotopes tagged the lead as originating from the fire and not other potential sources of pollutants.

=== Selected publications ===
- Chauvel, Catherine; Hofmann, Albrecht W.; Vidal, Philippe (May 1992). "himu-em: The French Polynesian connection". Earth and Planetary Science Letters. 110 (1–4): 99–119. Bibcode:1992E&PSL.110...99C. doi:10.1016/0012-821X(92)90042-T. ISSN 0012-821X.
- Blichert-Toft, J.; Chauvel, Catherine; Albarède, F. (29 April 1997). "Separation of Hf and Lu for high-precision isotope analysis of rock samples by magnetic sector-multiple collector ICP-MS". Contributions to Mineralogy and Petrology. 127 (3): 248–260. Bibcode:1997CoMP..127..248B. doi:10.1007/s004100050278. S2CID 94792380.
- Chauvel, Catherine; Hémond, Christophe (February 2000). "Melting of a complete section of recycled oceanic crust: Trace element and Pb isotopic evidence from Iceland: RECYCLED OCEANIC CRUST". Geochemistry, Geophysics, Geosystems. 1 (2): n/a. Bibcode:2000GGG.....1.1001C. doi:10.1029/1999GC000002. S2CID 129863055.
- Chauvel, Catherine; Blichert-Toft, Janne (August 2001). "A hafnium isotope and trace element perspective on melting of the depleted mantle". Earth and Planetary Science Letters. 190 (3–4): 137–151. Bibcode:2001E&PSL.190..137C. doi:10.1016/S0012-821X(01)00379-X.
- Chauvel, Catherine; Lewin, Eric; Carpentier, Marion; Arndt, Nicholas T.; Marini, Jean-Christophe (January 2008). "Role of recycled oceanic basalt and sediment in generating the Hf–Nd mantle array". Nature Geoscience. 1 (1): 64–67. Bibcode:2008NatGe...1...64C. doi:10.1038/ngeo.2007.51.

== Awards and honors ==
- Fellow, American Geophysical Union (2011)
- Fellow, European Association of Geochemistry and Geochemical Society (2017)
- Daly lecture, American Geophysical Union (2017)
