= Bor-ming Jahn =

Taiwanese-French geochemist (1940–2016)

- 江博明
- Born: 24 August 1940; Miaoli City, Taiwan
- Died: 1 December 2016 (aged 76); Beitou, Taipei
- Education: National Taiwan University (BS); Brown University (MS); University of Minnesota (PhD)
- Scientific career
- Fields: Geochemistry
- Thesis: Strontium isotope and trace element studies of the lower Precambrian rocks from the Vermilion district, northeastern Minnesota (1972)
- Doctoral students: Catherine Chauvel

Bor-ming Jahn (Chinese: 江博明; pinyin: Jiāng Bómíng; 24 August 1940 – 1 December 2016) was a Taiwanese-French geochemist.

== Life and career ==
Born in Miaoli, Taiwan, on 24 August 1940, Jahn graduated from Hsinchu Senior High School and attended National Taiwan University, where, in 1963, he earned a bachelor's degree in geology. He obtained a master's degree in geochemistry from Brown University in 1967, and completed a Ph.D. at the University of Minnesota in 1972.

After postdoctoral work and further research at NASA and the Lunar Science Institute, Jahn moved to France and joined the University of Rennes I faculty in 1976. Jahn acquired French nationality in May 1980. In 2003, he returned to Taiwan, serving as distinguished research fellow affiliated with the Institute of Earth Sciences, Academia Sinica from August 2004 to 2010. He left Academia Sinica to take an appointment at NTU, as distinguished chair professor of the department of geosciences. Between 2006 and 2016, Jahn was chief editor of the Journal of Asian Earth Sciences.

Over the course of his career, Jahn was granted fellowship by the Mineralogical Society of America and Geological Society of America in 2004, followed by the Geochemical Society and European Association of Geochemistry in 2006. In 2012, Jahn was elected a member of Academia Sinica. The next year, the French government named Jahn a chevalier of the ordre des Palmes Académiques. In 2016, the Geological Society of America awarded Jahn honorary fellow status. He died on 1 December 2016, at the Taipei Veterans General Hospital.
