= List of fires at places of worship =

This is a list of notable ecclesiastical buildings that have suffered significant fires. Some medieval-era places of worship have been subject to repeated fires, causing significant destruction and requiring varying levels of reconstruction. While most of the primary structural elements of these buildings are fire-resistant stone, the roof structures are usually of wood construction, at least as originally built. This list compiles significant fires at prominent religious sites.

== Australia ==
- St Patrick's Cathedral, Parramatta – The 1854 cathedral was rebuilt following a 1996 fire.

== Austria ==
- St. Stephen's Cathedral, Vienna – The cathedral's roof was destroyed by fire on 12 April 1945.

== Belgium ==
- Cathedral of Our Lady (Antwerp) – A fire on 5–6 October 1533 damaged the church.
- Saint Lambert's Cathedral, Liège – was destroyed by fire on 28/29 April 1185. It was rebuilt and again destroyed by revolutionaries beginning in 1795
- St. Salvator's Cathedral, Bruges – The church's predecessor was destroyed by fire in 1116. A fire destroyed the roof of the present building in 1839.

== Canada ==
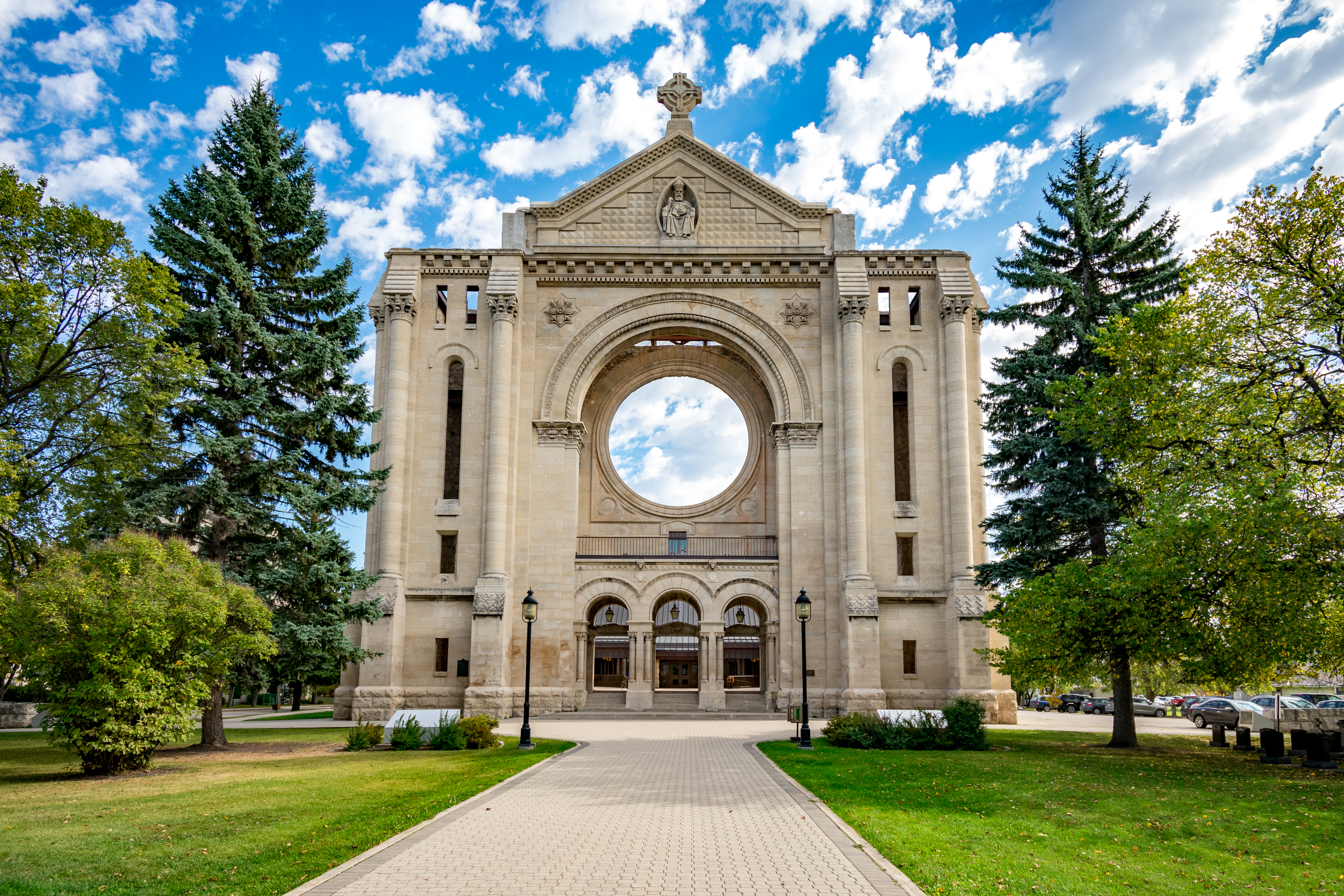
Facade of St. Boniface Cathedral, Winnipeg, which burned down in 1968

- Saint-Jacques Cathedral, Montreal – burned down in 1852, 1858, and 1933. Finally demolished, with the spire and south transept wall (which had survived the 1933 fire) being incorporated into the Pavillon Judith-Jasmin of the Université du Québec à Montréal. The seat of the diocese was moved to Mary, Queen of the World Cathedral in 1894.
- Saint Boniface Cathedral, Winnipeg – Burned down in 1860, and more famously in 1968; the facade still stands, with a modern cathedral building behind it.
- St. Anne's Anglican Church, Toronto – Gutted by fire in 2024, destroying murals by the Group of Seven.
- Mcdougall United Church, Morely, Alberta – Destroyed by fire in 2017, deemed to be arson.

== Chile ==
- Church of the Company Fire – 8 December 1863, with between 2,000 and 3,000 deaths, believed to be the most to perish in a single building fire.

== China ==
- Yongning Pagoda – The pagoda, built in 516, was struck by lightning in 534 and destroyed.

== Czech Republic ==
- Olomouc Synagogue – The synagogue in Olomouc (then Czechoslovakia was burned at Nazi instigation on the night of 15–16 March 1939.
- Opava Synagogue – The synagogue in Opava was burned in 1938 by Sudeten Germans.

== Denmark ==
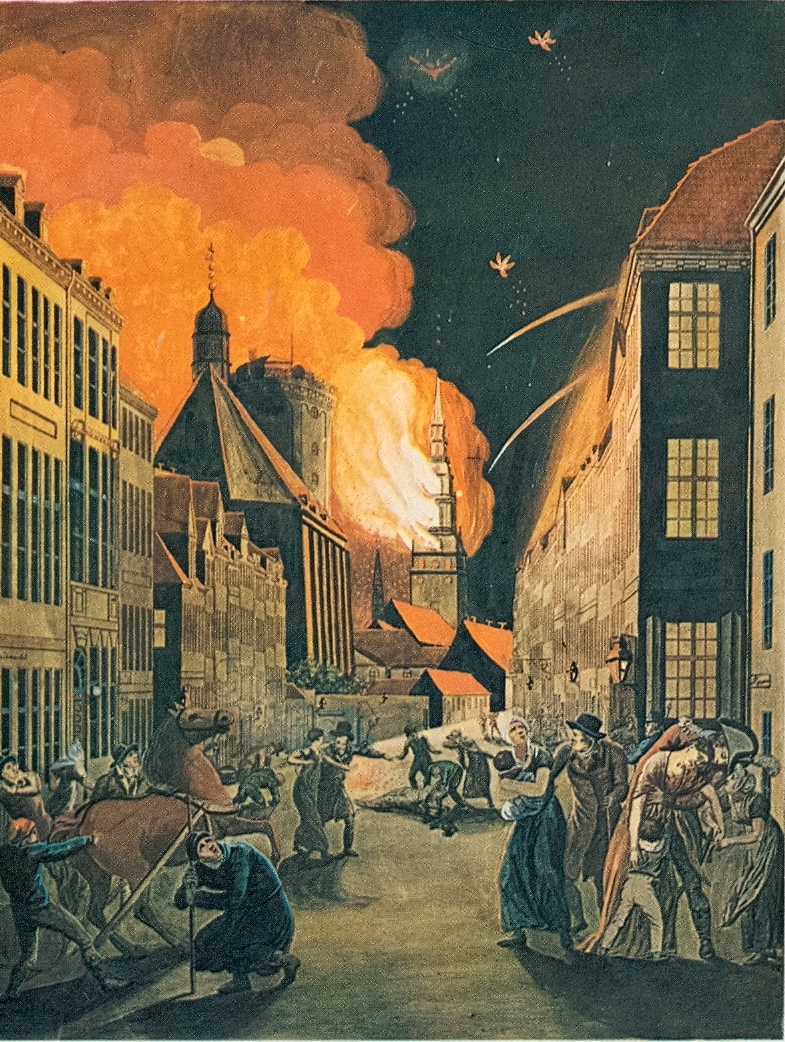
The Church of Our Lady during the Bombardment of Copenhagen in 1807

- Aarhus Cathedral – The previous cathedral was destroyed by fire, along with the rest of the town, in 1330. In 1642 a fire caused by lightning destroyed the tower and some of the bells.
- Church of Our Lady, Copenhagen – Earlier churches on the site burned in 1314 and 1728. The predecessor to the present building was destroyed during the bombardment of Copenhagen in September 1807.
- Roskilde Cathedral – On 14 May 1443, the town suffered a fire which damaged the cathedral.

== Fiji ==
- Kendrit Shiri Sanatan Dharam Shiv Temple – Burned by Christian extremists in a chain of arson attacks on temples in 2008.

== Finland ==
- Oulu Cathedral – The original wooden structure was destroyed by fire in 1822.
- Porvoo Cathedral – Burned in 1508, 1571, 1590 and 1708, and again in an arson attack in 2006.
- Turku Cathedral – The cathedral was badly damaged in the 1827 Great Fire of Turku.

== France ==
- Amiens Cathedral – A 1258 fire damaged the cathedral while it was under construction. The previous Romanesque cathedral burned in 1218.
- Angers Cathedral – The predecessor to the current church burned in 1032, immediately after it was completed.
- Angoulême Cathedral – Previous cathedrals on the site were burned in the 6th and 8th centuries.
- Auxerre Cathedral – The predecessor to the present cathedral was destroyed by fire in 1023.
- Bayeux Cathedral – After fires in 1077 and 1105, the 11th century Bayeux Cathedral was rebuilt into the present church, starting in the early 12th century. An 1160 fire caused extensive damage.
- Bayonne Cathedral – An earlier cathedral on the site was destroyed by fires in 1258 and 1310.
- Beauvais Cathedral – Three fires led to the start of a replacement for the former basilica at the site. The Basse Oeuvre is the remnant of the original church, having survived fires in the 11th and 12th centuries. The ambitious project suffered from structural instability, leading to repeated collapses, in 1284 and 1573.
- Belfort Cathedral – A timber church on the site was destroyed by fire in 1212.

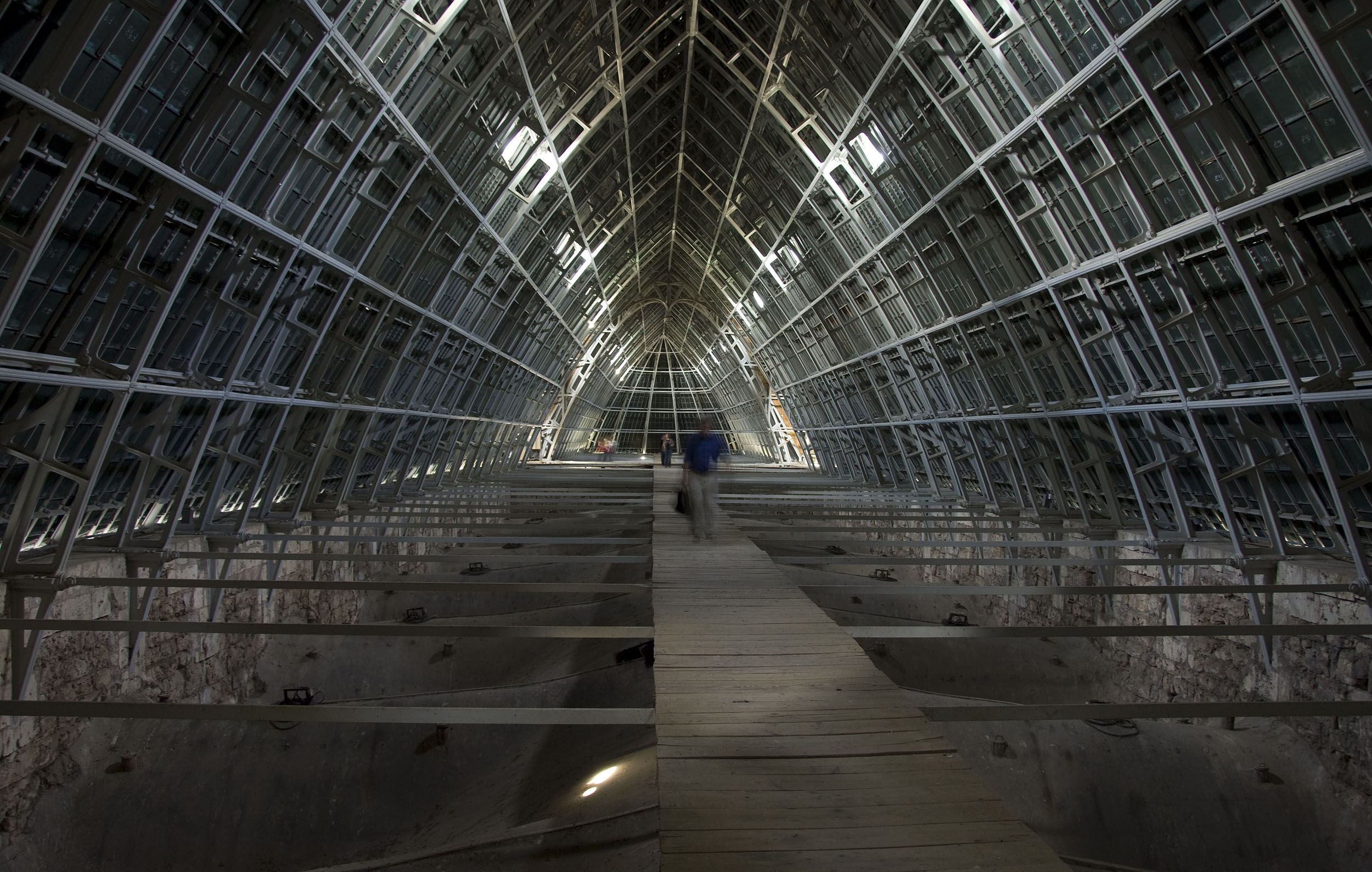
The rebuilt attic space at Chartres, with the tops of the vaults visible under the walkway

- Chartres Cathedral – The present building is the latest of at least five structures destroyed by fire and war, with documented events in 858, 962 and 1020. After the 1020 fire the basis of the present cathedral was begun. In 1134 the town suffered a fire, which may have damaged the cathedral. A fire destroyed the east tower in 1194, leading to the reconstruction of the nave and choir. A lightning strike in 1506 destroyed the northeast tower, leading to its replacement in flamboyant Gothic style. A further fire in 1836 destroyed the lead-covered roof. Its replacement was undertaken in iron.
- Cambrai Cathedral – The cathedral was damaged in a fire in 1859 and restored by Viollet-le-Duc.
- Coutances Cathedral – The cathedral's predecessor was damaged by fire before the 13th century.
- Dijon Cathedral – was damaged by a fire in 1137 that destroyed much of Dijon.
- Evreux Cathedral – An early church was destroyed by fire in war in 1119. A replacement burned in 1198 in continuing hostilities between France and England.
- Langres Cathedral – The roof of the nave was destroyed by fire in 1314. A lightning-caused fire caused damage in 1562.
- Le Mans Cathedral – A church dating to 1160 on the site burned, together with much of Le Mans, on 3 September 1134, with a second fire in 1137. The chevet survived, and a new nave was constructed. The chevet was eventually rebuilt between 1217 and 1254.
- Metz Cathedral – A 1468 fire damaged the roof. Fireworks caused a fire in 1877.
- Nantes Cathedral – A fire on 28 January 1972 extensively damaged the roof, requiring a full restoration of the cathedral's interior. Another fire occurred on 18 July 2020. This fire centred around the organ level right behind the main circular window.
- Nantes Basilica of St. Donatian and St. Rogatian – Roofers working on refurbishment accidentally started a fire on 15 June 2015, which severely damaged the back and roof.
- Noyon Cathedral was built following a fire in 1131.

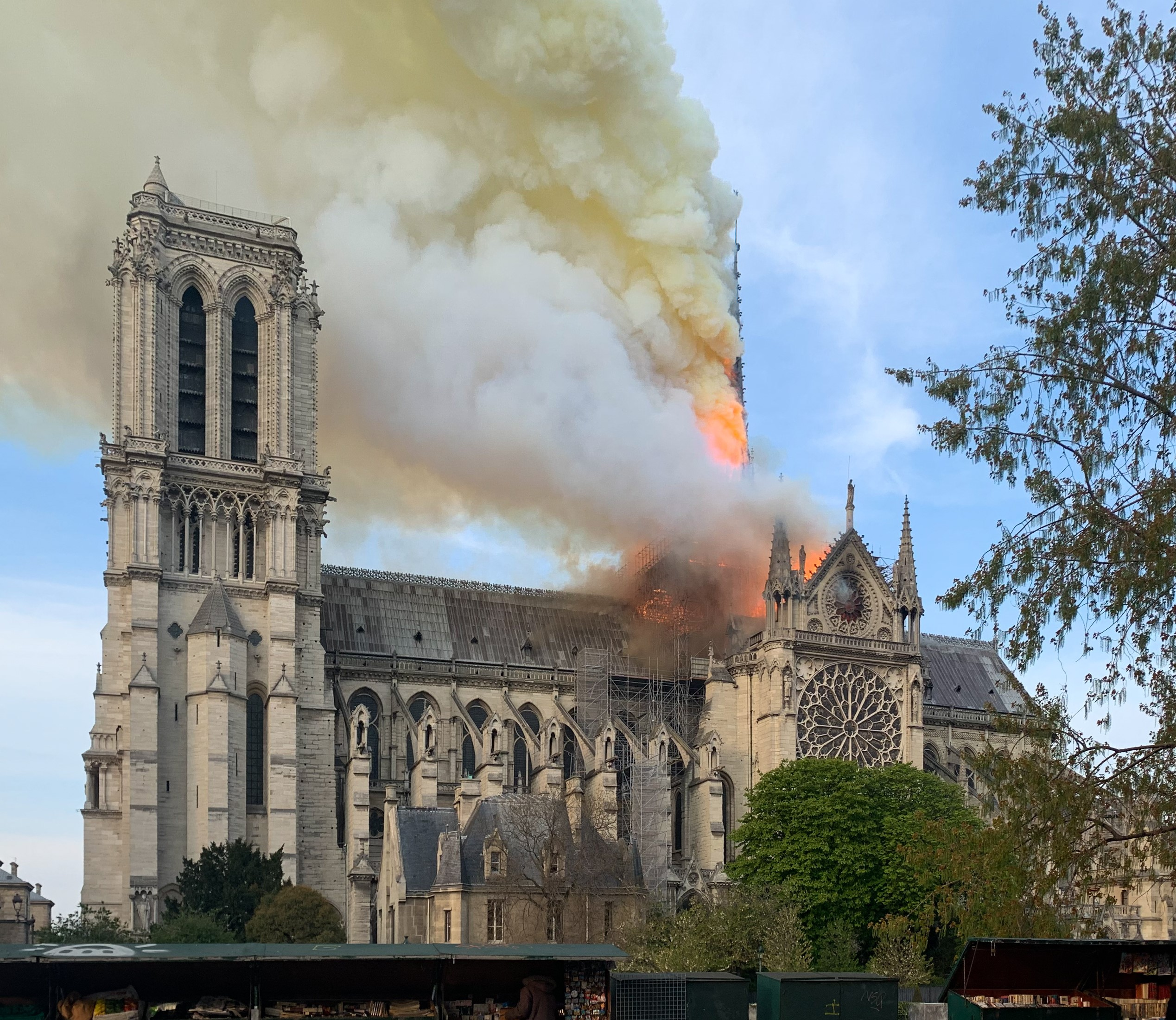
Early stage of the Notre Dame de Paris fire

- Notre-Dame Cathedral, Paris – On 15 April 2019 the cathedral's roof caught fire, leading to the destruction of the 12th-century roof structure and the 19th-century spire.
- Poitiers Cathedral – The organ was destroyed in a fire on 25 December 1681.
- Quimper Cathedral – One tower burned in 1620.
- Reims Cathedral – An earlier Our Lady of Reims was destroyed by fire on 6 May 1210. Work on the present building began a year later. A fire in 1481 destroyed the attic framing, central tower and aisle gallery roofs. During World War I, German shelling set fire to scaffolding at the north tower, destroying the roof and the bishop's palace. In both cases, the lead roofing material melted. After the war, the cathedral roof was reconstructed using concrete framing.
- Rouen Cathedral – Its immediate predecessor was struck by lightning in 1110. An early version of the present church burned on Easter in 1200. It was struck by lightning in 1284. The main spire blew down in 1353. More lightning strikes took place in 1625 and 1642. A fire in 1727 damaged the choir roof. A replacement spire was destroyed by lightning in 1822, and was replaced with a neo-Gothic spire. Two aerial bombings in 1944 damaged the church, the second destroyed the roof, the north tower and much of Rouen by fire.
- Rouen Synagogue – In 2024 an arsonist caused "significant damage" before being shot and killed by police.
- Senlis Cathedral – In 1504 a fire caused by lightning destroyed the roof and vaulting.
- Strasbourg Cathedral – A Carolingian basilica at the site caught fire in 873, 1002 and 1007. Its replacement burned in 1015.
- Synagogue du Quai Kléber – The main synagogue of Strasbourg was deliberately burned by Hitler Youth on the night of 30 September-1 October 1940, following a previous attempt on 12 September.

== Germany ==
- Berlin Cathedral – An incendiary bomb set fire to the dome on 24 May 1944.
- Capernaum Church, Berlin – The church was bombed and burned out in May 1944, and the tower burned in February 1945.
- Cologne Cathedral – The second cathedral was destroyed by fire in 1248 as it was being demolished to make way for a new cathedral. The cathedral was damaged by 14 bomb strikes during World War II.
- Dresden Frauenkirche – The Frauenkirche was destroyed in the bombing of Dresden, catching fire on 13 February 1945 and collapsing on 15 February.
- Hildesheim Cathedral – In 1046, the cathedral caught fire and the nave of the building was destroyed. On 22 March 1945, a bombing raid during World War II set fire to the building and destroyed the cathedral.
- Lübeck Cathedral – On the night of Palm Sunday (28–29 March) 1942 a Royal Air Force bombing raid destroyed the eastern vaults. A fire started in the adjoining museum and spread to the attic, and on Palm Sunday the towers collapsed. An Arp Schnitger organ was lost in the flames
- Magdeburg Cathedral – The cathedral burned in 1207. On 16 January 1945, during World War II, a bombing raid set fire to the church. It was successfully contained, but caused significant damage.
- Mainz Cathedral – On 29 August 1009, on the Day of the consecration of the cathedral, a fire burned out the building.
- New Synagogue (Berlin) – An attempt was made on Kristallnacht to burn it down. It was finally destroyed during aerial bombing in late 1944 into early 1945. At least 267 synagogues of varying sizes were burned or destroyed during Kristallnacht.

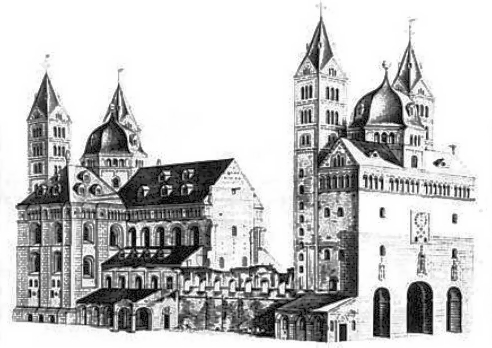
Speyer Cathedral showing the fire damage to the nave

- Speyer Cathedral – On 31 May 1689 a fire started during the Nine Years' War destroyed the western part of the nave.

== Hungary ==
- Gothic Protestant Church of Avas – Burned down in 1544, during the Ottoman occupation of Hungary. Rebuilt during the 16th century.
- Wooden Church – Set on fire on 4 December 1997, rebuilt in 1999.

== Ireland ==
- St Mel's cathedral, Longford – The cathedral was heavily damaged on Christmas Day in 2009 by a fire that originated in a chimney flue.

== Israel/Palestine ==
- Al-Aqsa Mosque – The Minbar of the al-Aqsa Mosque was burned in an arson attack in 1969.
- Church of the Holy Sepulchre – 1808

== Italy ==
- Basilica of Saint Paul Outside the Walls – During the 5th century the roof was destroyed by fire. On 15 July 1823 repairs to the lead roof started a fire that destroyed nearly all of the basilica.

== Japan ==
- Kinkaku-ji – Built beginning in 1397, burned in 1565 and again burned by arson in 1950.
- Yanaka – The five-story pagoda in Yanaka Cemetery, Taitō, Tokyo was burned in a murder-suicide in 1957. It had previously burned in the Great Fire of Meguro in 1772.

== Kosovo ==
- Cathedral of Saint George – Burned during the 2004 unrest in Kosovo in Prizren.
- Our Lady of Ljeviš – Burned during the 2004 unrest in Kosovo in Prizren.

== Latvia ==
- The synagogues of Riga were burned in a pogrom by German forces in July 1941, some with refugees inside. The Great Choral Synagogue was burned on 4 July and the fire was filmed for propaganda purposes. Only the Peitav Synagogue was spared.

== Libya ==
- Slat Abn Shaif Synagogue – The synagogue was destroyed by fire in 1868 but rebuilt in 1870 by the Pasha of Tripoli. It was destroyed by fire again in 1912, and then rebuilt. It was razed in the 1980s by order of Muammar Gaddafi.

== Macau ==
- Ruins of Saint Paul's in Macao – The church was damaged by fire during a typhoon in January 1835.

== Netherlands ==
- St. Martin's Cathedral, Utrecht – The site saw several buildings that were destroyed by fire or military attack from the 9th century onwards. A 1023 structure, known as Adalbod's Dom, was partly destroyed in a city-wide fire in 1253. The current church was started in 1254. The unfinished nave collapsed in 1674 when it was struck by a tornado, and was never rebuilt. However, a 2004 replica, built in scaffolding, was destroyed that year in a storm.
- A fire broke out at the Sint-Brigidakerk in Noorbeek on 3 February 2021.
- A fire destroyed the Vondelkerk in Amsterdam during new year's celebration on 1 January 2026.

== Norway ==
- Fantoft Stave Church – Built around 1150, burned by arson in 1992.
- Grue Church fire – 1822
- Old Åsane Church – Built in 1795, burned by arson in 1992.

== Poland ==
- The New Synagogue of Tarnów was set on fire by Nazis in November 1939.

== Romania ==
- Costești wooden church, Argeș County (18 April 1930) - A fire broke out during a Good Friday service in a small wooden church, killing 116 people (mostly children) and destroying the building.
- Bistrița Evangelical Church, Bistrița-Năsăud County (11 June 2008) - A fire during renovation works engulfed the historic Evangelical (Lutheran) church’s tower and parts of the roof.
- Râmeț Monastery, Râmeț, Alba County (5 July 2019) - A large fire affected the monastery complex’s roof and buildings; firefighters worked for many hours to extinguish the blaze.
- Wooden church, Borșa, Maramureș County (9 April 2023) - A wooden church was destroyed by fire on Palm Sunday; firefighters intervened but could not save the building.
- Topla wooden church, Banat Village Museum, Timișoara, Timiș County (25–26 March 2025) - A wooden church, nearly 300 years old, burned almost completely during restoration work.

== Russia ==
- Trinity Cathedral, Saint Petersburg – A fire on 24 August 2006 destroyed the main dome and a cupola.

== Slovakia ==
- St Catherine's Church, Dolný Kubín – A fire in 1895 almost destroyed the church but was quickly repaired with the help of a generous churchgoers and the dean.

== Slovenia ==
- Ljubljana Cathedral – Burned in 1361 and 1469.

== Spain ==
- El Escorial – 1671
- Santa Maria del Mar, Barcelona – The Catalan Gothic church was damaged in the 1428 Catalonia earthquake. In 1936, during the Spanish Civil War, it burned for 11 days.

== Sweden ==
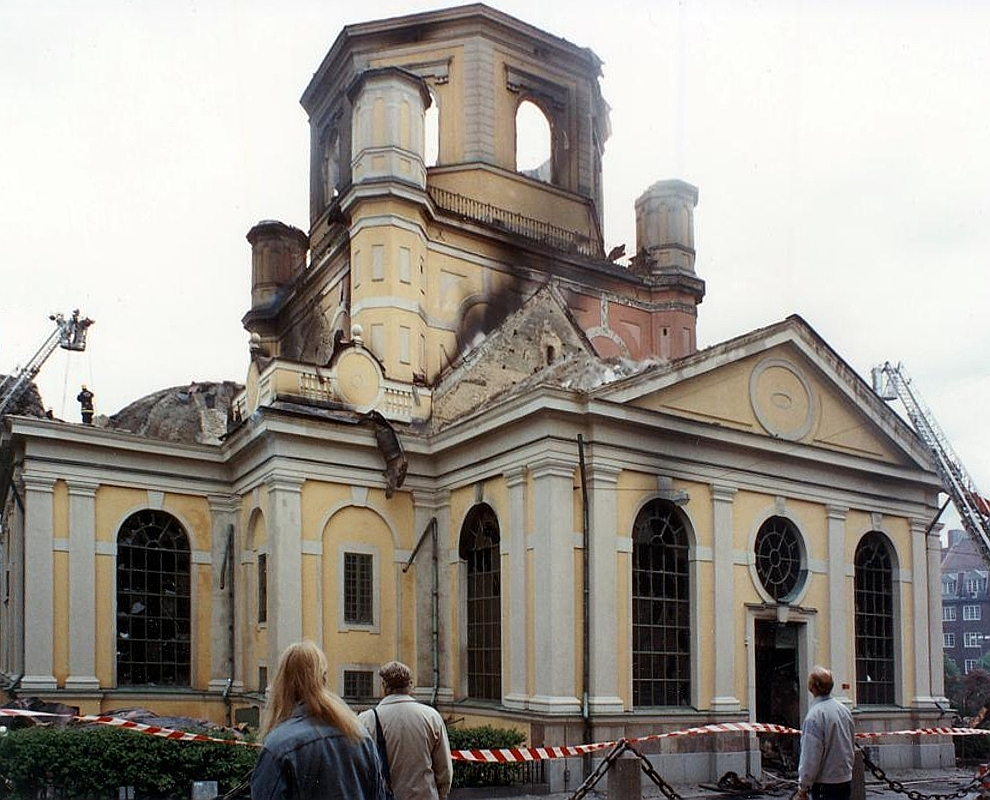
Katarina Church showing damage due to fire in 1990

- Gothenburg Cathedral – The predecessor to the present cathedral was destroyed by fire on 15 April 1721.
- Lund Cathedral – Badly damaged in a fire in 1234.
- Katarina Church, Stockholm – The church was destroyed by fire on the night of 1 May 1723, when a fire began in a mill in the Maria Church parish and spread eastward, resulting in the collapse of the Catherine Church's dome and tower. Another fire on 17 May 1990 also damaged the church, leaving only the walls intact.
- Uppsala Cathedral – A fire in 1702 damaged the town, including the cathedral.

== Syria ==
- Umayyad Mosque – On 17 March 1400, Timur burned Damascus, and with it, the Umayyad Mosque. The mosque was extensively damaged again by fire in 1893.

== Turkey ==
- Hagia Sophia – Two predecessor churches at the site burned in 404 and 532.
- Süleymaniye Mosque – The mosque was damaged in the Great Fire of 1660. An earthquake caused a partial dome collapse in 1766, and a second fire during World War I while it was being used for ammunition storage.

== Ukraine ==
- Gwoździec Synagogue was damaged during World War I, rebuilt, and entirely destroyed in 1941. At the time of its construction it was within the Polish–Lithuanian Commonwealth.
- Pohrebyshche Synagogue – The wooden synagogue burned several times before the 1690 restoration was destroyed in World War II.

== United Kingdom ==
- St Simon's Roman Catholic Church - The church was set on fire and destroyed with only the stone walls left standing by Ryan Haggerty on 28 July 2021.
- St Mary's Church, Barnes – The church was badly damaged by fire in June 1978.
- Canterbury Cathedral – The cathedral was destroyed by fire in 1067. Another fire in 1174 damaged the choir, leading to the rebuilding of the east end of the cathedral. An earthquake damaged the cathedral in 1382. An 1872 fire destroyed the roof of the Trinity Chapel. Fires sustained during World War II bombings were quickly extinguished.
- Chichester Cathedral – An 1187 fire destroyed the cathedral and town.
- Coventry Cathedral – The Gothic St Michael's Church was destroyed in the Coventry Blitz on 14 November 1940. A new church was built next to the ruins, which have been stabilized and preserved.

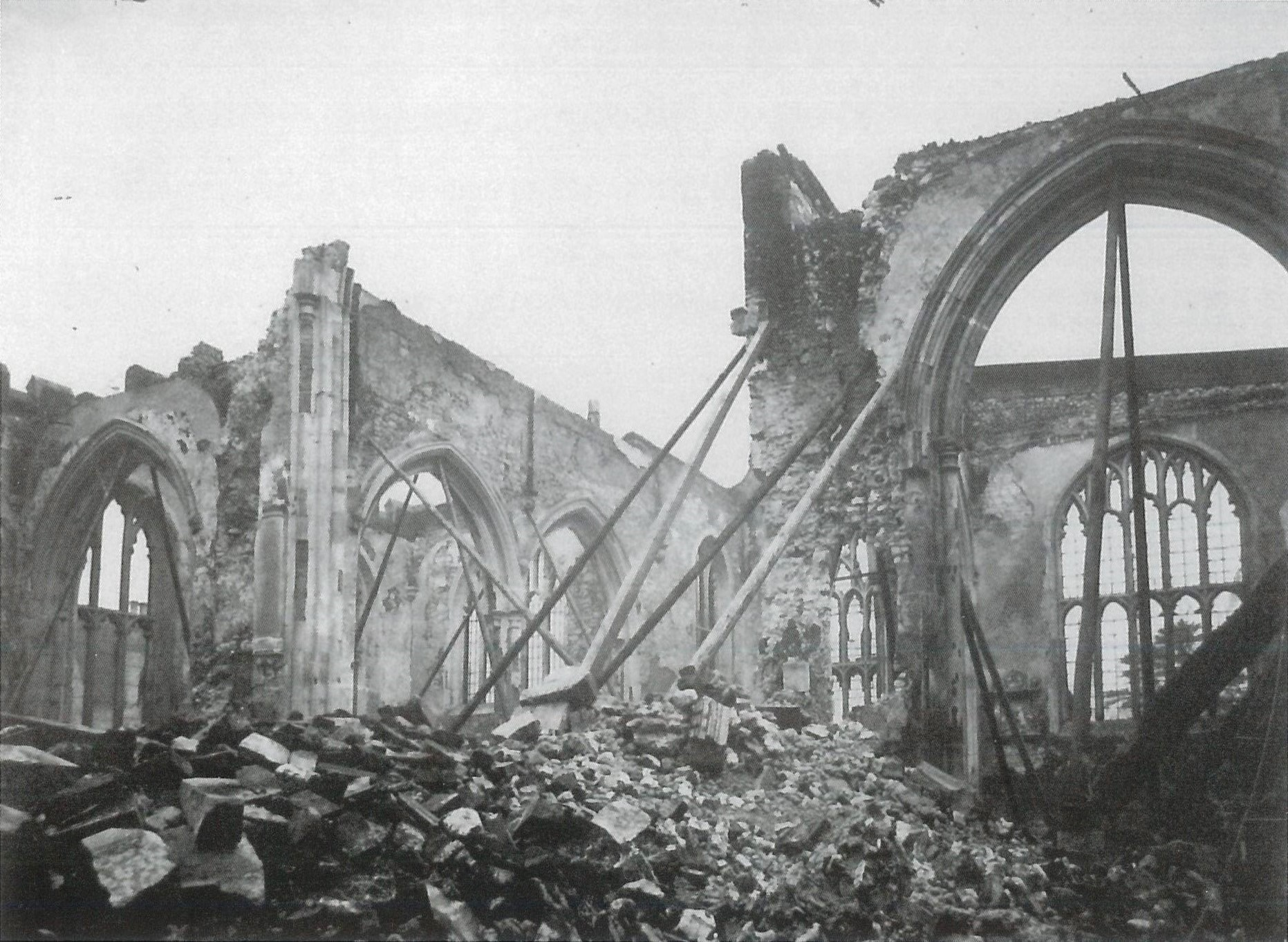
The fire-damaged ruins of Croydon parish church in 1867

- St John the Baptist's Church, Croydon – The medieval predecessor of the present church building was destroyed by fire during the night of 5 January 1867.
- St Mary's Church, Ewell – The entire north aisle of the church, except for a print by William Holman Hunt, was destroyed in a fire in 1973.
- Hereford Cathedral – Welsh forces burned the predecessor of the present cathedral in 1056.

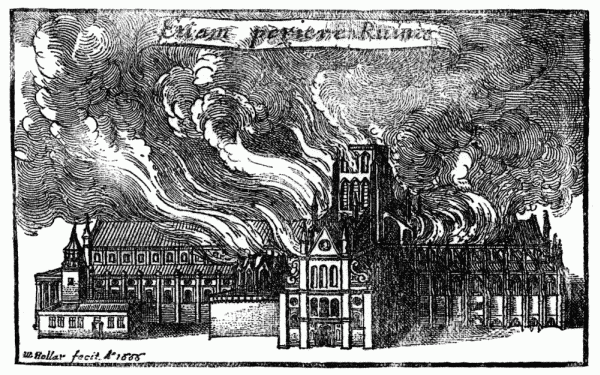
St Paul's during the Great Fire of London

- St Paul's Cathedral, London – The predecessor to the present St Paul's Cathedral was destroyed in the 1666 Great Fire of London. Built starting in 1087 after a city fire the same year, it was damaged while under construction by another London fire in 1135. A 1561 fire in the church's 460-foot (140 m) spire was ignited by a lightning strike, destroying the spire and much of the roof, melting the lead The final 1666 fire was abetted by scaffolding around the building, whose heat calcined the stone. Demolition of the ruins was complicated by solidified lead that bound the ruins together.
- List of churches destroyed in the Great Fire of London and not rebuilt – Many London churches were destroyed in the Great Fire of 1666.
- St Botolph's Aldgate, London – Damaged by fire in 1965.
- St Clement Danes, London – On 10 May 1941, during the London Blitz, a bombing raid set fire to the church.
- St Mary-at-Hill, London – The predecessor was rebuilt after the Great Fire of 1666. On 10 May 1987, a fire destroyed much of the church's interior, including its box pews.
- St Peter's Church, Eaton Square, London – The original church was destroyed by fire in 1837, only a decade after its completion. Its successor was very badly damaged by arson in October 1987.
- Newcastle Cathedral – A Norman predecessor burned in 1216.
- Norwich Cathedral – In 1171 a fire damaged the nave. A lightning strike in 1463 ignited the spire and destroyed the nave roof. The heat of the fire changed the limestone of the nave from cream colored to pink in places. In 1509 the transept roofs burned.
- Peterborough Cathedral – A 22 November 2001, arson caused substantial damage to the cathedral where the wooden ceiling came within moments of catching fire. Fortunately the fire was spotted by one of the vergers allowing a swift response by emergency services. The timing was particularly unfortunate, for a complete restoration of the painted wooden ceiling was nearing completion.
- St Mary's Church, Putney – The church was badly damaged by fire as the result of an arson attack in 1973. The interior was completely rebuilt and the church re-consecrated in 1982.
- Sheffield Cathedral – The parish church predecessor was burned in 1266. The present cathedral has suffered from fires in the 20th and 21st centuries.
- Southwark Cathedral – The cathedral's predecessor was destroyed in 1212 by the Great Fire of Southwark.
- Southwell Cathedral – Lightning striking the southwest tower burned the tower roof, nave and crossing on 5 November 1711.
- St Leonard's Church, Streatham – The church, rebuilt in 1830, was badly damaged by fire in May 1975.

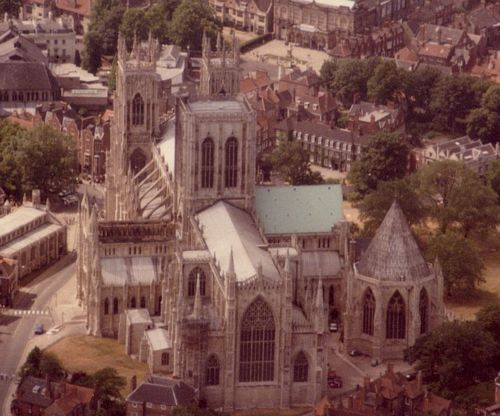
York Minster showing the fire damage to the roof of the south transept

- York Minster – An earlier church was destroyed by fire in 741. Its successor was damaged in 1069 during the harrying of the North, and finally destroyed by the Danes in 1070. A new Norman style structure was built from 1080 and was damaged by fire in 1137. It was replaced in stages by the present structure. An 1840 fire destroyed the roof over the nave, southwest tower and south aisle. On 9 July 1984 a major fire destroyed the roof and vaulted ceiling of the 13th-century south transept.

== United States ==
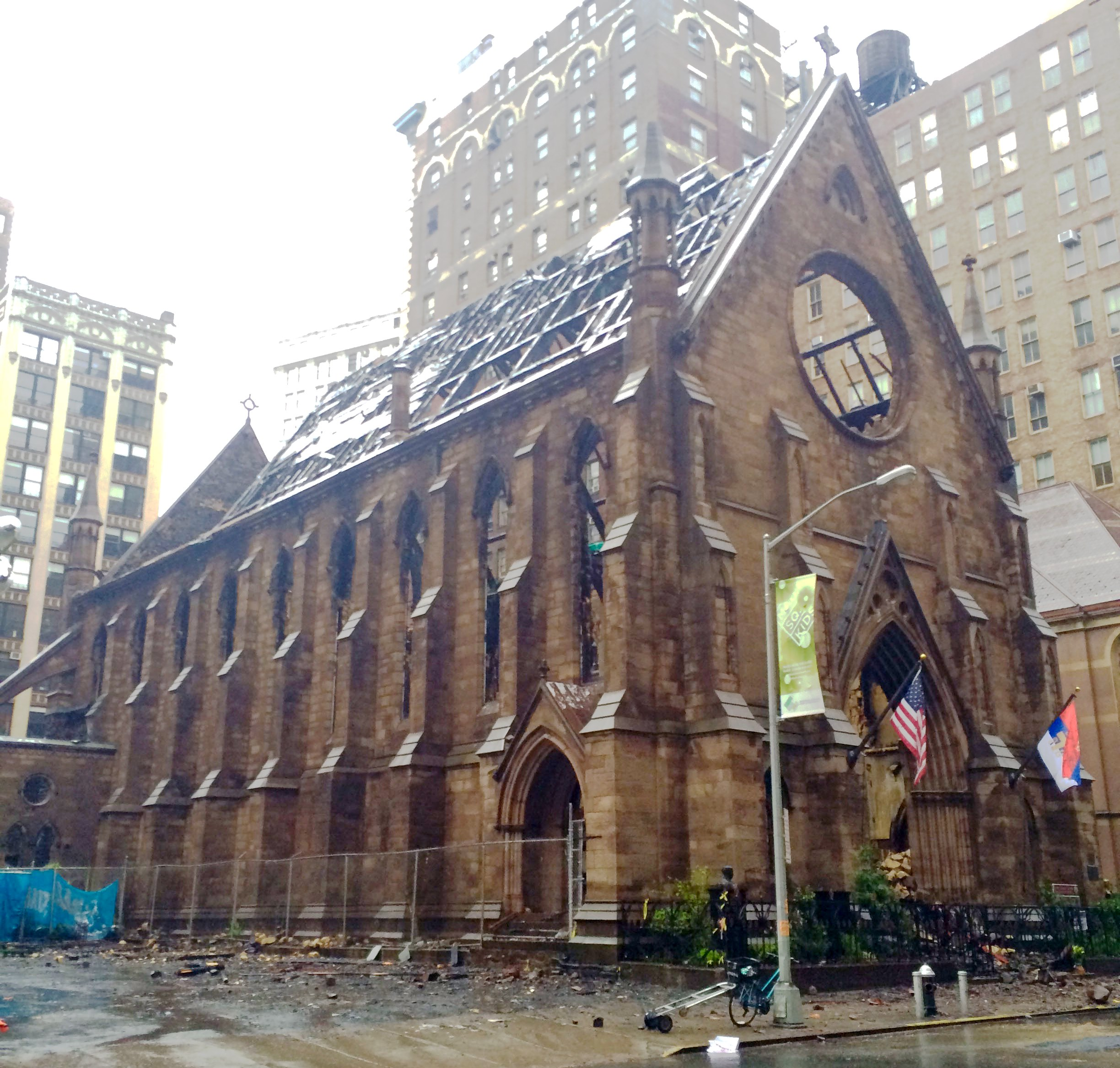
The fire-damaged St Sava's Cathedral, New York City, on 3 May 2016.

- Adas Israel Congregation – The synagogue in Duluth, Minnesota was destroyed by arson in 2019.
- Cathedral of St. John the Divine, New York City – On 18 December 2001, the unfinished north transept of the cathedral was badly damaged by fire.
- Cathedral of Saint Mary of the Assumption (San Francisco, California) – Destroyed by arson on 7 December 1962.
- Church of the Epiphany (Roman Catholic, Manhattan) – The predecessor to the present building was destroyed on 20 December 1963 by a lit cigarette.
- Church of the Incarnation, Episcopal (Manhattan) – The predecessor to the present building was destroyed by fire on 24 March 1882.
- Mission San Gabriel Arcángel, San Gabriel, California – On 11 July 2020, the mission was damaged by arson, with the sanctuary roof completely destroyed.
- Precious Blood Church fire – Destroyed 27 May 1875 when a breeze from an open window blew lacing draped over a statue of the Blessed Virgin Mary into a lit candle.
- St. Agnes Church (New York City) – Damaged by fire on 24 December 1898. A second fire on 10 December 1992 left only the walls and towers standing.
- St. Peter's Church (Washington, D.C.) – Destroyed 17 March 1940, when a blowtorch being used to remove paint from the windows of the clerestory set off a spark.
- Notre Dame de Lourdes, Fall River, Massachusetts – Destroyed on 11 May 1982 due to a renovation accident, also burning down much of the neighboring block due to high winds.
- Trinity Chapel Complex (also known as the Serbian Orthodox Cathedral of St. Sava), Manhattan, New York City – Badly damaged in a major fire on 1 May 2016.

== See also ==
- Construction and renovation fires are a common fire type at places of worship
