= Shirt of Saint Louis =

Catholic relic preserved in the Notre-Dame de Paris cathedral

The shirt of Saint Louis, also known as the tunic of Saint Louis, is a relic venerated by some Catholics.

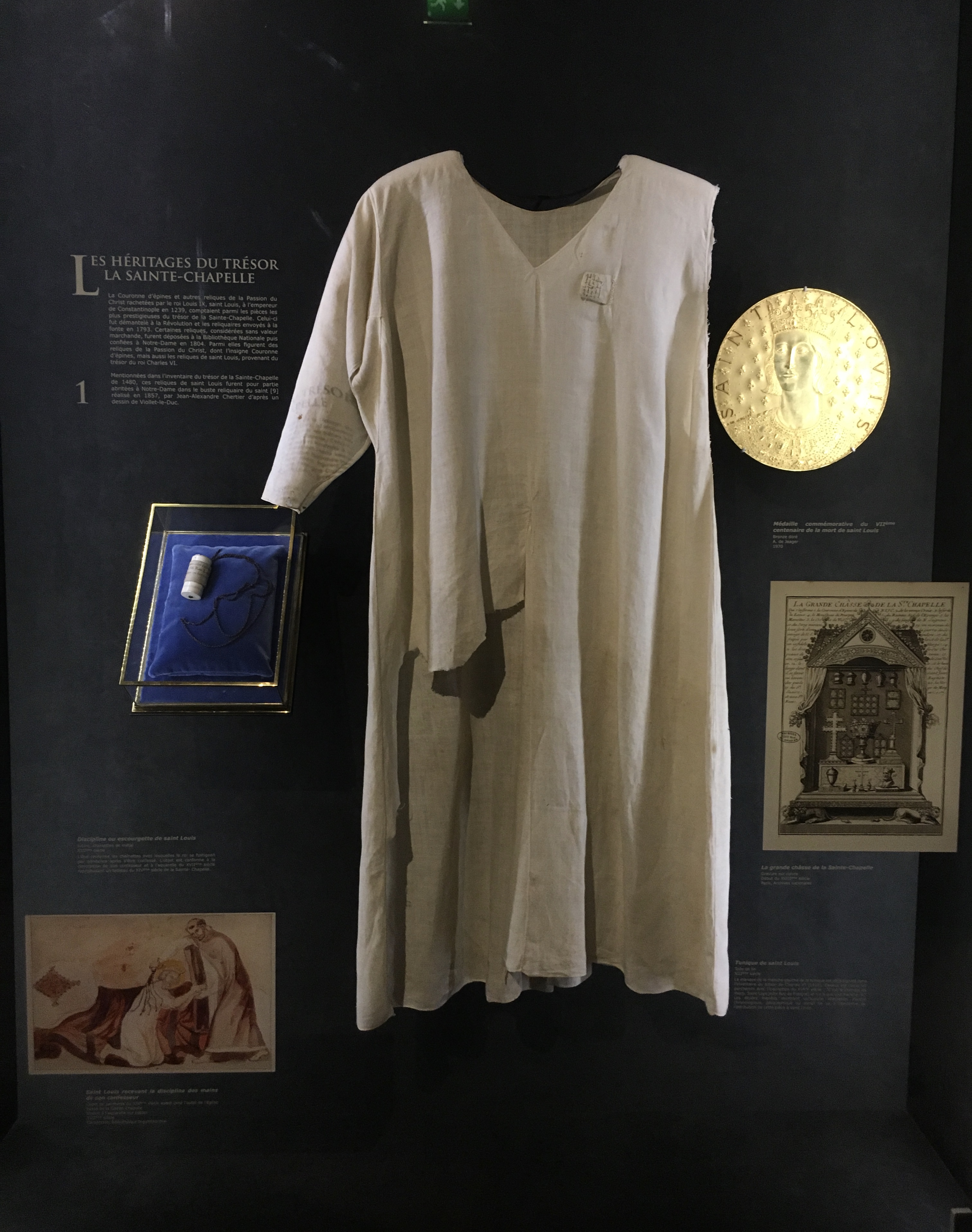
The shirt and other treasures of Saint Louis, Notre-Dame de Paris.

== Description ==
It is a shirt that belonged to the King of France and Catholic Saint Louis IX and a sign of his piety.

Made of a white linen fabric with 31 warp threads per cm² for 27 weft threads, it is 43 cm wide and 111.4 cm high. One sleeve is missing, and it shows traces of blood. The seams are narrow, and it was cut from narrow-woven cloth. The pattern is simple and often used to make reconstructions.

A parchment from the 15th century sewn to the shirt indicates “C'est la chemise de mons. saint Louis jadis Roy de fran et nya que une manche” (in old French: "It is the shirt of lord Saint Louis once king of France and there is only one sleeve”).

== History ==
The exact age of the garment is uncertain. It is said to date to the 13th century, and expert analysis has not discovered any reason to doubt this.

The shirt appears in the inventory of the Sainte-Chapelle from 1480 onwards; prior to that it had been listed among the contents of the French king's treasury. It was already damaged at this time. It was then transferred to the Basilica of Saint-Denis on 12 March 1791, then to the Bibliothèque nationale de France on 18 November 1793.

Preserved since 1804 at Notre-Dame de Paris, the shirt has been classified as an historic monument since 11 September 1974. It was restored in 2014 by Chevalier-conservation.

It was saved from the fire of 15 April 2019, at the same time as the Holy Crown, thanks in particular to the priest Jean-Marc Fournier, chaplain of the Paris fire brigade.
