= Mei-Fu Zhou =

Mei-Fu Zhou (Chinese: 周美夫) is a Chinese geologist.

He graduated from Nanjing University in 1983, and pursued graduate study in Canada, where he earned a master's degree from the University of Saskatchewan in 1992, followed by a doctorate from Dalhousie University in 1995. Zhou began teaching at the University of Hong Kong in 1996. Zhou is a fellow of the Geological Society of America and the chief editor of the Journal of Asian Earth Sciences.
