= Notre-Dame fire =

2019 church fire in Paris, France

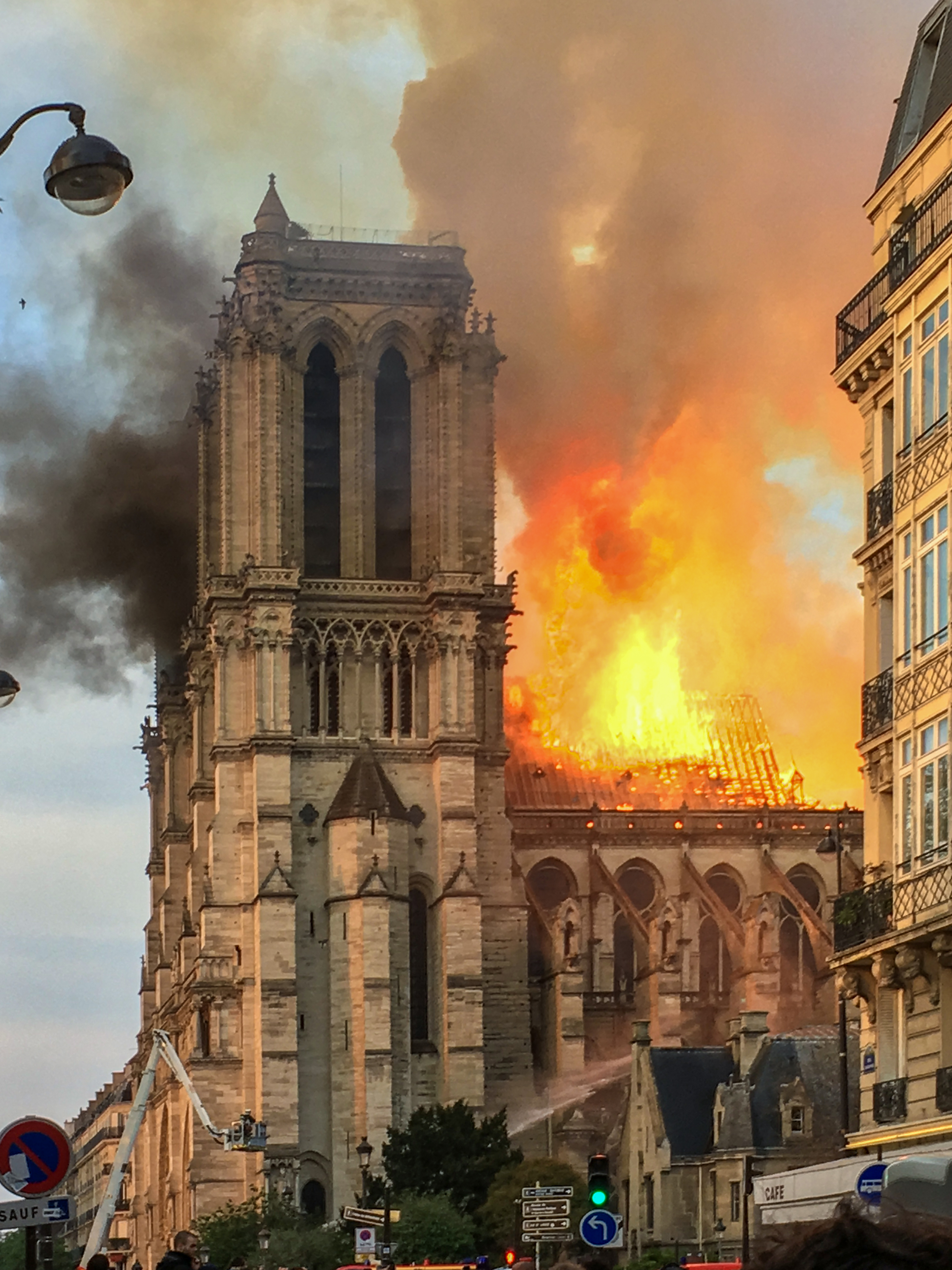
- Notre-Dame de Paris aflame, as seen from the Square René Viviani

- Notre-Dame Cathedral (Paris) Notre-Dame Cathedral (France)
- Date: 15 April 2019; 7 years ago
- Time: 18:18 CEST (16:18 UTC)
- Duration: 15 hours
- Venue: Notre-Dame de Paris
- Location: Paris, France; 48.8530°N 2.3500°E
- Cause: Accidental
- Deaths: None
- Injuries: 3
- Property damage: Roof and spire destroyed; windows and vaulted ceilings damaged

On 15 April 2019, at 18:18 CEST, a structural fire broke out in the roof space of Notre-Dame de Paris, a medieval Catholic cathedral in Paris, France, part of the "Paris, Banks of the Seine" UNESCO World Heritage Site.

The fire, which investigators believe was started by a cigarette or an electrical short circuit, destroyed the cathedral's wooden spire (flèche) and most of the wooden roof and severely damaged the cathedral's upper walls. The vaulted stone ceiling largely contained the burning roof as it collapsed, preventing extensive damage to the interior. Many works of art and religious relics were moved to safety, but others suffered smoke damage, and some of the exterior art was damaged or destroyed. The cathedral's altar, two pipe organs, and three 13th-century rose windows suffered little or no damage. Three emergency workers were injured. The fire contaminated the site and nearby areas of Paris with toxic dust and lead.

The cathedral was then closed immediately. Two days after the blaze, President of France Emmanuel Macron set a five-year deadline to restore it. Notre-Dame did not hold a Christmas Mass in 2019 for the first time since 1803. By September 2021, donors had contributed over €840 million to the rebuilding effort. After three years of reconstruction, the cathedral reopened on 7 December 2024, and follow-up restoration work on the cathedral's surroundings and interior fittings continued into 2026.

== Background ==
The construction of the Catholic cathedral of Notre-Dame de Paris ("Our Lady of Paris") began in the 12th century. Its walls and interior vaulted ceiling are of stone. Its roof and flèche (spire) were of wood—much of it 13th-century oak—sheathed in lead to exclude water. The spire was rebuilt several times, including in the 19th century.

The cathedral's stonework had been severely eroded by years of weather and pollution, and the spire had extensively rotted because fissures in its lead sheathing were admitting water. The roof timbers were dry, spongy and powdery with age. In 2014, the Ministry of Culture estimated needed renovations at €150 million, and in 2016 the Archdiocese of Paris launched an appeal to raise €100 million over the following five to ten years. At the time of the fire, the spire was undergoing restoration and scaffolding was being erected over the transept.

Extensive attention had been given to the risk of fire at the cathedral. The Paris Fire Brigade drilled regularly to prepare for emergencies there, including on-site exercises in 2018; a firefighter was posted to the cathedral each day; and fire wardens checked conditions beneath the roof three times daily.

Structural elements relevant to the fire
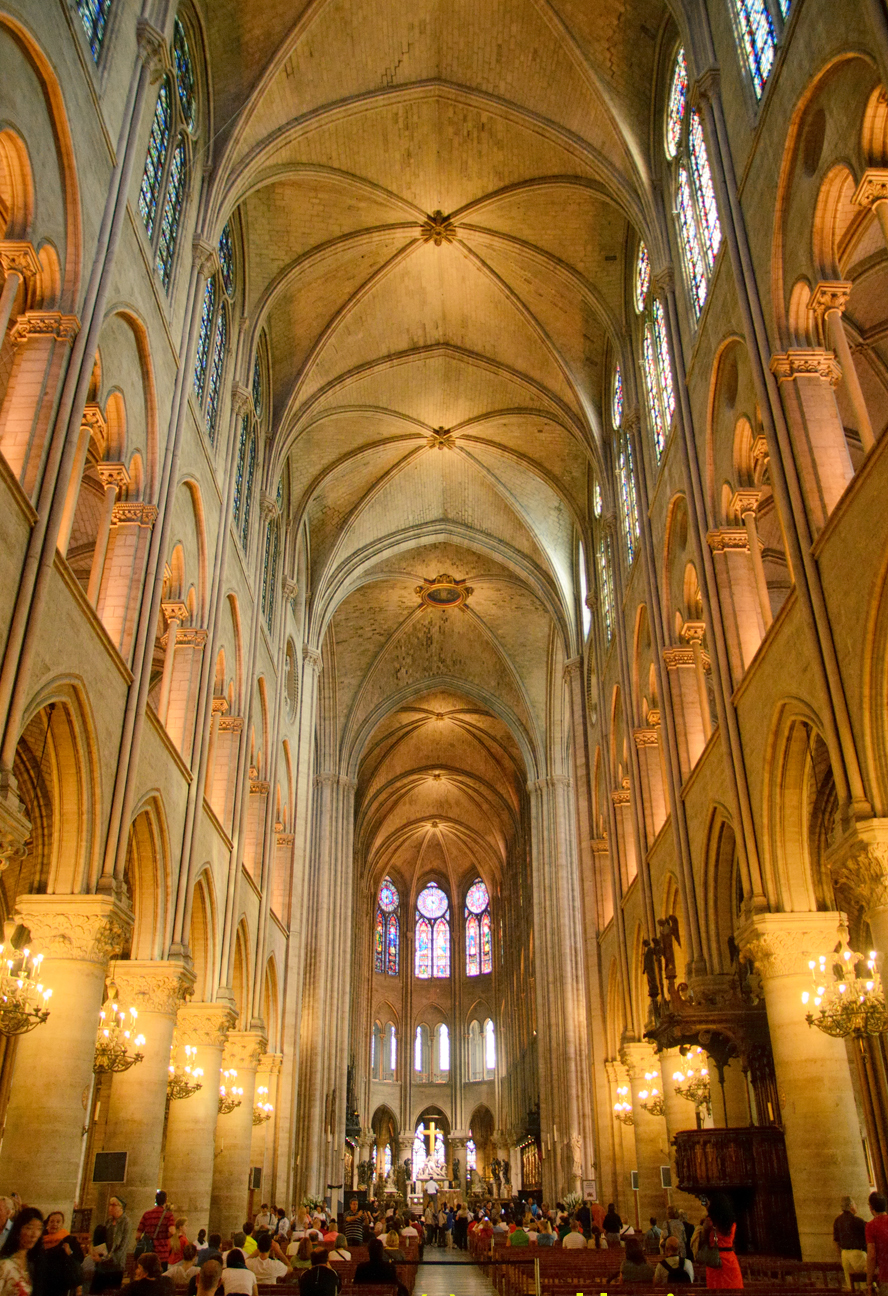
Interior of nave showing rib vaulting; in walls are clerestory windows (top), arches to triforium (middle), and arches to side aisles (bottom).

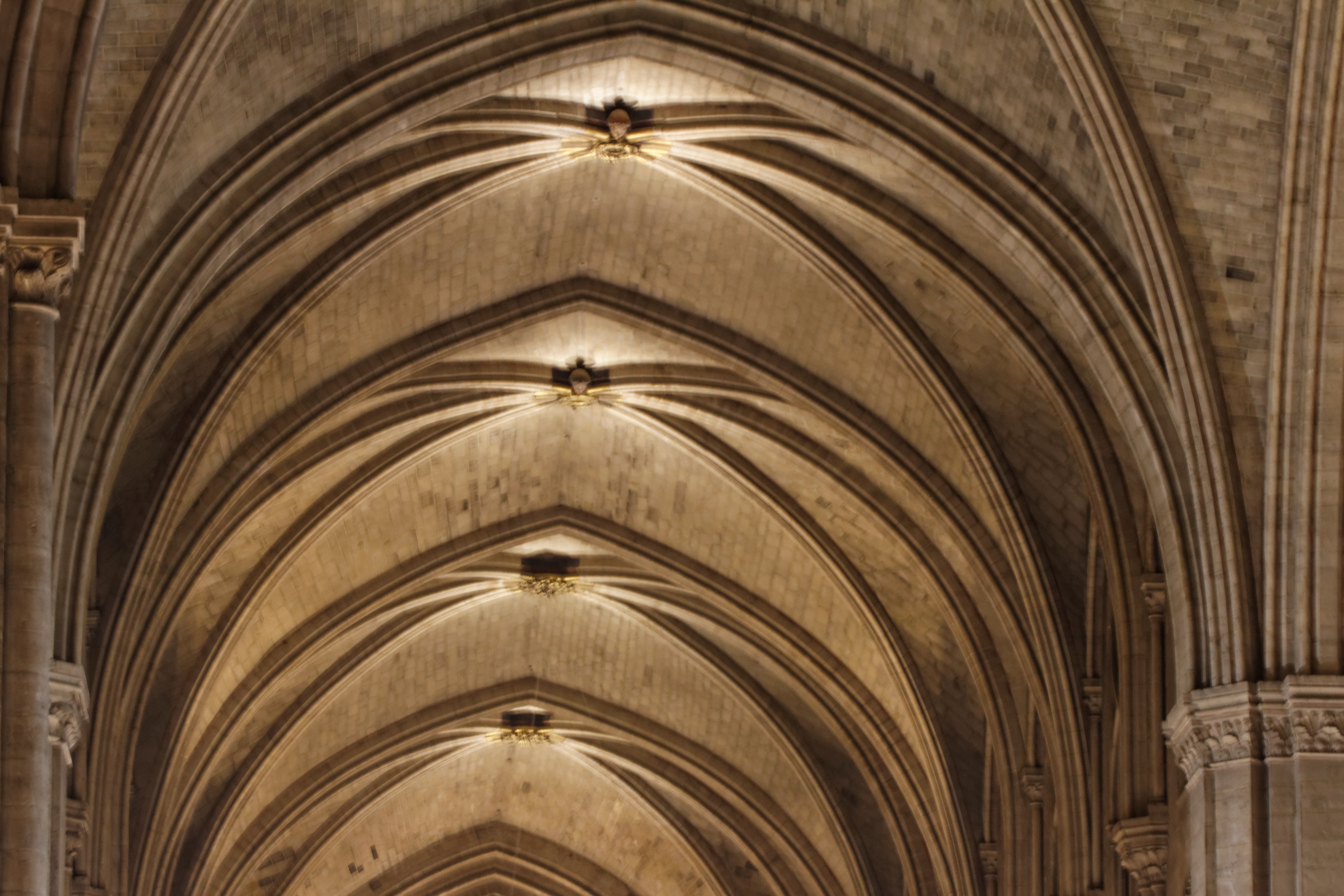
Underside of rib vaulting, whose thrust outward onto the walls is countered by the inward thrust of the flying buttresses. If the vaulting had collapsed, the walls could have collapsed into the nave.

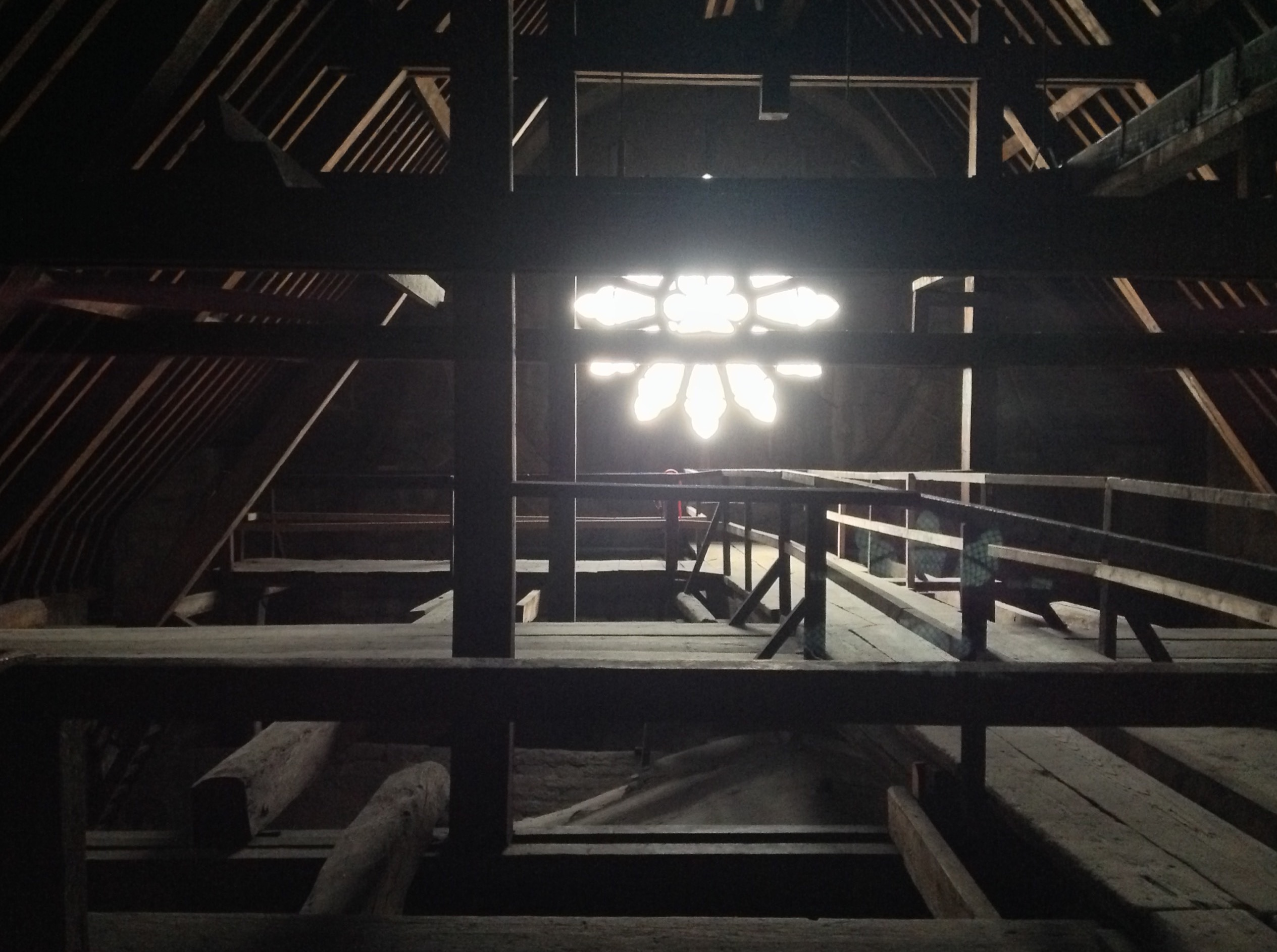
Timber roof framing; vaulted ceiling lies below walkways

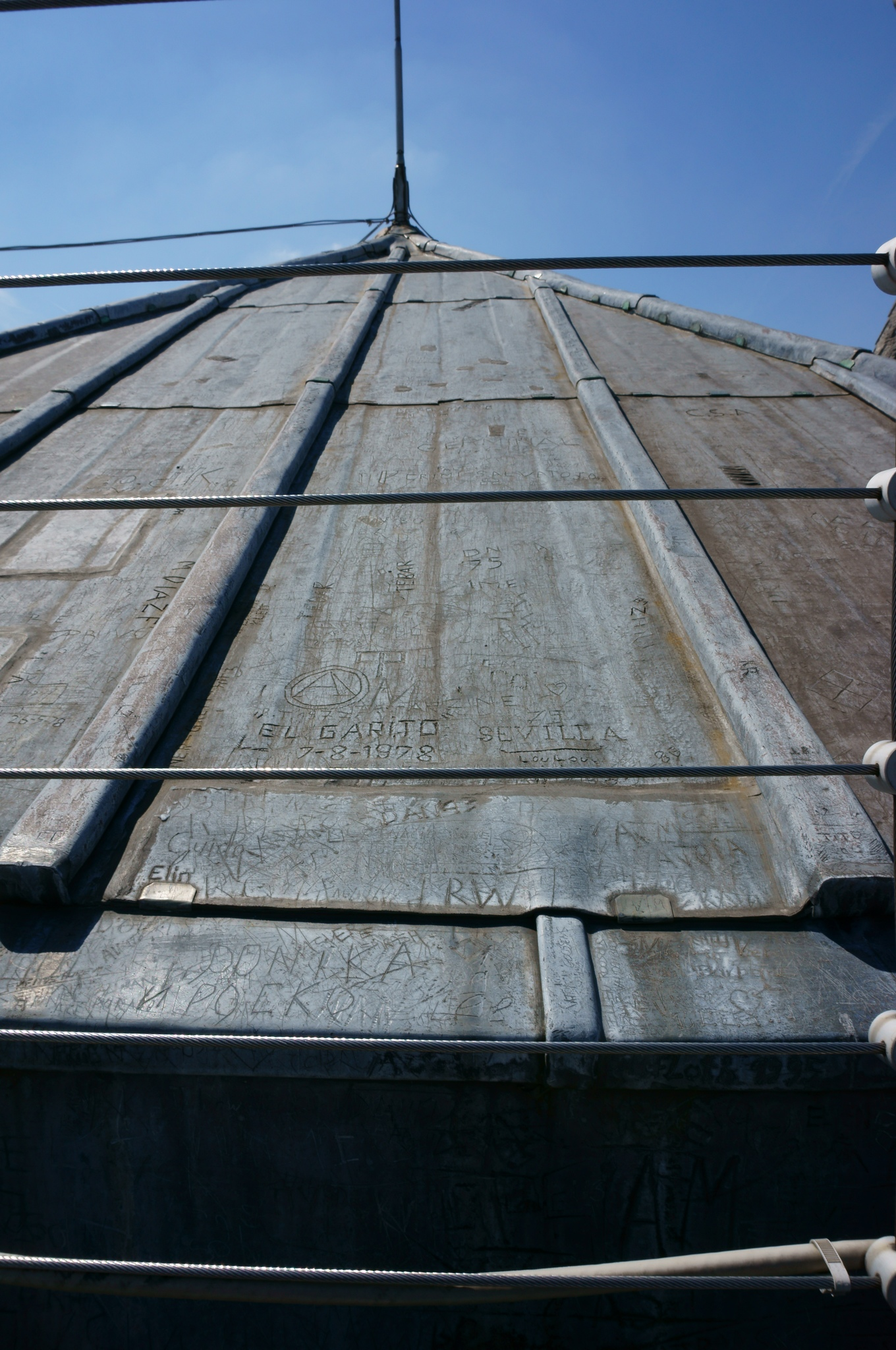
Lead roof sheathing of one of the two towers

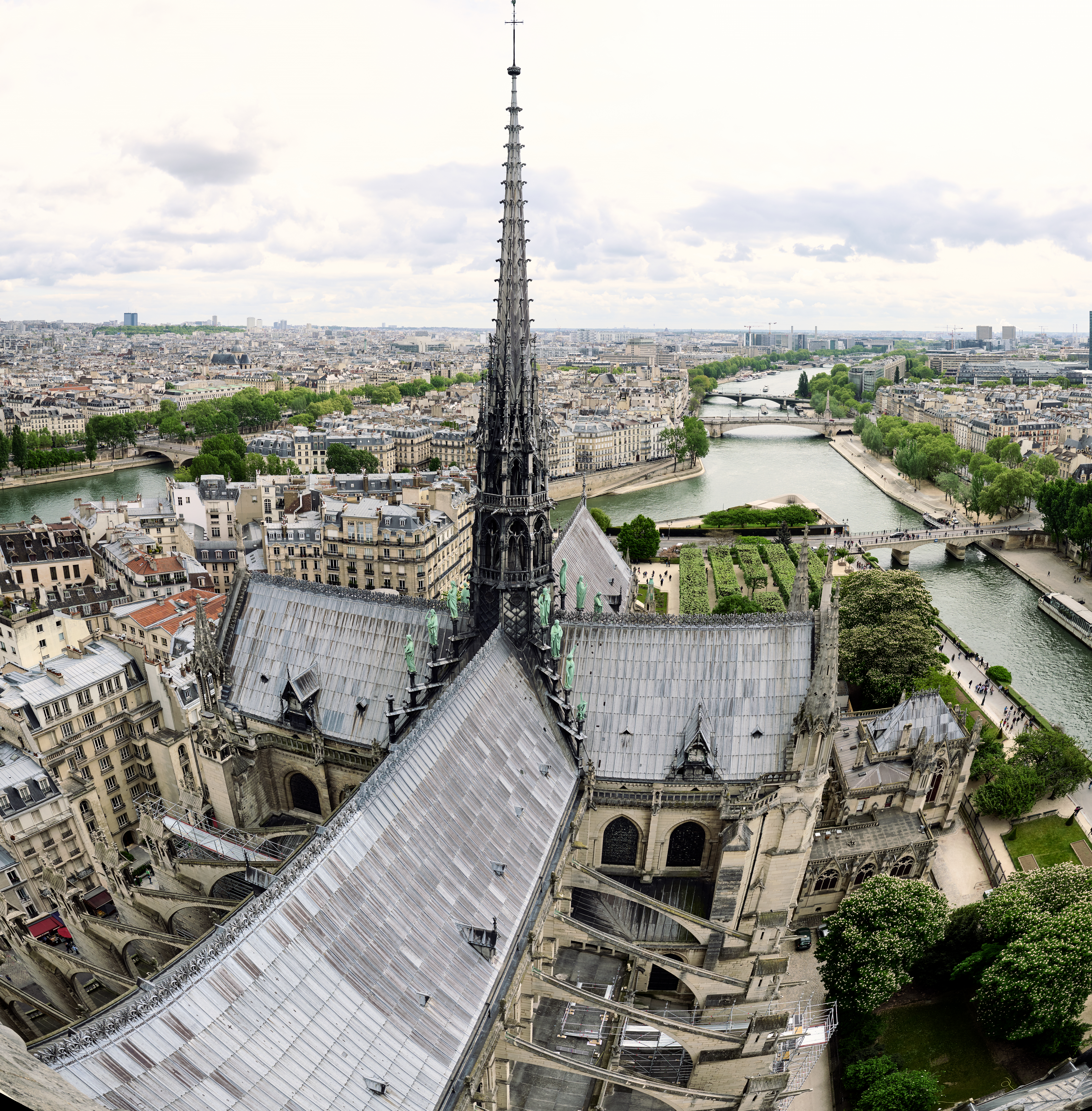
Roof and spire. The Twelve Apostles and Four Evangelists statues at the spire's base had been removed for conservation four days before the fire.

== Fire ==
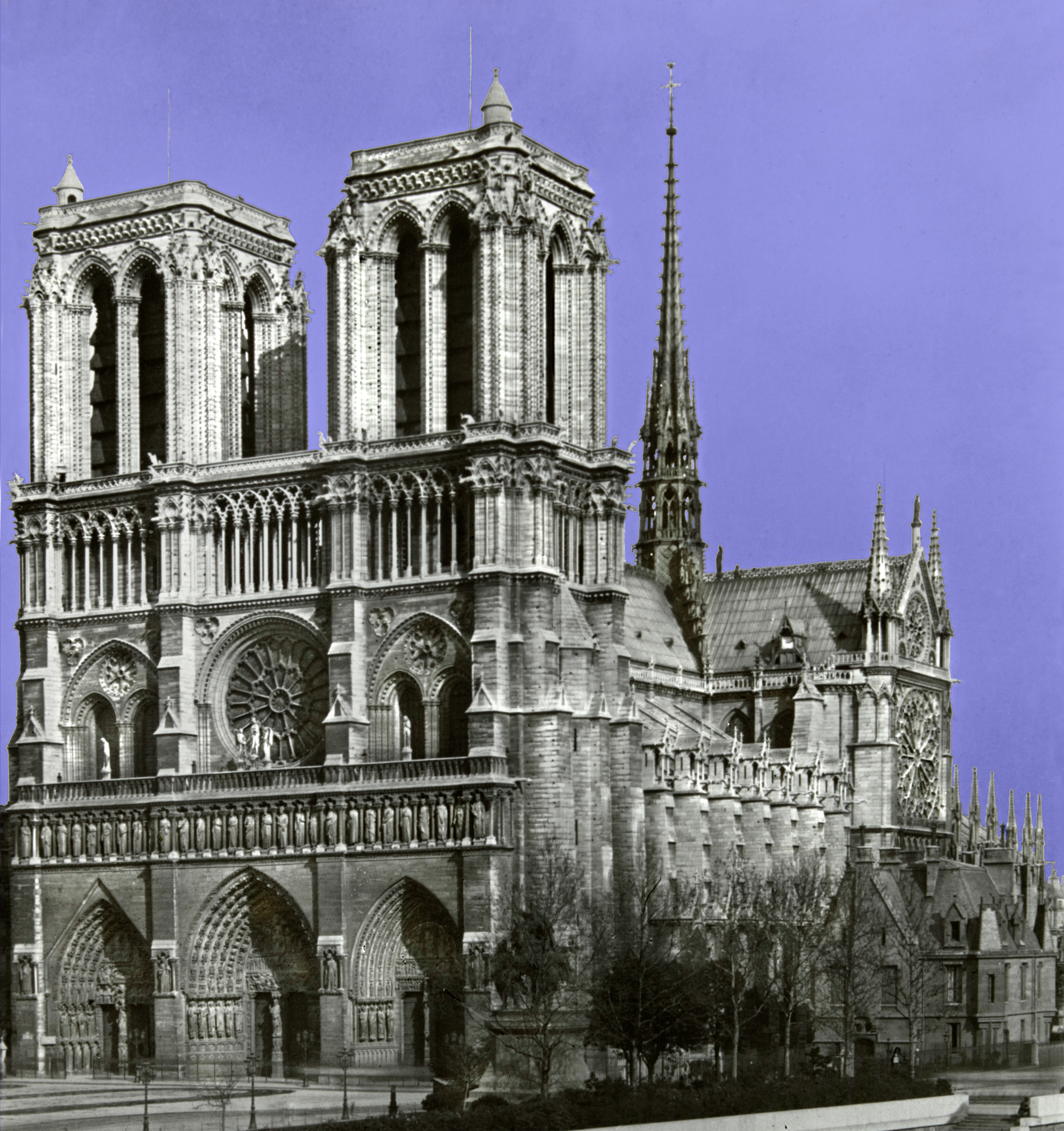
Notre-Dame de Paris c. 1930, with flèche

Fire broke out in the attic beneath the cathedral's roof at 18:18 CEST. At 18:20, the fire alarm sounded and guards evacuated the cathedral; a guard was sent to investigate, but to the wrong location—the attic of the adjoining sacristy—where he found no fire. About fifteen minutes later, the error was discovered, but by the time guards had climbed the three hundred steps to the cathedral attic, the fire was well advanced. The alarm system was not designed to automatically notify the fire brigade, which was summoned at 18:51 after the guards had returned. Firefighters arrived within ten minutes.

Police evacuated the Île de la Cité, the island in the river Seine where the cathedral is located. White smoke was seen rising from the roof, which turned black before flames appeared from the spire, then turned yellow.

=== Firefighting ===
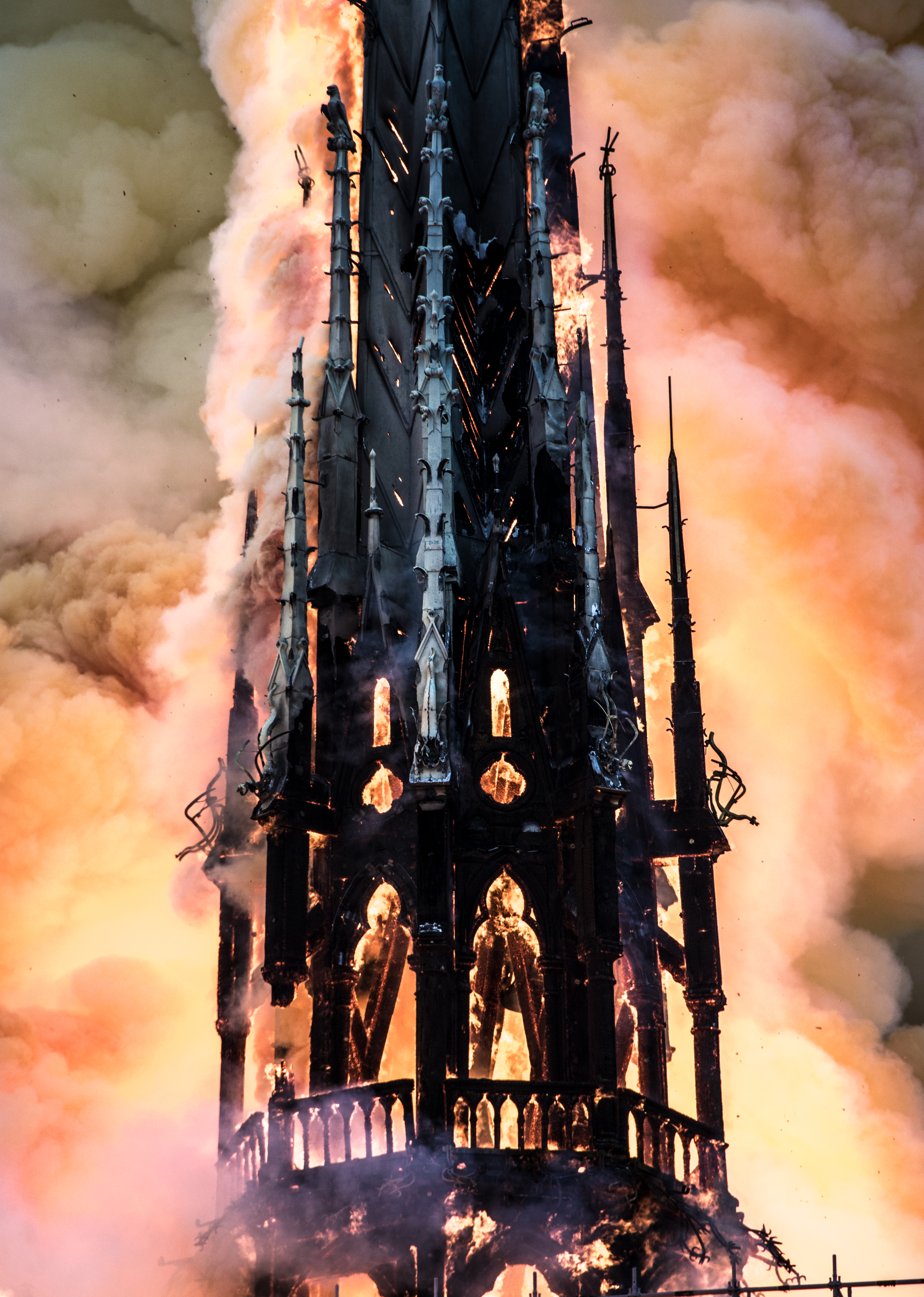
The spire aflame

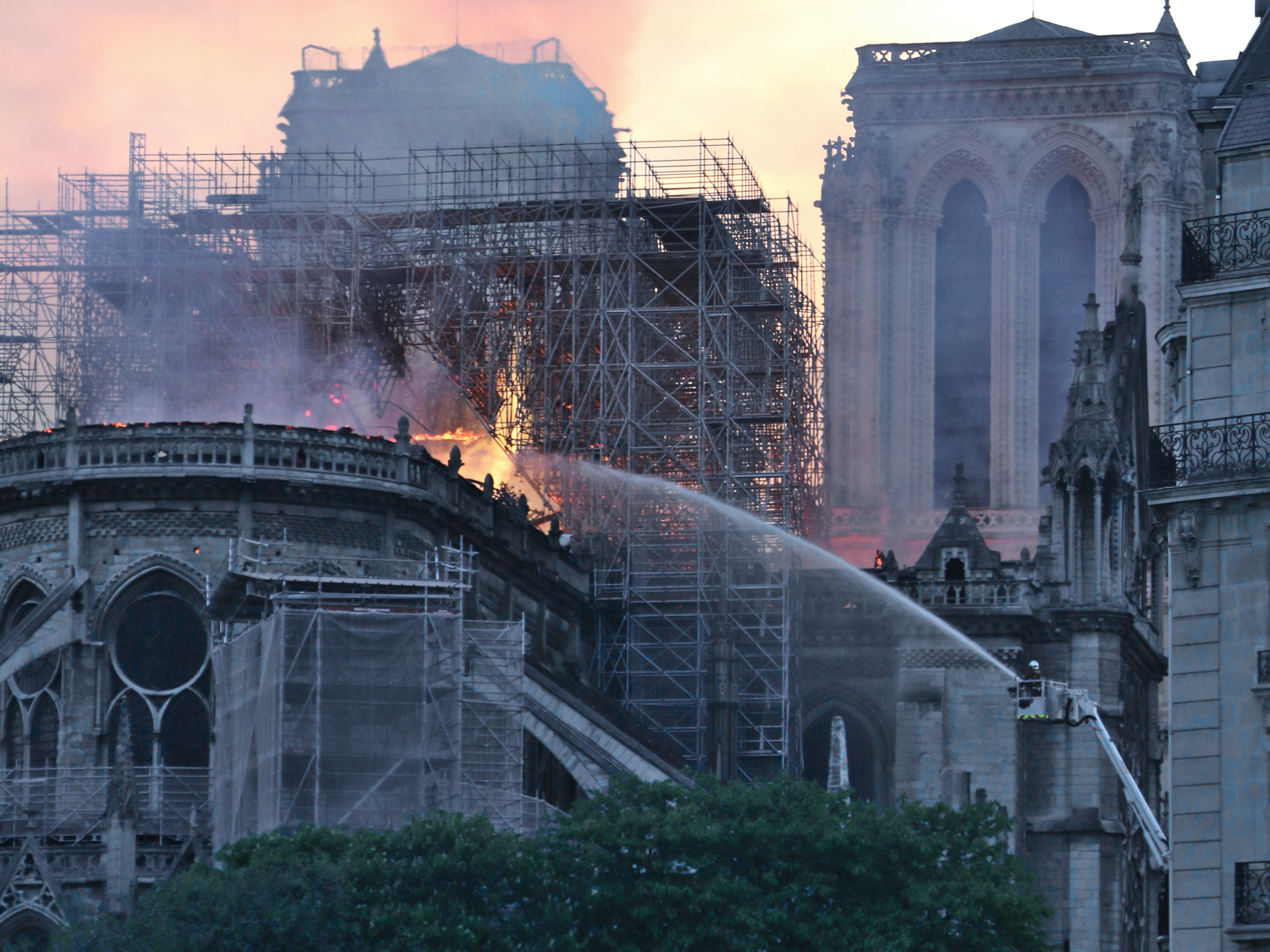
Firefighters using a deluge gun

More than 400 firefighters were engaged; another hundred government workers moved precious objects to safety via a human chain also including police and municipal workers.

The fire was primarily fought from inside the structure, which was more dangerous for personnel but reduced potential damage to the cathedral; applying water from outside risked deflecting flames and hot gases (at temperatures up to 800 °C or 1500 °F) inwards. Deluge guns were used at lower-than-usual pressures to minimise damage to the cathedral and its contents, with water that was supplied by pump-boat from the Seine.

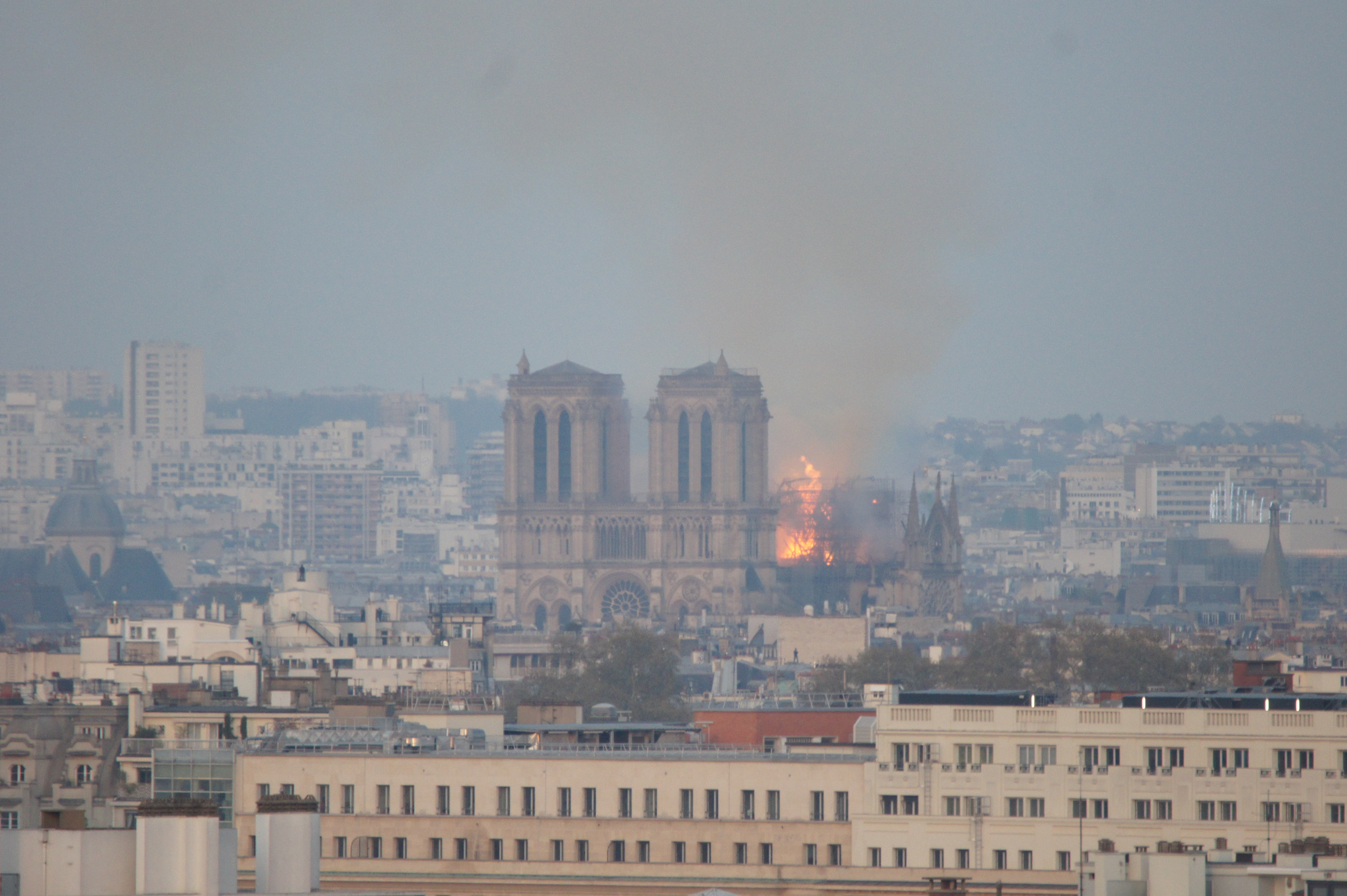
The fire visible from afar

Aerial firefighting was not used because water dropped from heights could have caused structural damage, and heated stone can crack if suddenly cooled. Helicopters were not used because of dangerous updrafts, but drones were used for visual and thermal imaging, and robots were used for visual imaging and directing water streams. Molten lead falling from the roof posed a special hazard for firefighters.

By 18:52, smoke was visible from outside; flames appeared in the next ten minutes, as firefighters arrived. The spire of the cathedral collapsed at 19:50, creating a draft that slammed all the doors and sent a fireball through the attic. Firefighters then retreated from within the attic and concentrated on fighting the fire from the ground.

Shortly before the spire fell, the fire had spread to the wooden framework inside the north tower, which supported eight very large bells. Had the bells fallen, it was thought that the damage done as they fell could have collapsed the north tower and then the south tower, and with them the entire cathedral. At 20:30, firefighters abandoned attempts to extinguish the roof and concentrated on saving the towers. Despite the risk of being caught in a collapse, a firefighter squad volunteered to attempt to put out the fire in the north tower, fighting from within and between the towers. Fourth Arrondissement Mayor Ariel Weil stated: "At that point, it was clear that some firefighters were going to go into the cathedral without knowing if they would come back out." By 21:45, the fire was under control.

Adjacent apartment buildings were evacuated owing to concern about possible collapse, but on 19 April the fire brigade ruled out that risk. One firefighter and two police officers were injured.

=== Damage ===
Animation showing the south facade before and after the fire; scaffolding had been erected as part of renovations underway when the fire started.

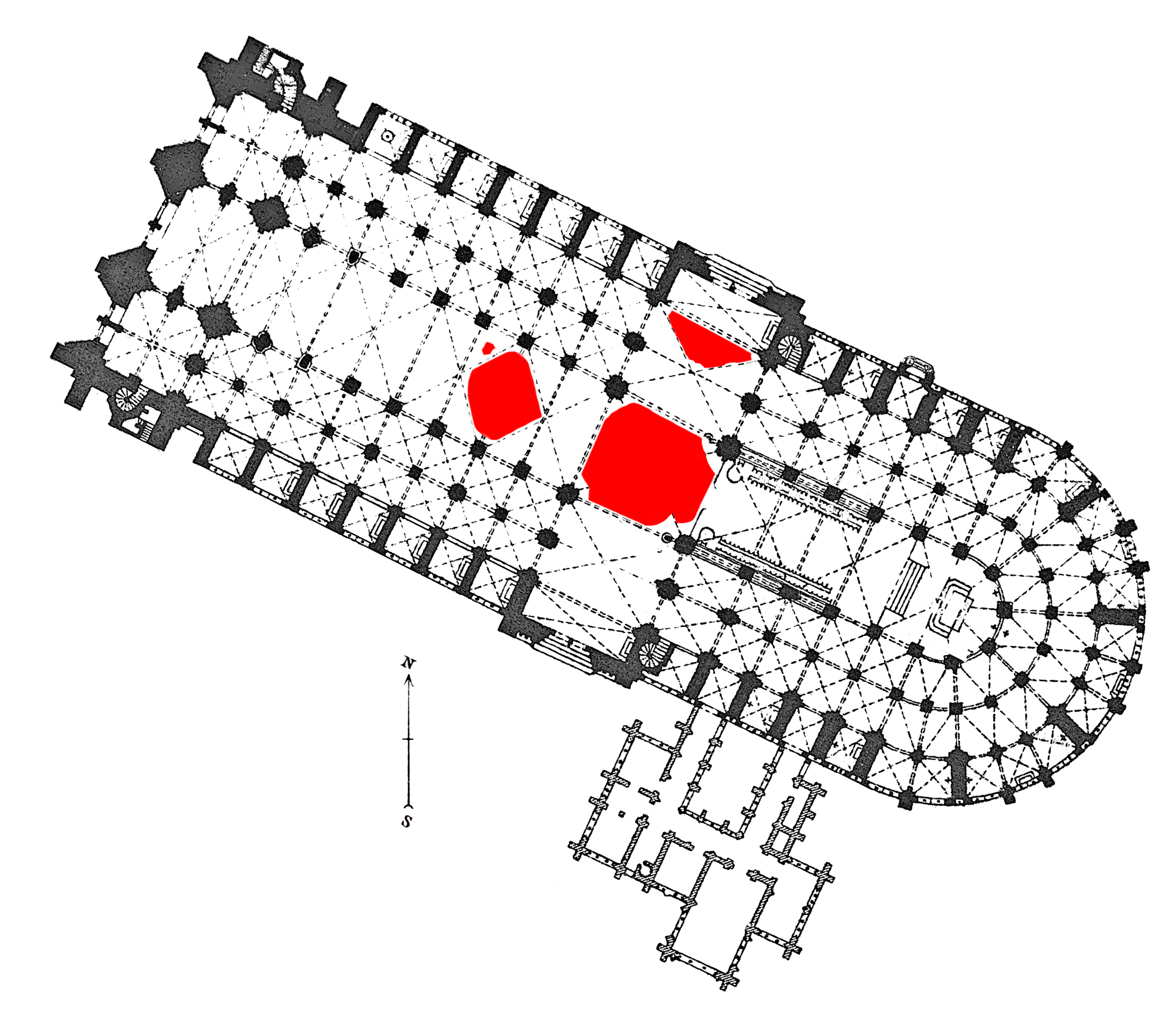
The area directly under the crossing and two other cells of vaulting collapsed.

The roof reduced to piles of char atop the mostly intact vaults

Most of the wood/metal roof and the spire of the cathedral was destroyed, with about one third of the roof remaining. The remnants of the roof and spire fell atop the stone vault underneath, which forms the ceiling of the cathedral's interior. Some sections of this vaulting collapsed in turn, allowing debris from the burning roof to fall to the marble floor below, but most sections remained intact owing to the use of rib vaulting, greatly reducing damage to the cathedral's interior and objects within.

The cathedral contained a large number of artworks, religious relics, and other irreplaceable treasures, including a crown of thorns said to be the one Jesus wore at his crucifixion, a purported piece of the cross on which Jesus was crucified, the Tunic of Saint Louis, a much-rebuilt pipe organ by Aristide Cavaillé-Coll, and the 14th-century Virgin of Paris statue.

Some artwork had been removed in preparation for the renovations, and most of the cathedral's sacred relics were held in the adjoining sacristy, which the fire did not reach; all the cathedral's relics survived. For the cathedral's reopening, a new reliquary for the crown of thorns was unveiled, designed by Sylvain Dubuisson and installed in the axial chapel at the cathedral's eastern end; the relic is displayed within a blue half-sphere encircled by glass cross motifs and is otherwise kept locked inside the reliquary's marble base, being brought out only for major liturgical occasions such as Advent, Easter, and Christmas. Some contents were moved by a human chain of emergency workers and civil servants. Many valuables that were not removed also survived, but the state of many others remained unknown in the days immediately following the fire.

Lead joints in some of the 19th-century stained-glass windows melted, but the three major rose windows, dating to the 13th century, were undamaged. Several pews were destroyed, and the vaulted arches were blackened by smoke, though the church's main cross and altar survived, along with the statues surrounding it.

Some paintings, apparently only smoke-damaged, were transported to the Louvre for restoration and later returned to the cathedral ahead of its reopening. A number of statues, including those of the twelve Apostles and four Evangelists at the base of the spire, had been removed in preparation for renovations days before the fire; they were kept at the Cité de l'Architecture et du Patrimoine during the restoration and returned to the spire in April 2025. The rooster-shaped reliquary atop the spire was found damaged but intact among the debris. The three pipe organs were not significantly damaged; the great organ was nonetheless dismantled, cleaned of lead dust, and reassembled and tuned by 2024 in time for the reopening. The largest of the cathedral's bells, the bourdon, was not damaged. The liturgical treasury of the cathedral and the large-format "May" paintings were moved to safety.

==== Environmental damage ====
Airparif, an air quality monitoring organization, said winds rapidly dispersed the smoke, carrying it away aloft along the Seine corridor. The organization did not find elevated levels of particulate air pollution at monitoring stations nearby. The Paris police stated that there was no danger from breathing the air around the fire.

The burned-down roof had been covered with over 400 metric tonnes of lead. Settling dust substantially raised surface lead levels in some places nearby, notably the cordoned-off area and places left open during the fire. Wet cleaning for surfaces and blood tests for children and pregnant women were recommended in the immediate area. People working on the cathedral after the fire did not initially take the required lead precautions; materials leaving the site were decontaminated, but some clothing was not, and some precautions were not correctly followed; as a result, the worksite failed some inspections and was temporarily shut down. There was also more widespread contamination; testing, cleanup, and public health advisories were delayed for months, and the neighbourhood was not decontaminated for four months, prompting widespread criticism.

Average lead levels in Paris streets are normally five times the indoor legal limit (1,000 micrograms per square metre; 0.0014 gr/sq ft) owing to historic uses of lead, principally from runoff from intact roofs. The Health Ministry rules that children should not be exposed to more than 70 micrograms/m^{2} indoors. There is no legal limit for outdoor lead levels, which are often very heterogeneous; the Regional Health Agency of Ile-de-France was not certain if some of the elevated levels being measured were connected to the fire. This lack of clarity and threshold-linked mandatory measures may have delayed action. In mid-July, regional health officials raised their outdoor guideline from 1,000 micrograms/m^{2} to 5,000. Rain can redistribute the lead dust. Samples of honey collected in July 2019 revealed higher lead concentrations downwind from Notre-Dame and lead isotopes tagged the lead as originating from the fire and not other potential sources of pollutants.

=== Reactions ===
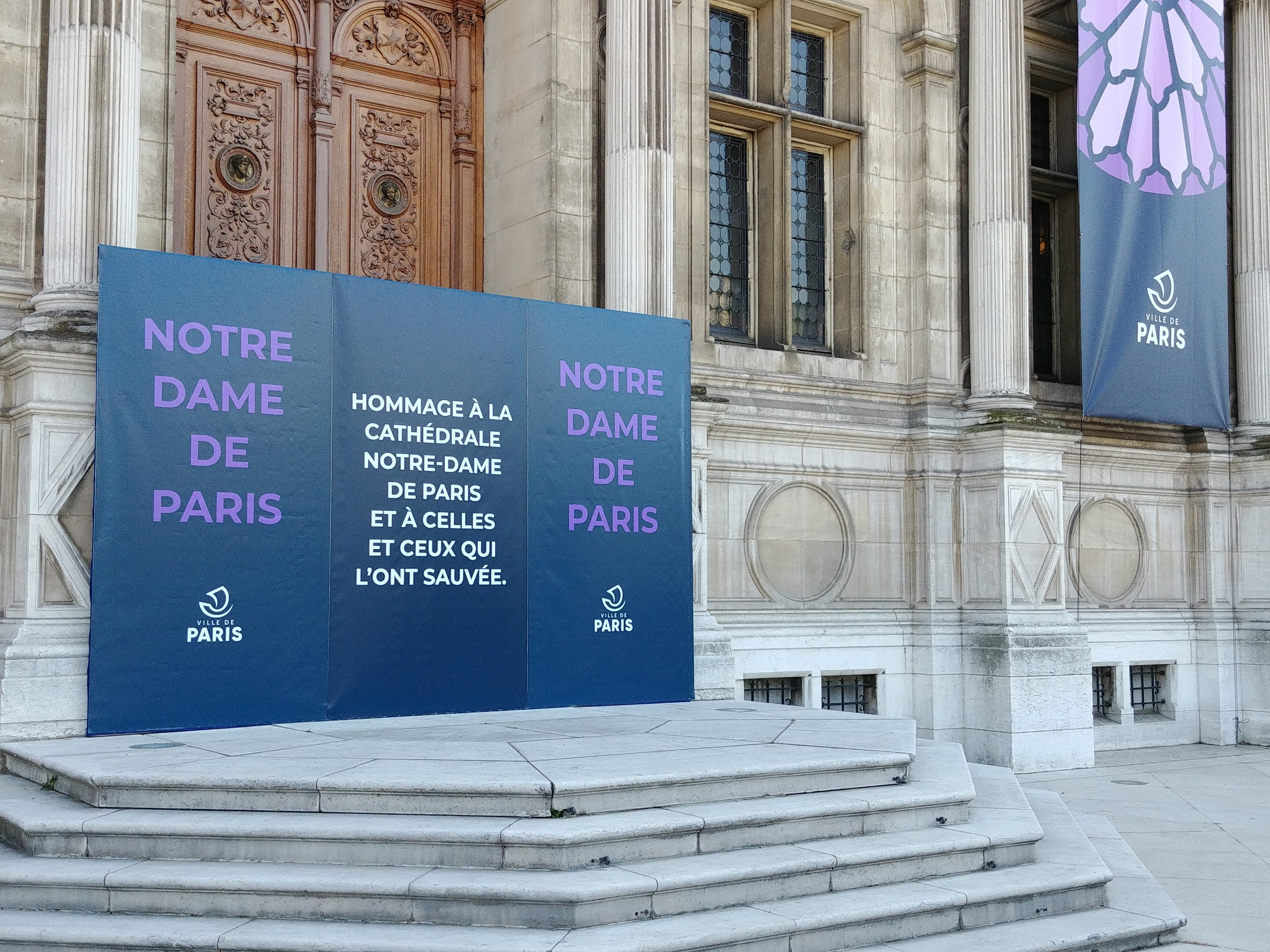
Plaque in front of the Hôtel de Ville, Paris' city hall, in homage to the cathedral and those who helped save it

French president Emmanuel Macron, postponing a speech to address the yellow vests movement planned for that evening, went to Notre-Dame and gave a brief address there. Major religious leaders (Note: They include Pope Francis, Pope Tawadros II of Alexandria, and the President of the Church of Jesus Christ of Latter-day Saints.) and representatives of numerous countries and international organisations (Note: They include Prime Minister of Italy Giuseppe Conte, Queen Elizabeth II of the United Kingdom, Prime Minister of the United Kingdom Theresa May, Minister of Foreign Affairs of Iran Javad Zarif, Chancellor of Germany Angela Merkel, Prime Minister of Spain Pedro Sánchez, Prime Minister of the Netherlands Mark Rutte, President of Portugal Marcelo Rebelo de Sousa, President of Bulgaria Rumen Radev, President of Romania Klaus Iohannis, Prime Minister of Hungary Viktor Orbán, Prime Minister of Greece Alexis Tsipras, Prime Minister of Canada Justin Trudeau, President of the United States Donald Trump, President of the People's Republic of China Xi Jinping, President of Russia Vladimir Putin, President of Israel Reuven Rivlin, King of Bahrain Hamad bin Isa Al Khalifa, Prime Minister of Australia Scott Morrison, King Mohammed VI of Morocco, President of Egypt Abdel Fattah el-Sisi, President of Latvia Raimonds Vējonis, President of Ghana Nana Akufo-Addo, President of Belarus Alexander Lukashenko, President of the Republic of China (Taiwan) Tsai Ing-wen, United Nations Secretary-General António Guterres, President of the European Council Donald Tusk, and President of the European Commission Jean-Claude Juncker.) extended condolences.

Through the night of the fire and into the next day, people gathered along the Seine to hold vigils, sing and pray. Some commentators found deeper meaning in the fire, linking it with divine judgment or the decline of Western civilisation.

The following Sunday at Saint-Eustache Church, the Archbishop of Paris, Michel Aupetit, honoured the firefighters with the presentation of a book of scriptures saved from the fire.

== Investigation ==
On 16 April, the Paris prosecutor said that there was no evidence of a deliberate act, but the cause of the fire had not been proven yet.

The fire has been compared to the similar 1992 Windsor Castle fire and the Uppark fire, among others, and has raised old questions about the safety of similar structures and the techniques used to restore them.

Renovation presents a fire risk from sparks, short circuits, and heat from welding (roof repairs involved cutting and soldering lead sheets resting on timber). Normally, no electrical material is allowed in the roof space because of the extreme fire risk. The roof framing was made of very dry timber, often powdery with age. After the fire, the architect responsible for fire safety at the cathedral acknowledged that the rate at which fire might spread had been underestimated, and experts said that it was well known that a fire in the roof would be almost impossible to control.

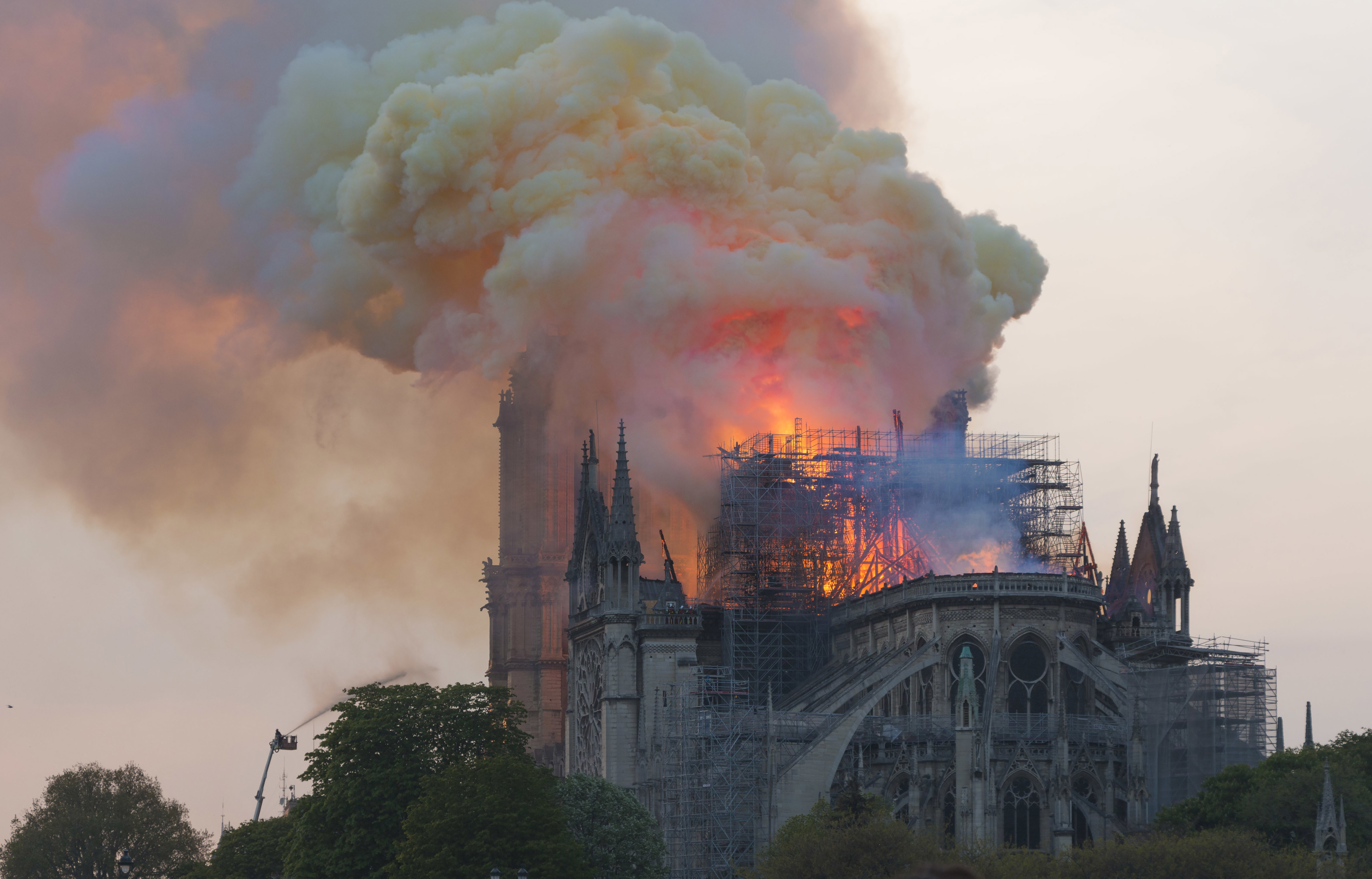
The fire seen from Pont de la Tournelle

Of the firms working on the restoration, a Europe Echafaudage team was the only one working there on the day of the fire. The company claimed that no soldering or welding had occurred in the period just before the fire. The scaffolding was receiving electrical supply for temporary elevators and lighting. The roofing company, Le Bras Frères, claimed that it had followed procedure and that none of its personnel were on site when the fire began. Time-lapse images taken by a camera installed by the roofing company showed smoke first rising from the base of the spire.

On 25 April 2019, the structure was considered safe enough for entry of investigators, who unofficially stated that they were considering theories involving malfunction of the electric bell-ringing apparatus and cigarette butts discovered on the renovation scaffolding. Le Bras Frères confirmed that its workers had smoked cigarettes, contrary to regulations, but denied that a cigarette butt could have started the fire. The Paris prosecutor's office announced on 26 June that no evidence had been found to suggest a criminal motive.

The security employee monitoring the alarm system was new on the job, and was working a second eight-hour shift that day because his relief had not arrived. Additionally, the fire alarm system used to locate fires was labeled in a confusing manner, which contributed to the initial confusion about the location of the fire.

By September 2019, the determination of the exact origin of the fire was expected to take a great deal more time and work. By 15 April 2020, investigators believed the fire "to have been started by either a cigarette or a short circuit in the electrical system". No definitive cause has since been established.

== Reconstruction ==
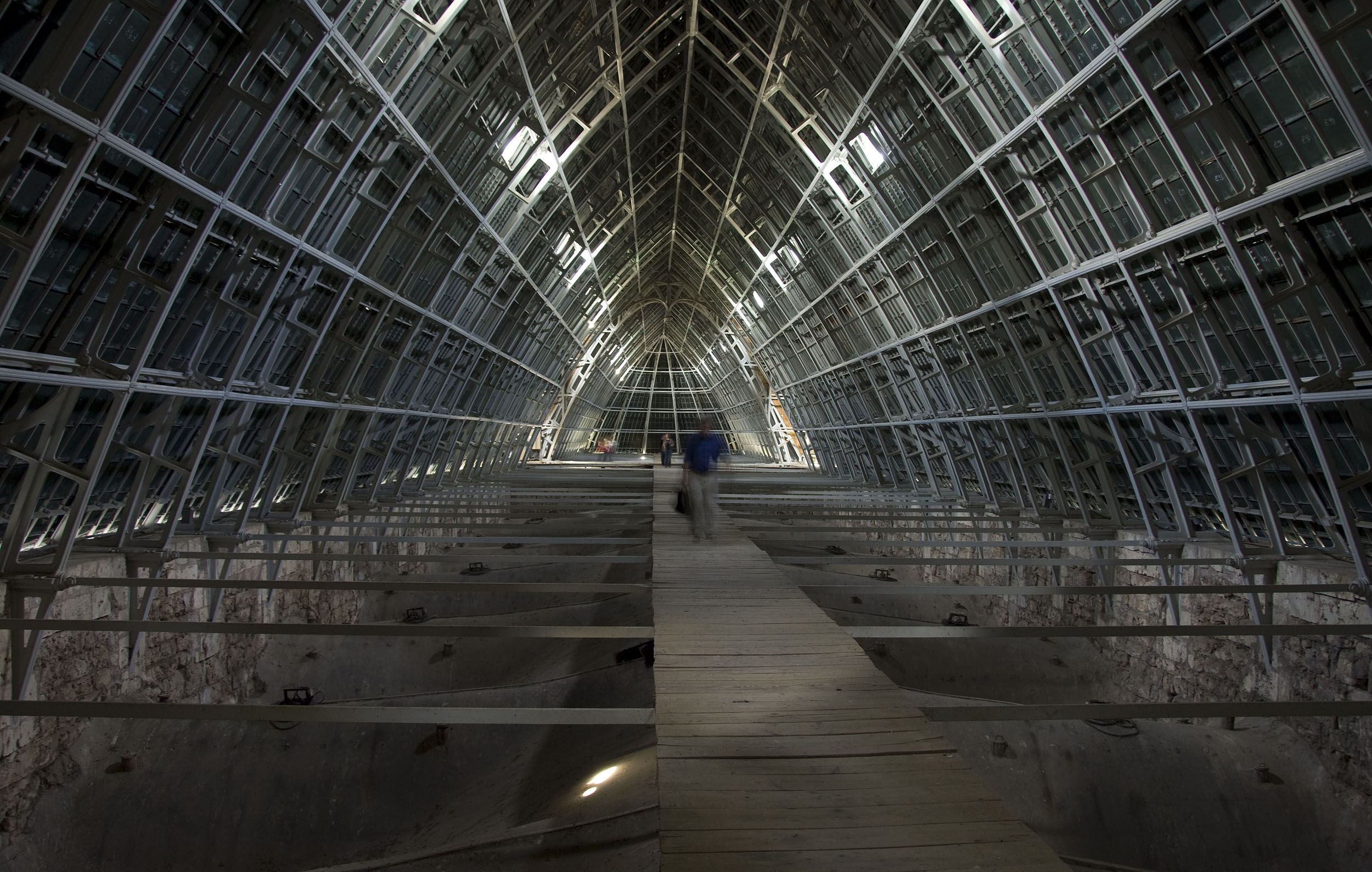
Chartres Cathedral was rebuilt with wrought iron trusses and copper sheeting after an 1836 fire.

On the night of the fire, Macron said that the cathedral would be rebuilt, and launched an international fundraising campaign. France's cathedrals have been owned by the state since 1905, and are not privately insured.

The heritage conservation organisation Fondation du Patrimoine estimated the damage in the hundreds of millions of euros. Although art in the building and multiple construction companies were insured, according to the organisation's president Robert Leblanc, losses from the fire did not substantially affect the insurance industry. European art insurers stated the cost would be similar to ongoing renovations of the Palace of Westminster in London, which was estimated to be around €7 billion. This cost did not include damage to any of the artwork or artefacts within the cathedral; art insurers said any pieces on loan from other museums would have been insured, but the works owned by the cathedral would not have been insurable.

Macron had hoped the cathedral could be restored in time for the 2024 Summer Olympics in Paris, a target that was ultimately met for the building's reopening, although ancillary restoration work continued afterward. The repairs balanced the desires to restore the look of the original building, to use wood and stone from the regions used in the original construction, and to use a structure that would not collapse again.

There was discussion of whether to reconstruct the cathedral in modified form. Rebuilding the roof with titanium sheets and steel trusses had been suggested; other options included rebuilding in the original lead and wood, rebuilding with modern materials not visible from the outside (like the reinforced concrete trusses at Reims Cathedral), or using a combination of restored old elements and newly designed ones. In the end, the roof and spire were rebuilt largely in the original materials and form—oak timber sheathed in lead—rather than in steel, titanium, or concrete.

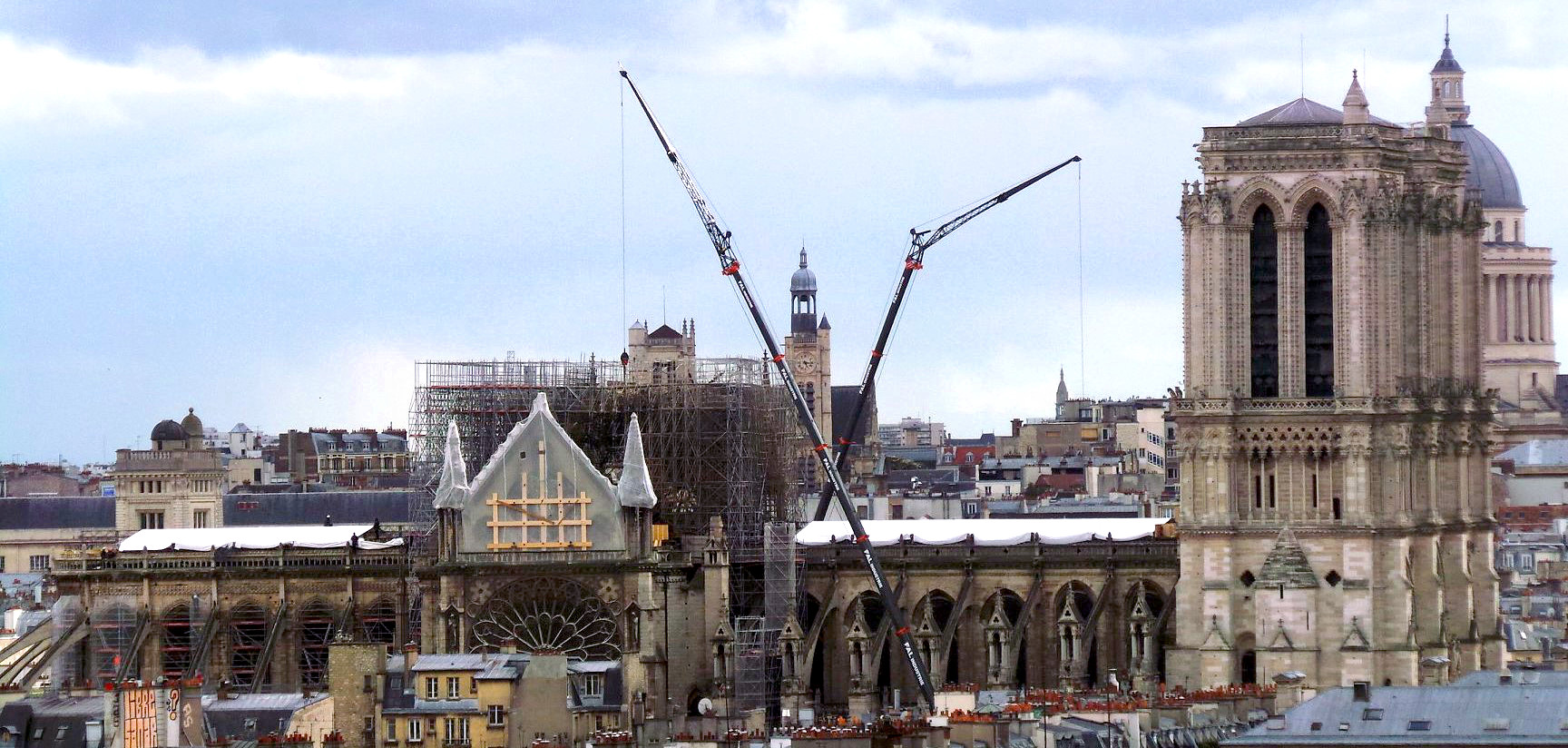
White tarpaulins over metal beams were quickly rigged to protect the interior from the elements. Nettings protect the destabilised exterior.

French prime minister Édouard Philippe announced an architectural design competition for a new spire "adapted to the techniques and the challenges of our era." The spire replacement project gathered a variety of designs and some controversy, particularly its legal exemption from environmental and heritage rules. After the design competition was announced, the French Senate amended the government's proposed restoration bill to require the roof to be restored to how it was before the fire. The National Assembly rejected this amendment, and on 16 July 2019, 95 days after the fire, the law that governed the restoration of the cathedral was approved by the Parliament. It recognised its UNESCO World Heritage Site status and the need to respect existing international charters and practices, to "preserve the historic, artistic and architectural history of the monument", and to limit any derogations to the existing heritage, planning, environmental and construction codes to a minimum. It left the architectural form of the reconstruction and the spire design undetermined.

Jean-Louis Georgelin, a retired high-ranking French general, was appointed in 2020 to oversee the cathedral's reconstruction; he died on 18 August 2023, and was succeeded by civil servant Philippe Jost. On 15 April 2020, Germany offered to restore "some of the large clerestory windows located far above eye level" with three expert tradesmen who specialize in rebuilding cathedrals. Monika Grütters, Germany's Commissioner for Culture, was quoted as saying "her country would shoulder the costs".

The ongoing status of the restoration was posted regularly by the organisation Friends of Notre-Dame de Paris.

Macron visited the cathedral on 15 April 2022, the third anniversary of the fire. Macron toured the site where work was being carried out to restore the landmark and spoke to those undertaking the project about their progress. In the spring of 2022, eight workshops of master glassmakers and locksmiths, selected across France, began the process of cleaning and restoration of the cathedral's stained glass windows. The Cologne Cathedral workshop from Germany joined the effort by restoring four of the stained glass windows. Macron led a video unveiling of the reconstructed building on 29 November 2024, a week ahead of the planned reopening on 7 December 2024.

On 7 December 2024, Notre-Dame reopened following the completion of the principal reconstruction effort. A third phase of restoration work, covering items not required for the reopening, continued on a 2025–2028 timeline. During 2025, this work covered the chevet (the apse, choir, and radiating chapels), consolidation of the flying buttresses, and restoration of the exterior of the Viollet-le-Duc sacristy. A set of new stained-glass windows for chapels along the south aisle, on the theme of Pentecost and designed by a contemporary artist selected from a shortlist that included Daniel Buren, began installation through 2026, with the cathedral's existing 19th-century windows being transferred to a museum collection. The cathedral's sound system, by the German acoustics specialist Sennheiser, was finalised in February 2026. Restoration of the forecourt and its approach, including new landscaping under Belgian architect and landscape designer Bas Smets, remains scheduled for completion in 2027.

=== Fundraising ===
By 22 April 2019, donations of over €1 billion had been pledged for the cathedral's reconstruction, at least €880 million of that in less than a day after Macron's appeal. Pledges €10M and over include:

- Arnault family & LVMH (€200M)
- Bettencourt family & L'Oréal (€200M)
- Pinault family & Artémis (€100M)
- Total SA (€100M)
- Paris city government (€50M)
- BNP Paribas SA (€20M)
- Decaux family & JCDecaux (€20M)
- AXA SA (€10M)
- Lily Safra (€10M)
- Bouygues family (€10M)
- De Lacharrière family & FIMALAC (€10M)
- Île-de-France (€10M)
- Société Générale (€10M)
- BPCE (€10M)

There were many additional pledges for smaller, or undisclosed, amounts. A proposal by former minister Jean-Jacques Aillagon that corporate donations for Notre-Dame should get a 90% tax deduction (rather than the standard 60%) was retracted after public outcry. Some donors said they would not seek tax deductions. Donors exempted from income tax (more than half of French taxpayers, including working- and middle-class) were not eligible for such deductions.

By 14 June 2019, only €80 million had been collected. The minister in charge of national museums and monuments, Franck Riester, predicted that further donations would materialise as reconstruction work progressed, and it was reported that some who made pledges renounced them because fundraising had been so successful. By September 2021 at least 320,000 donors had contributed over €840 million to the rebuilding effort.

== In popular culture ==
The fire was the subject of the 2022 French disaster film Notre-Dame on Fire directed by Jean-Jacques Annaud.

The fire appears in the epilogue of the 2025 horror novel King Sorrow written by American author Joe Hill.

In 2026 singer/songwriter Morrissey released the track "Notre Dame" referencing the fire.

== See also ==
- 1984 York Minster fire
- 2009 St Mel's Cathedral fire
- 2019 Shuri Castle fire
- 2024 Børsen fire
- Construction and renovation fires
- List of building or structure fires
- List of destroyed heritage
- List of fires at major places of worship
