= Journal of Asian Earth Sciences =

- Discipline: Earth sciences
- Language: English

Publication details
- Publisher: Elsevier
- Impact factor: 3.449 (2020)

Standard abbreviations
- ISO 4: J. Asian Earth Sci.

Indexing
- ISSN: 1367-9120

Links
- Journal homepage

The Journal of Asian Earth Sciences is a peer-reviewed scientific journal specializing in Earth processes with a focus on aspects of research related to Asia. The journal is published by Elsevier.

According to the Journal Citation Reports, the journal has a 2020 impact factor of 3.449.

As of May 2022 the editor-in-chief is Mei-Fu Zhou (Chinese Academy of Sciences).
