= Construction and renovation fires =

Type of fire

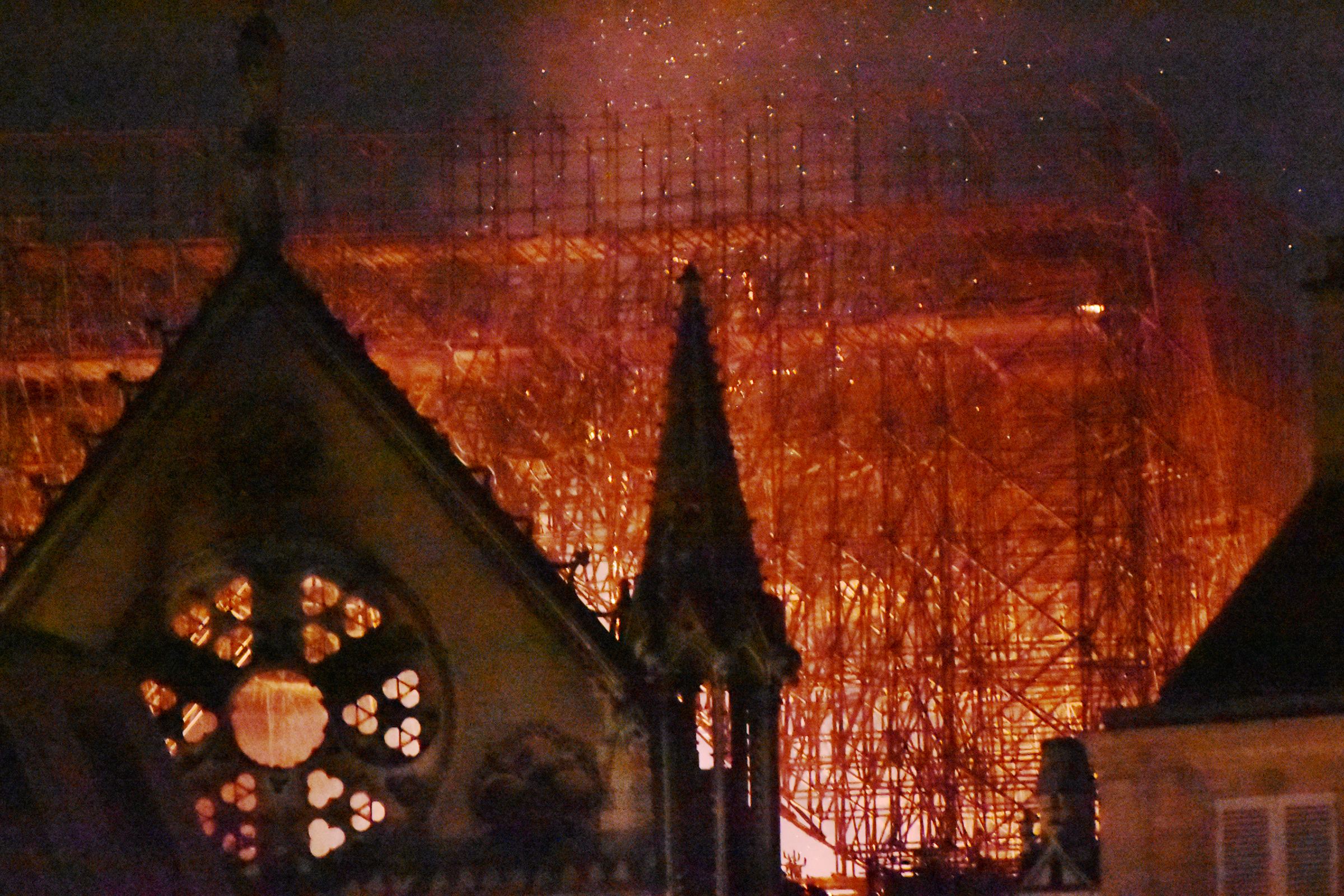
Fire backlights a renovation scaffold during the 2019 Notre-Dame de Paris fire.

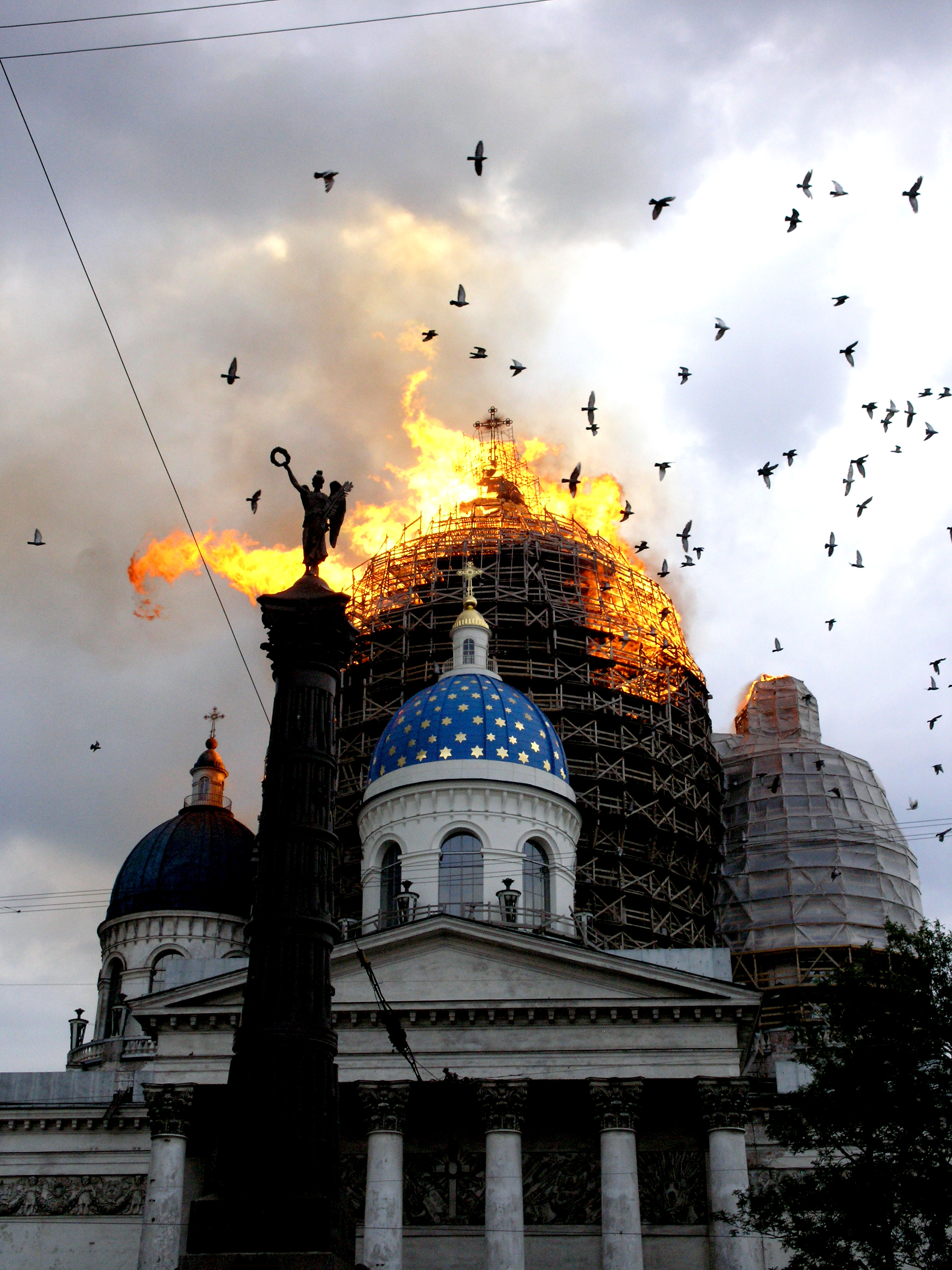
Trinity Cathedral, Saint Petersburg in 2006; a fire started in the scaffolding

Construction and renovation are common circumstances for fires, which present particular difficulties to firefighters.

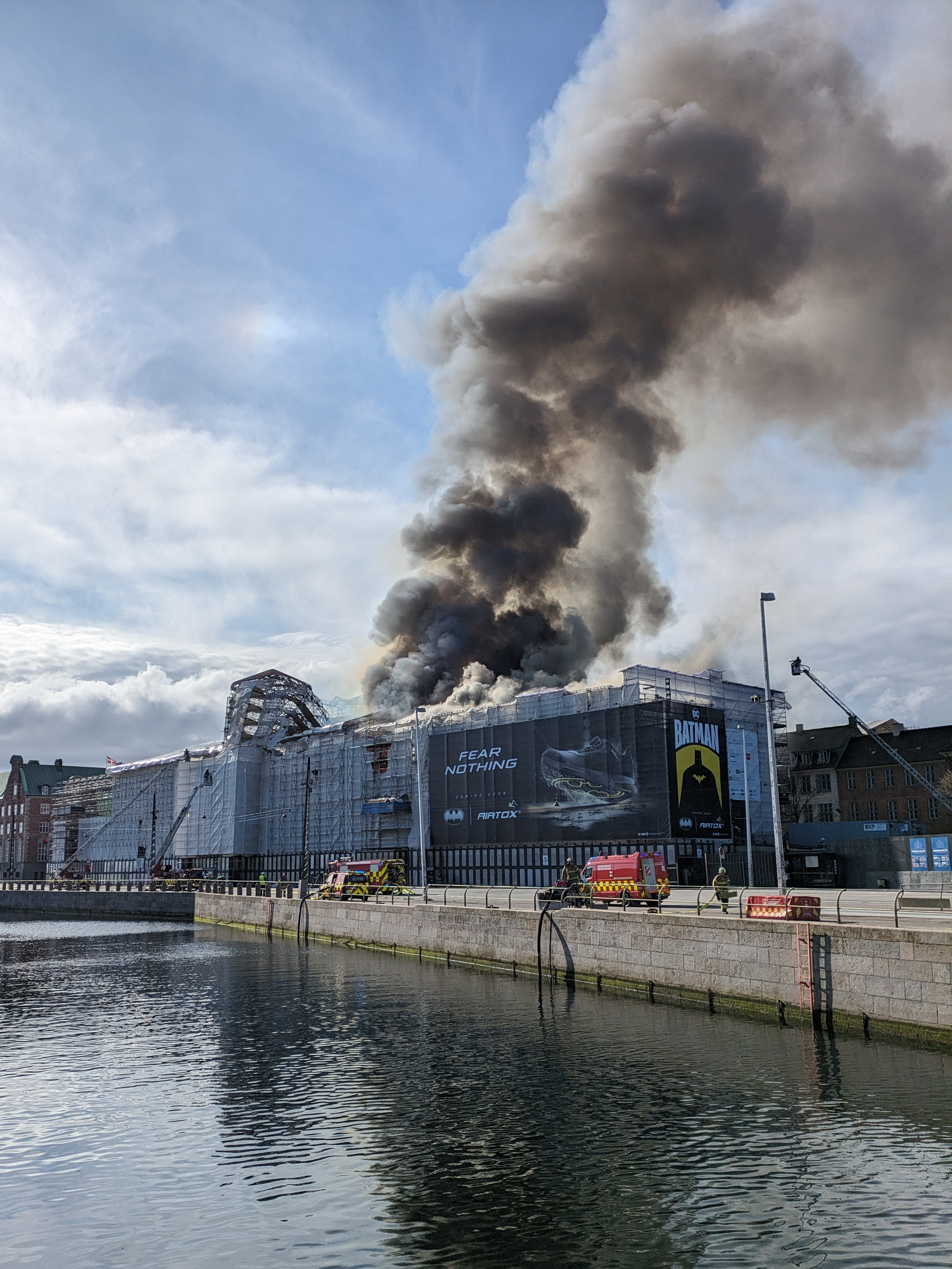
Børsen fire, April 2024, Copenhagen, Denmark

During construction, buildings often do not have elements that would protect them from fire, such as walls and sprinkler systems. Poor water supplies and the accumulation of flammable materials also present risks. Works often require heat or even open flame, and these can set off fires that smoulder for hours before being noticed. For this reason, work sites may need 24-hour fire watches.

Builder's risk insurance may cover damage from such fires.

== Table ==
Legend
Probable cause found
Cause unknown
Under investigation

Notable construction and renovation fires of buildings
| Fire | Date | Probable cause | Refs |
|---|---|---|---|
| Saint Boniface Cathedral | 1968 | started in roof by worker's cigarette | |
| Nantes Cathedral | 1972 | an oxy-fuel torch used in the attic | |
| Montreal Biosphere | 1976 | spark from a welding torch being used on steel girders; welder's extinguisher proved empty, so fire spread to the acrylic glazing | |
| Hotel Margaret, Brooklyn | 1980 | possibly caused by space heater used by workers | |
| Notre Dame de Lourdes, Fall River, Massachusetts | 1982 | blowtorch set fire to roof timbers during restoration | |
| Uppark, Sussex | 1989 | roof re-leading | |
| Windsor Castle | 1992 | incandescent spotlight, permanently installed too close to the altar curtains behind which it was hidden, was accidentally turned on by restorers unfamiliar with the light switches; curtain decomposed over several days | |
| Limoges-Bénédictins station | 1998 | thermal conduction to timbers from hot working of copper roofing during restoration | |
| Central Synagogue, Manhattan | 1998 | blowtorch used to install air conditioning on roof | |
| University of Kentucky Main Building | 2001 | thought to be welding torch used to repair guttering | |
| St. Catherine's Church, Gdańsk | 2006 | started in roof, short circuit of a tinkered cable | |
| Trinity Cathedral, Saint Petersburg | 2006 | originated in exterior scaffolding | |
| Universal Studios Hollywood | 2008 | started when worker used blowtorch to heat asphalt shingles | |
| Heydar Aliyev Center | 2012 | negligent use of welding equipment | |
| Hôtel Lambert, Paris | 2013 | under investigation, started in roof | |
| Basilica of St. Donatian and St. Rogatian, Nantes | 2015 | oxy-fuel torch used to repair lead gutter. | |
| Battersea Arts Centre, London | 2015 | under investigation, started in roof | |
| Mackintosh Building, Glasgow School of Art (2018) | 2018 | 2022 investigation report could not identify cause | |
| Notre-Dame de Paris | 2019 | under investigation; as of 2020, thought to be either a cigarette or a short circuit in the temporary wiring for the reconstruction works | |
| Børsen | 2024 | under investigation | |

Notable construction and renovation fires on watercraft
| Fire | Date | Probable cause | Refs |
|---|---|---|---|
| SS Normandie | 1942 | sparks from a welding torch, during conversion to troopship | |
| MS Bergensfjord | 1980 | fire broke out during reconstruction work | |
| Cutty Sark | 2007 | industrial vacuum cleaner was left on overnight and overheated; 24-hour firewatchers were absent and keeping false inspection logs | |
| USS Miami (SSN-755) | 2012 | arson | |
| USS Bonhomme Richard (LHD-6) | 2020 | accusations of arson were not upheld in court | |

== See also ==
- List of building or structure fires
