= Handelskammeret =

Handelskammeret may refer to:

- Danish Chamber of Commerce
- Danish Chamber of Commerce committee and managing director, 1995, a painting by Thomas Kluge
