= Danish Chamber of Commerce committee and managing director, 1995 =

1995 painting by Thomas Kluge

Danish Chamber of Commerce committee and managing director, 1995 (Danish: Det danske handelskammers komite og administrerende direktør, 1995) is an oil painting by Thomas Kluge. Called Handelskammeret for short, the group portrait was commissioned by the Danish Chamber of Commerce to celebrate the 100th anniversary of the 1895 painting From Copenhagen Stock Exchange by Peder Severin Krøyer. Critics have noted the figures in the painting have oddly proportioned heads and hands relative to their bodies. The subjects, seated in chairs designed by Kaare Klint, were assembled in the chairman's office for the 1995 painting, while the original was set in the Børssal room.

Det danske handelskammer komite og adm. direktør 1995 was one of the artworks rescued from the catastrophic Børsen fire in Copenhagen in April 2024.
