= From Copenhagen Stock Exchange =

1895 painting by Peder Severin Krøyer

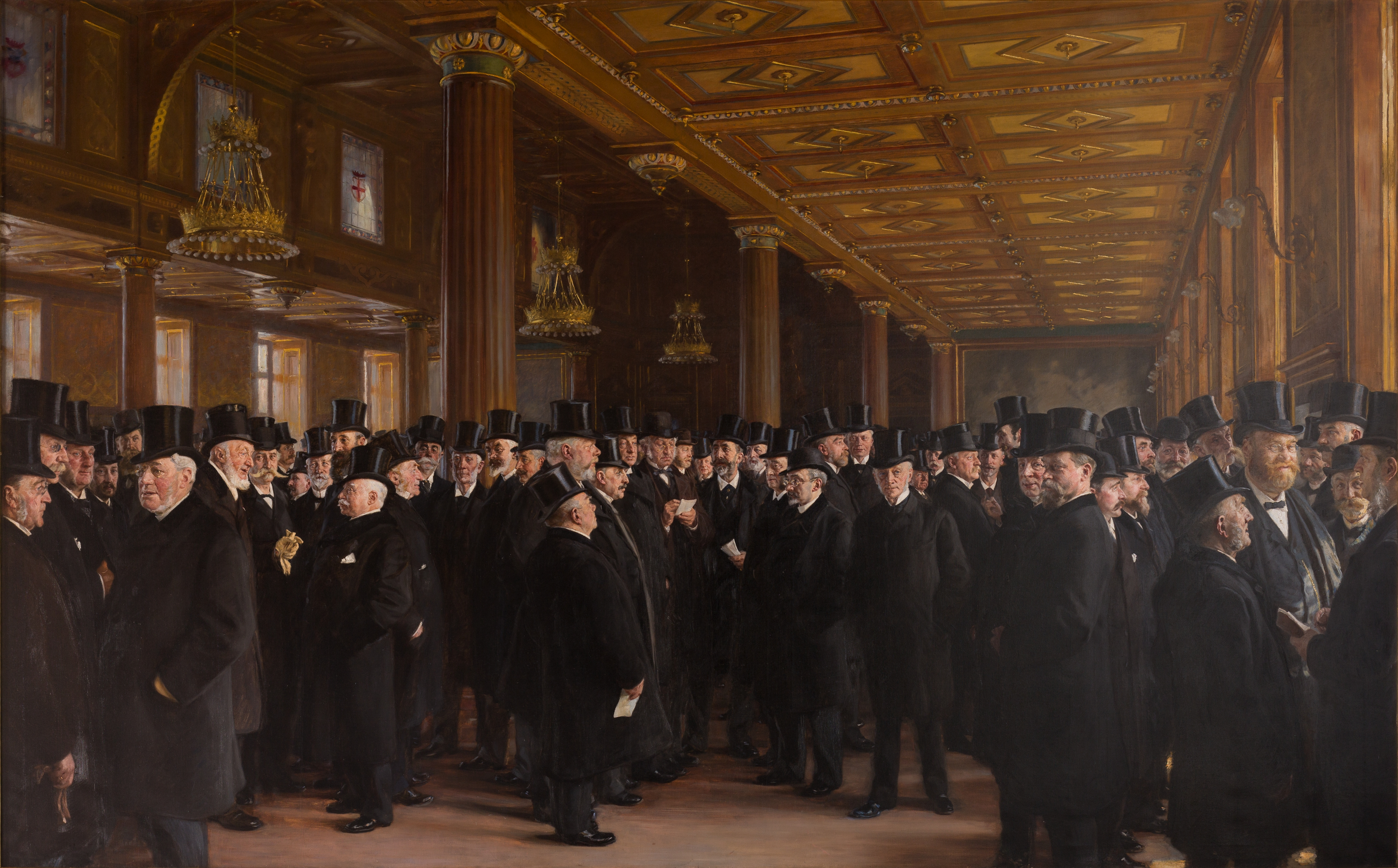
- Artist: Peder Severin Krøyer
- Year: 1895
- Medium: Oil-on-canvas
- Dimensions: 254 cm × 409 cm (100 in × 161 in)
- Location: Copenhagen

From Copenhagen Stock Exchange (Danish: Fra Kjøbenhavns Børs) is a monumental 1895 oil on canvas group portrait painting by Peder Severin Krøyer, featuring 50 representatives of the Danish commercial and financial industries gathered in the Great Hall of Børsen (the Exchange Building) in Copenhagen, Denmark.

== History ==
The idea for the painting was conceived by Gustav Adolph Hagemann in 1881 while he was entertaining C. F. Tietgen, who was posing for Peder Severin Krøyer's portrait of him. Hagemann presented the idea of four monumental group portrait paintings for the newly refurbished Great Hall in Børsen featuring leading representatives of Denmark's trade, industry, agriculture, and shipping sectors.

The Exchange Building was selected as the scene for the first of the paintings. The building had been purchased by Grosserer-Societetet in 1857. Krøyer's price for painting it was DKK 20,000, and the plan was to raise the money through contributions from the people seen in it. The price for one of the more prominent locations in the foreground was initially DKK 800, while the price for a location in the middle was DKK 500, and one in the background was DKK 300. It turned out to be more difficult than expected to raise the money, and things did not start to move until S. V. Isberg from J. B. Suhr & Søn offered to pay DKK 5,000. This lowered the prices to DKK 500, DKK 300, and DKK 100.

The painting was completed in 1895. The original plan of commissioning three more paintings was abandoned. Hagemann did, however, in 1901, commission Men of Industry (Danish: Industriens Mænd), as a private commission for his home in Bredgade.

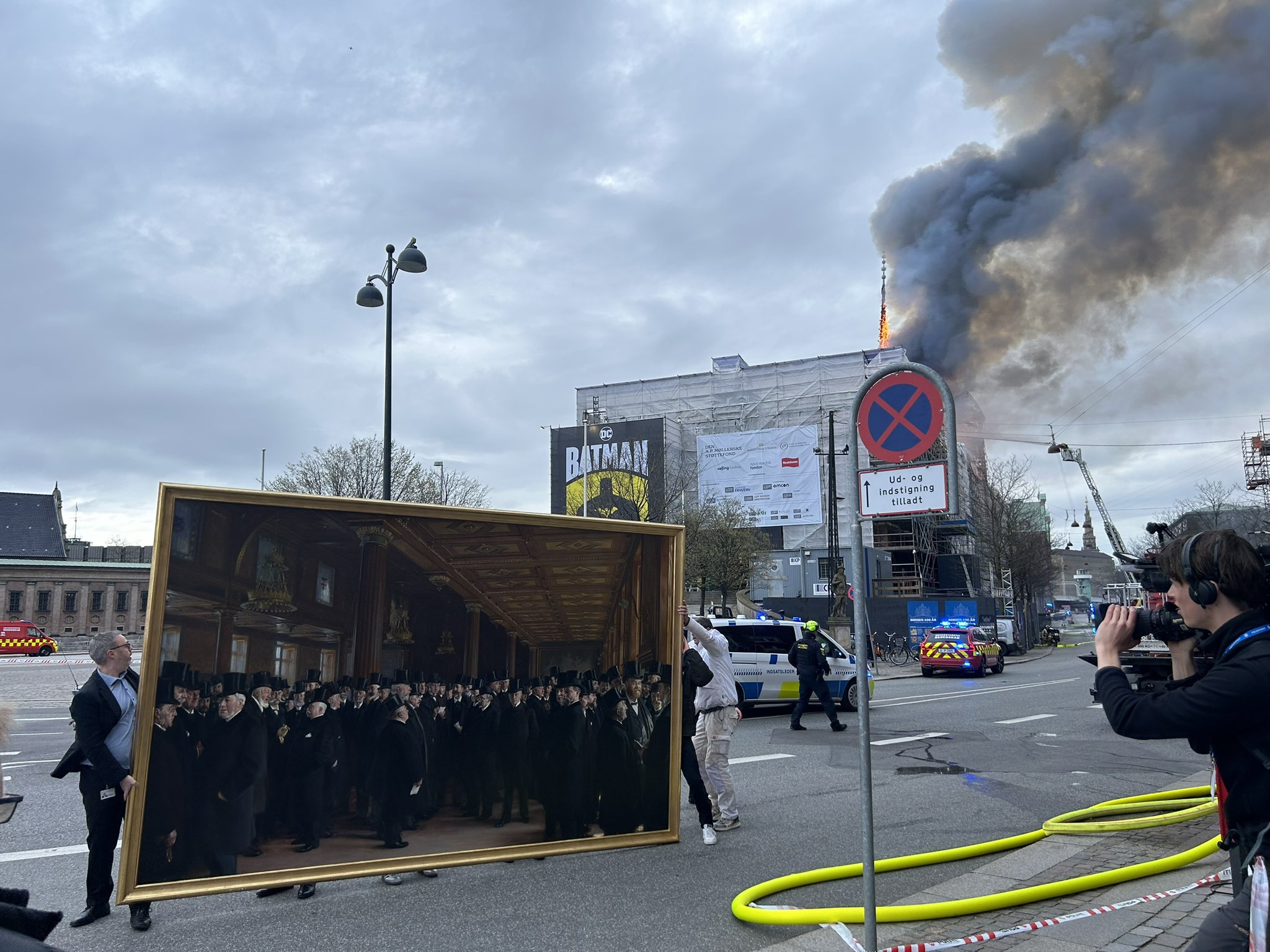
The Painting "Fra Københavns Børs" is rescued during the Børsen fire of 2024.

In April 2024, the painting was rescued from Børsen during a severe fire.

== List of people portrayed in the painting ==
The people portrayed in the painting are:

- Johan Hansen (1838–1913)
- H. P. J. Lyngbye (1834–1920)
- Jacob Holmblad (1839–1904)
- Jacob B. A. Salomon
- Carl Will (1850–1927)
- Georg Petersen (1820–1900)
- Sabinus Seidelin (1819–1904)
- Jacob Heinrich Moresco (1828–1906)
- Sophus Munk Plum (1847–1904)
- Carl Albert Næser (1841–1913)
- Emil Vett (1843–1911)
- Theodor Wessel (1842–1905)
- Bernhard Ruben
- Johan Frederik Carøe (1817–1893)
- Harald Hansen (1835–1902)
- Alfred P. Hansen (1829–1893)
- Wilhelm Petersen (1817–1895?)
- Ferdinand Ekman (1849–1901)
- Benny Levin Fræckel (1825–1893)
- Frants Andreas Lorck (1841–1914)
- Harry Hertz (1828–1895)
- Franz Christopher Smidt (1832–1896)
- Moritz Levy (1824–1892)
- Ludvig Bramsen (1847–1914)
- Claus L. Smidt (1841–1918)
- Peter Nicolai Damm (1839–1918)
- Martin R. Henriques (1825–1912)
- Isak Salomon Salomonsen (1830–1916)
- Isak Glückstadt (1839–1910)
- Axel Prior (1843–1898)
- Christian Holm (1835–1920)
- Carl Frederik Tietgen (1829–1901)
- Toxen Worm (1837–1902)
- Gotfred Halkier (1837–1917)
- Adolf Carl (1848–1908)
- Andreas Collstrop (1847–1933)
- Albert Berendsen (1860–1897)
- Victor Høffding (1836–1910)
- Johannes M. Holm (1835–1912)
- F. Fischer
- F. Schiødte
- Marcus Meyer
- Christoph Cloëtta (1835–1897)
- S. W. Isberg (1820–1895)
- Sigfred Goldschmidt (1831–1906)
- Philip W. Heyman (1837–1893)
- Selgen Sthyr (1837–1922)
- Carl Gammeltoft (1856–1934)
- Valdemar Holm (1835–1908)
- Louis Meyer (1843–1929)

== Related works ==
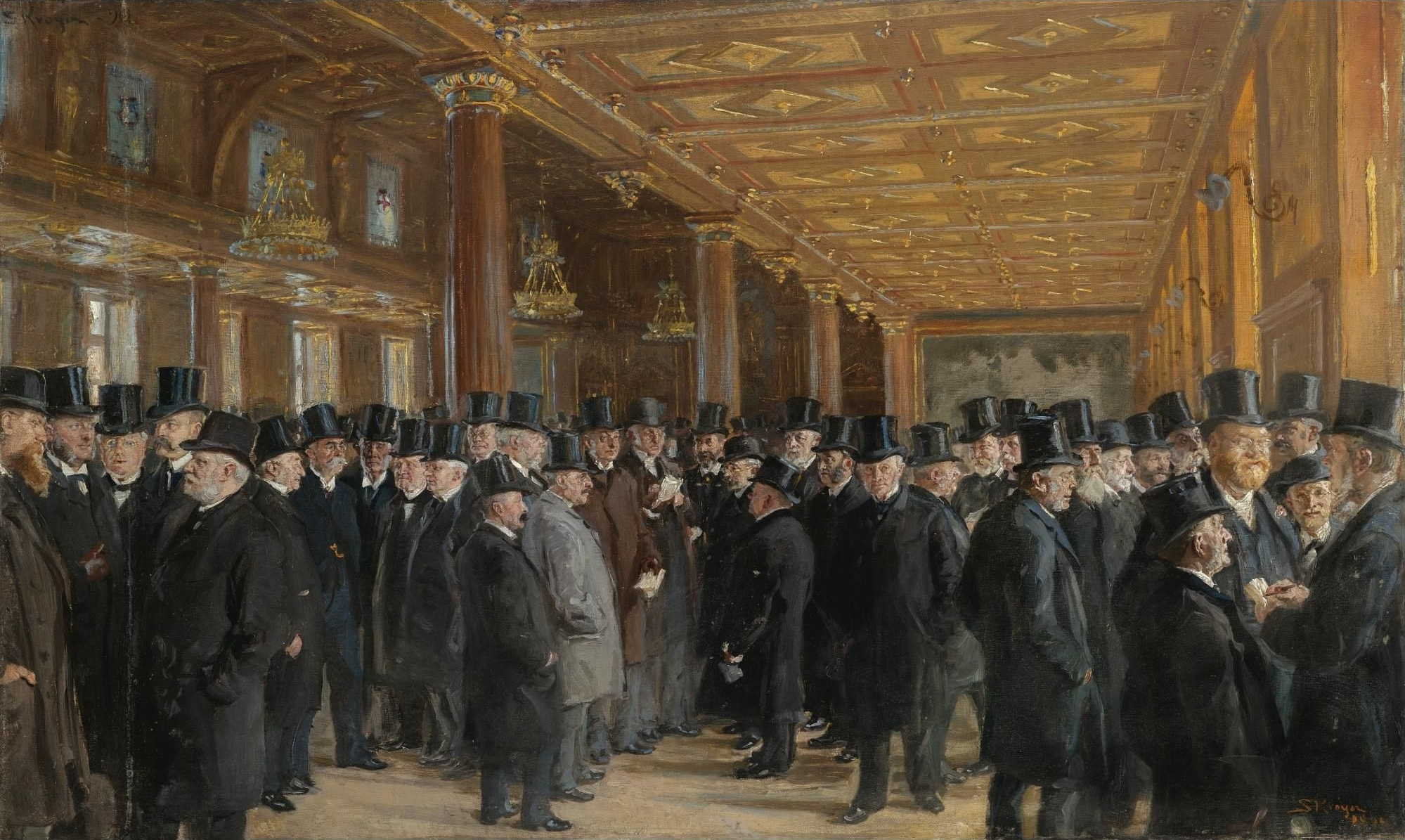
The 1894 study for the painting

Krøyer completed a 49cm x 79 cm oil-on-canvas study for the Stock Exchange painting in 1894. It was previously owned by G. A. Hagemann (1929), Paul Hagemann, and the Codan insurance company but was later sold on a Bruun Rasmussen auction to an anonymous buyer. It has been on display at the following exhibitions:

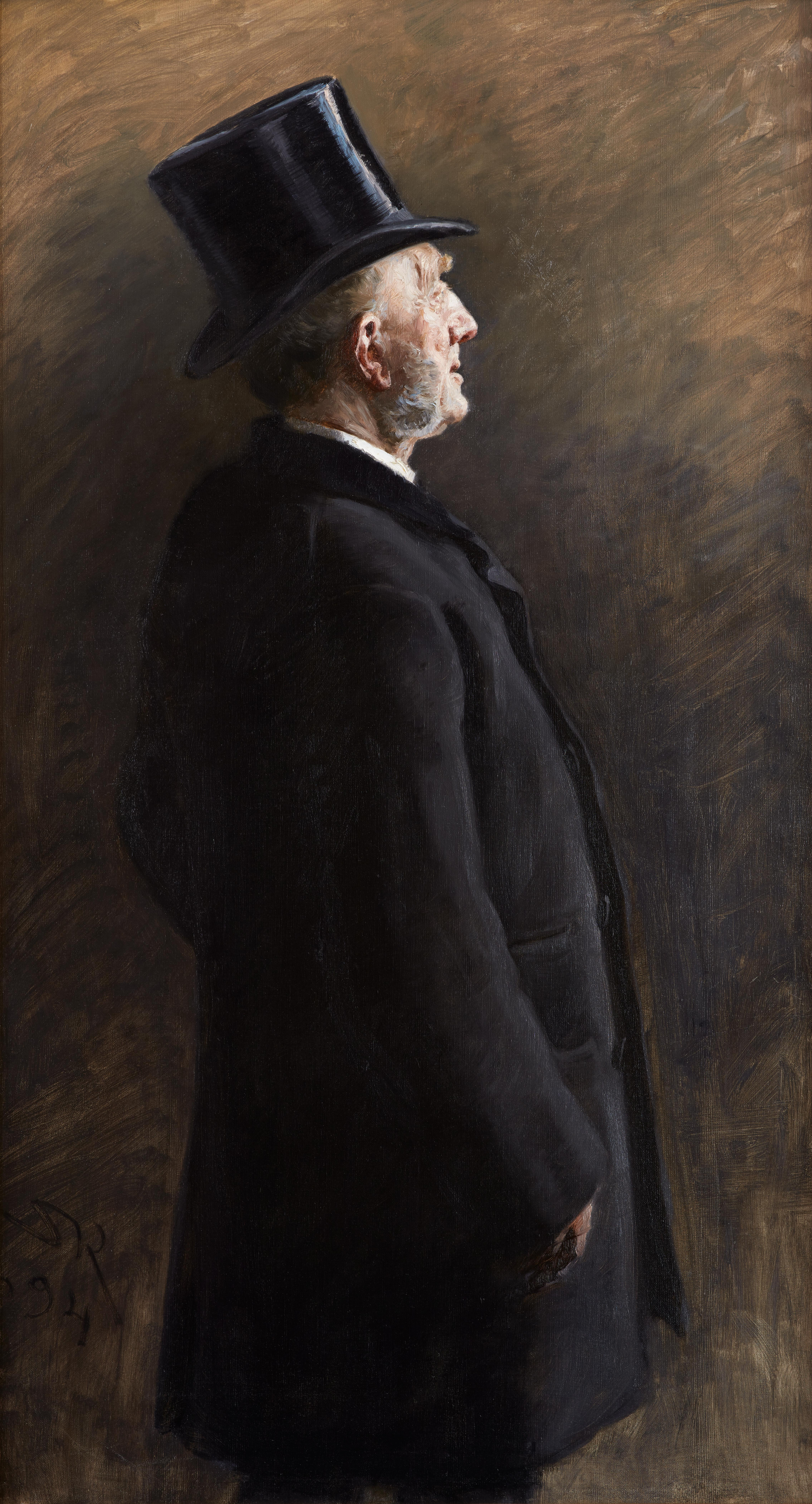
S.V. Isberg 1894

- Venice, "Esposizione Internationale d'Arte Della Citta di Venezia", 1909 no. 634
- Kunstforeningen, "P. S. Krøyer 1851-1909", 1910 no. 239
- Forum Copenhagen, "Det danske Kunststævne", 1929
- Charlottenborg, "Mindeudstilling for P. S. Krøyer 1851-1951", 1951

Krøyer also painted several individual studies for some of the portraits. These include a study for the portrait of S. V. Isberg (The David Collection, 1894) and Peter Nicolaj Damm (Museum of Fine Arts, Ghent, 1894).

Thomas Kluge was in connection with the 100th anniversary of the painting commissioned to paint Det danske handelskammers komite og administrerende direktør, 1995, a group portrait painting of the CEO and 13 committee members of the Danish Chamber of Commerce. Klugge and Krøyer are seen on the cover of two books held by two of the people seen in the painting. The painting, located in the Exchange Building's library, was rescued from the 2024 Børsen fire.

== See also ==
- List of works by Peder Severin Krøyer
- A Meeting in the Royal Danish Academy of Sciences and Letters
