= Harald Hansen (businessman) =

Danish businessman and politician

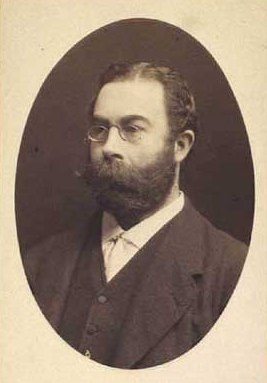
- Born: Harald Andreas Hansen; 24 March 1835; Copenhagen, Denmark
- Died: 10 December 1902 (aged 67); Copenhagen, Denmark
- Occupation: Businessman
- Awards: Knight of the Dannebrog

Harald Andreas Hansen (24 March 1835 – 10 December 1902) was a Danish businessman and politician.

== Early life and education ==
Hansen was born on 24 March 1835 in Copenhagen, the son of Andreas Nicolai Hansen (1798–1873) and Emma Eliza Grut (1803–1865). He completed his schooling in 1851 and earned his cand.phil. degree in 1852. He then received a thorough commercial education in England and Germany before travelling widely in the United States, Australia and the Far East.

== Career ==
Hansen had not yet returned from his travels when he joined his father's firm A. N. Hansen & Co. in 1859. His elder brother Alfred Hansen had already joined the firm in 1856. The two brothers continued the firm after their father's death in 1873, initially with Alfred Hansen in a dominant role but after his death in 1893 with Harald Hansen as the sole owner. The company operated a rice and flour mill as well as a pig farm and slaughterhouse at Bodenhoffs Plads in Christianshavn but was also operating its own fleet of merchant ships. The shipping activities played a still more dominant role in the operations after the company's mills were destroyed by fire in 1885 and 1890. He sold Bodenhoffs Plads to Privatbanken a few years prior to his death and from then on focused entirely on the shipping activities.

== Politics ==
Hansen was a member of the Copenhagen City Council from 1870 to 1875. He was a member of the Landsting from 1879 to 1882 and again from 1886 to 1891. He was mainly interested in issues related to trade and shipping. He was a member of Højre but often deviated from the party line, especially when it came to the expansion of the Port of Copenhagen. He was in favour of an expansion but opposed to the idea of a free port and retired from national politics when the plans for the Free Port of Copenhagen were adopted. He was a member of Grosserer-Societetet's committee from 1893 to 1902.

== Personal life and legacy ==
Hansen married Anna Georgiana Cécile de Dompierre de Jonquiéres (27 February 1847 – 19 February 1941), daughter of civil servant Godefroi Chrétien de Dompierre de Jonquiéres (1818–1883) and Harriot Lindam (1820–1884), on 29 September 1871 in the French Reformed Church in Copenhagen. They had five children. The family lived at Sankt Annæ Plads 17 from 1873.

Hansen became a Knight in the Order of the Dannebrog in 1886. He is one of the businessmen featured in Peder Severin Krøyer's monumental 1888 painting From Copenhagen Stock Exchange in Børsen. He died on 10 December 1902 and is buried in Gentofte Cemetery.

The company was continued by Hansen's sons Andreas Nicolai Hansen (born 1872) and Allan Berry Hansen (born 1875), who had been partners in the company since 1898 and 1900. One of the two daughters, Esther Carstensen (1873–1955), was a women's rights activist and journal editor. She was one of the most active members of the Danish Women's Society (Dansk kvindesamfund), editing its journal from 1908 and becoming its vice-president in 1913.
