= Landfolk =

Danish online marketplace for vacation rentals

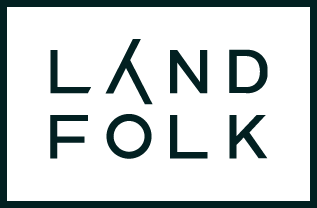
- Website type: Online marketplace
- Available in: English, Danish, German, Norwegian, Swedish, Italian, French, Spanish, Dutch
- Founded: February 1, 2021; 5 years ago in Aarhus, Denmark
- Headquarters: Aarhus, Denmark
- Area served: Denmark, Norway, Sweden, Germany, Italy, France
- Owner: Landfolk A/S
- Founders: Christian Schwarz Lausten, Anders Boelskifte Mogensen, Chris Kjær Sørensen, Jonas Grau, Cathrine K. Reimann, Camilla Swartz Primdahl, Lars Kloster Silkjær
- CEO: Christian Schwarz Lausten
- Website: landfolk.com
- Commercial: Yes
- Current status: Active

Landfolk is a Danish online marketplace for curated vacation rentals It is headquartered in Aarhus and operates across Denmark, Norway, Sweden, Germany, Italy, and France.

== History ==
Landfolk was founded on February 1, 2021, in Aarhus, Denmark, by seven former colleagues from Airbnb, including Cathrine K. Reimann, Camilla Swartz, Christian Schwarz Lausten and Anders Boelskifte Mogensen. They had previously co-founded and sold the meeting-room platform Gaest.com to Airbnb in 2019.

By early 2022 the platform featured over 300 properties in Denmark.

In March 2022 Landfolk received a seed investment from Heartland. The funding was used for international expansion, and Landfolk launched in Norway and Germany later that year.

In mid-2024, Landfolk announced a Series A funding round of €10.3 million, led by Denmark’s Export and Investment Fund (EIFO) with participation from SEED Capital and Heartland.

In October 2024, Landfolk introduced a visual search feature called Daisy, which allows users to search using natural language.

In late 2024, Landfolk acquired Danitalia, a vacation rental agency in Italy.

As of 2025, Landfolk operates in seven countries: Denmark, Norway, Sweden, Germany, Italy, Spain and France.

== Awards ==
In May 2024, Landfolk received the "Best New E-commerce" award from the Danish Chamber of Commerce.

In May 2025, Landfolk received the "Best B2C company with online revenue under DKK 100 million" award from the Danish Chamber of Commerce.
