= Hans Peter Johan Lyngbye =

Danish businessman

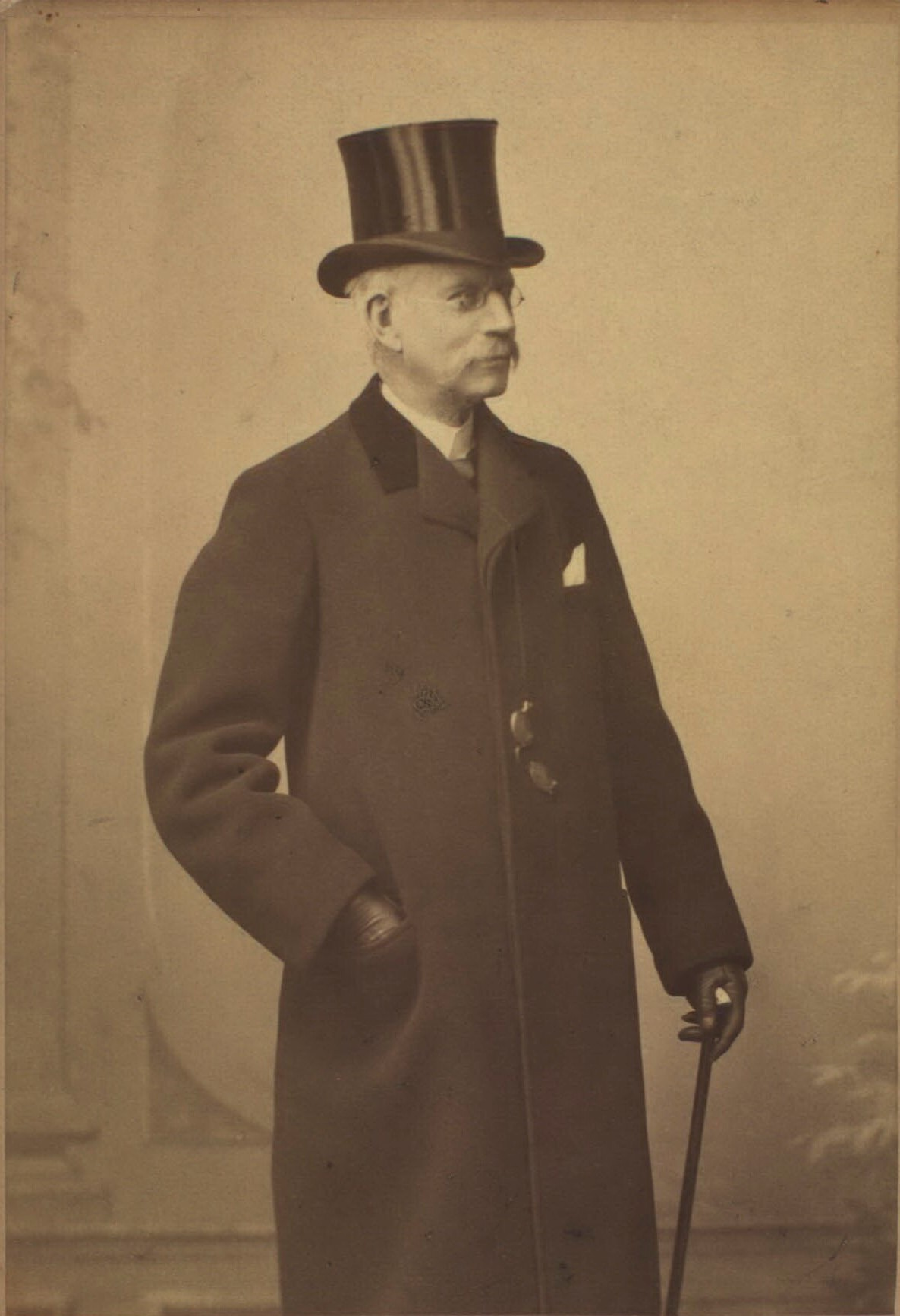
H. P. J. Lyngbye photographed by Hansen & Weller in 1899

Hans Peter Johan Lyngbye (15 July 1834 – 15 April 1920) was a Danish businessman.

== Early life and education ==
Lyngbye was born on 15 July 1834 at Vallø, the son of cantor and Royal Life Guards lieutenant Hans Peter Johan Lyngbye (1803–1834) and Ida Christine Monrath (1807–1893). His father died the same year and his mother was subsequently married to timber merchant Emil Z. Svitzer (1805–1886) in 1849. His original intention was to study law but from 1852 he was instead educated in his foster father's firm, a combined timber business and salvage company. He married a daughter from Switzer's first marriage in 1860.

== Career ==
Lyngbye was granted citizenship as a wholesale merchant (grosserer) in 1863 and at the same time was made a partner in his father-in-law's firm. The salvage division was carved out as an independent limited company (aktieselskab) in 1872. Lyngbye succeeded his father-in-law as managing director of the timber company in 1886 and was also managing director of the salvage company from 1886 to 1896.

== Other activities ==
Lyngbye served as specialist judge at the Maritime and Commercial Court from 1872 to 1907. He was a member of Grosserer-Societetet's committee from 1883 to 1912. He belonged to C. F. Tietgen's social circle and was a member of Privatbanken's bank council from 1887. From 1895, he was also active (as kommitteret) in Det Kgl. Octroj. Søe-Assurance Compagni (from 1913 as chairman of the board). He was a board member and cashier of the Georg Stage Foundation from 1884.

== Personal life ==
Lyngbye married Emilia Andrea Cathinka Henriette Wilhelmine Svitzer (24 November 1837 – 7 May 1884) on 21 September 1860 in the Church of Our Lady in Copenhagen. She was the daughter of Emil Z. Switzer by his first wife Ida Sophie Suzette von Holstein (1813–1842).

Lyngbye was fond of music and active in the management of Musikforeningen from 1891 to 1915. He composed the melody for H. P. Holst's song Ved vintertid, når skoven står.

Lyngbye is one of the 50 businessmen seen in Peder Severin Krøyer's monumental 1895 group portrait painting From Copenhagen Stock Exchange. He died on 15 April 1920 and is buried at Copenhagen's Assistens Cemetery.

== Awards ==
- Etatsråd, 1892
- Konferensråd, 1908
- Knight in the Order of the Dannebrog, 1879
- Cross of Honour, 1899
- 2nd-class Commander of the Order of the Dannebrog, 1904
