= Sigfred Goldschmidt =

Jewish Danish businessman

Sigfred Goldschmidt (8 July 1831 – 13 October 1906) was a Jewish Danish businessman.

== Early life and education ==
Goldschmidt was born on 8 July 1831 in Copenhagen, the son of silk and textile merchant Bendix Meyer Goldschmidt (1791–1874) and Rose Trier (1802–1890). He was educated in L. S. Trier's banking business.

== Career ==
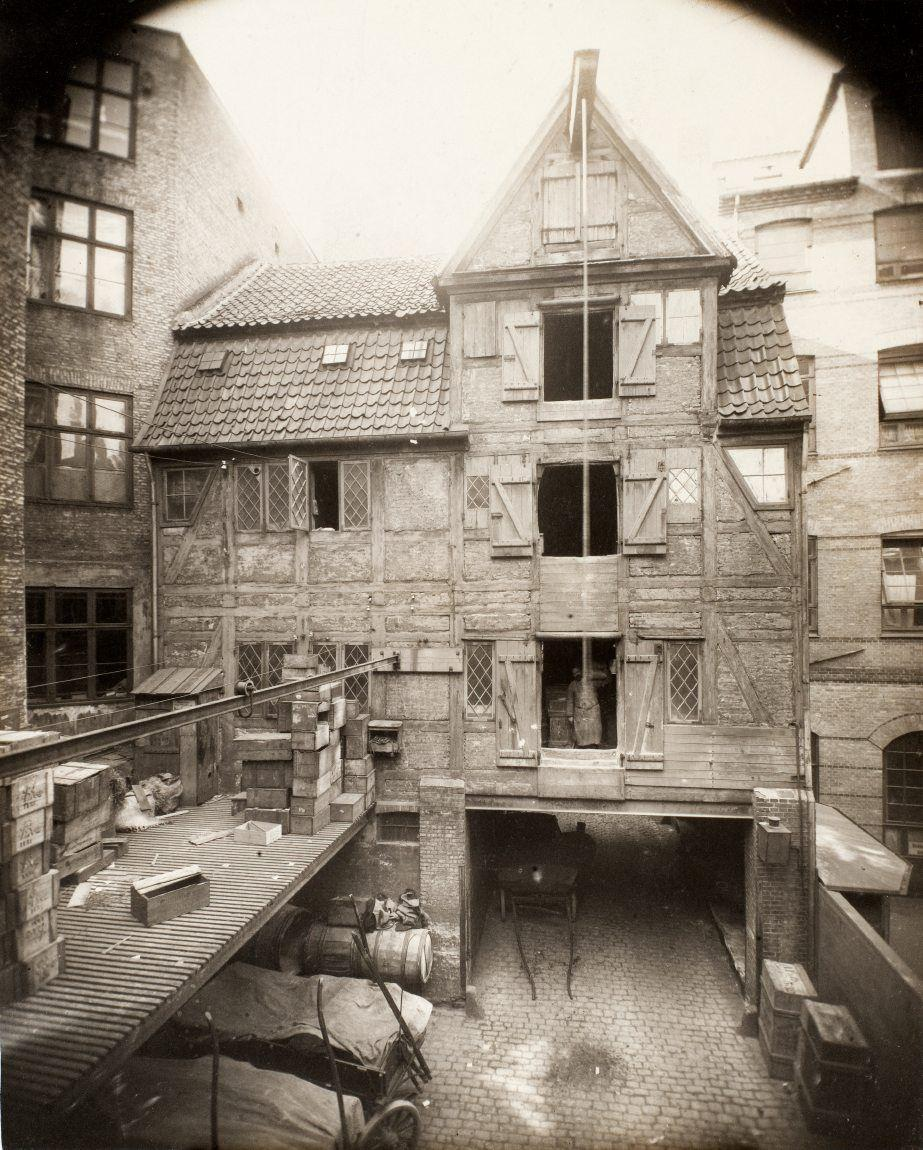
Trier & Goldschmidt's warehouse in the courtyard at Amagertoorv 8 in Copenhagen

From 1850, Goldschmidt was employed in his maternal uncle Adolph Trier's trading firm (founded 1841). Based out of the cellar at Amagertorv 8, it was still mostly a retail shop although Trier had recently made a move into the wholesale market.

Goldschmidt was made a partner in the firm on 1 January 1857 and it was from this on exclusively a wholesale business. Its name was changed to Adolph Trier & Goldschmidt until 1867. Trier & Goldschmidt was one of the first Danish trading houses to avoid the Hamburg-based intermediaries when trading on other European and overseas markets. It grew to become one of the largest Danish wholesalers of colonial goods such as sugar, rice, and spices. Goldschmidt headed the firm until the summer of 1904.

== Other activities ==
Goldschmidt was a member of Grosserer-Societetet's committee from 1880 to 1905. He was a specialist judge at the Maritime and Commercial High Court from 1874 to 1902. He was a member of the Board of Deputies of Danish Jews from 1868 to 1882 and was also active on the boards of Copenhagen's two Jewish schools.

== Personal life ==
Goldschmidt married Galathea Meyer (12 June 1835 – 13 April 1874), a daughter of merchant Saul Meyer (1790–1862) and Frederikke Texiére (1809–1861), on 6 December 1857 in Copenhagen. They had three children: Frederikke Sofie Goldschmidt (1862–1863), Georg Goldschmidt (1866–1904) and Victor Albert Goldschmidt (1870–1933).

Goldschmidt is one of the businessmen seen in Peder Severin Krøyer's monumental 1888 painting From Copenhagen Stock Exchange. He was created a Knight in the Order of the Dannebrog in 1899. He died on 13 October 1906 and is buried in the Jewish Northern Cemetery.

== See also ==
- Adolph Trier & Goldschmidt
