= Søe-Assurance Compagniet =

Marine insurance company

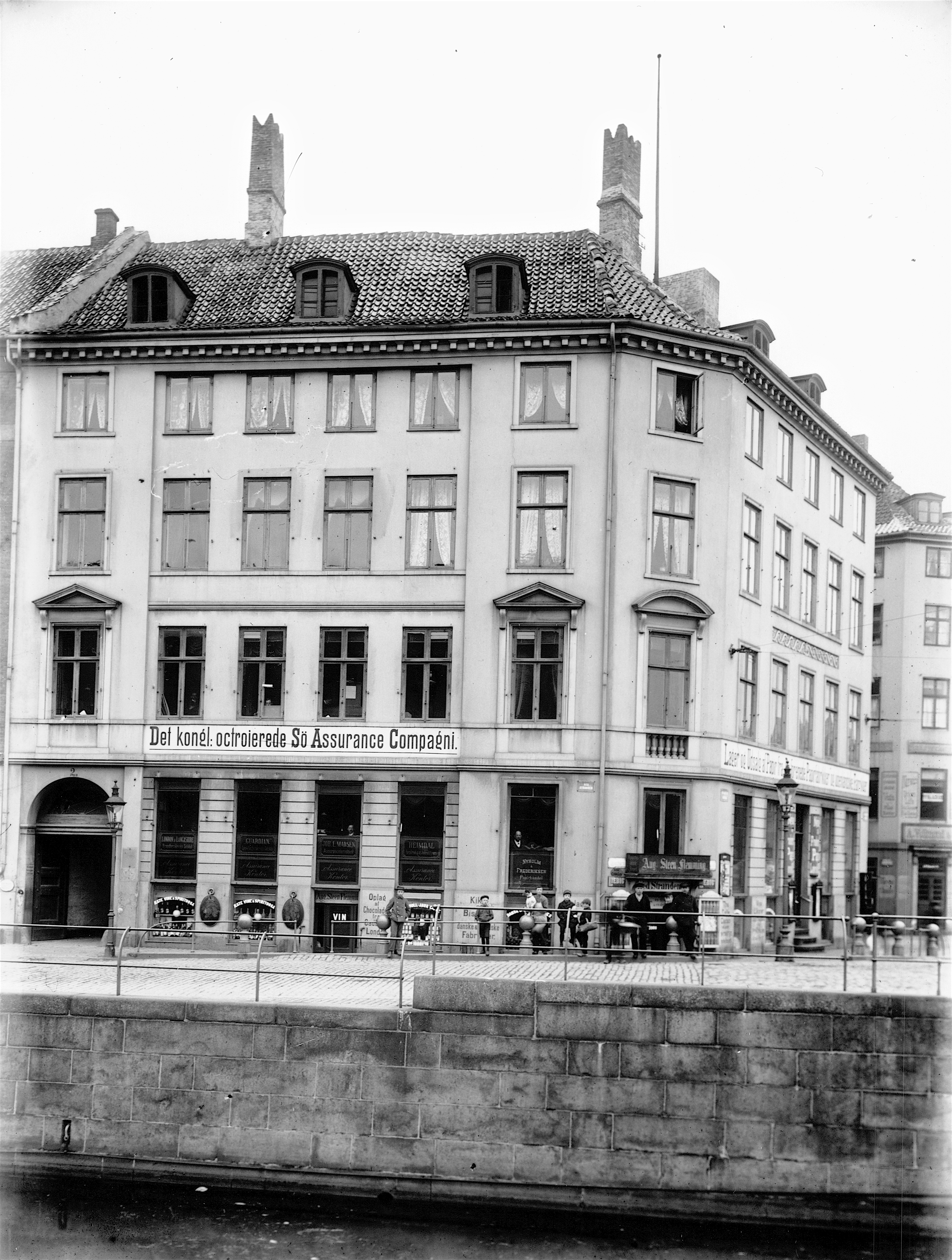
Ved Stranden 2 photographed by Peter Elfelt in 190.5.

Det Kongelige octroierede Søe-Assurance Compagni, often referred to as Søe-Assurance Compagniet, was founded in 1728 as the first marine insurance company in Denmark. It held a monopoly on marine insurance in Denmark until 1786.

== History ==
Det Kongelige octroierede Søe-Assurance Compagni was founded in the Børsen building in Copenhagen in 1728.

The company's monopoly on marine insurance was challenged by Niels Ryberg and other major merchants and ship-owners towards the middle of the century. Its monopoly was finally lifted in 1783, leading to the formal establishment of De private Assurandeurer in 1786. The company existed until 1930.

== Management ==
=== Directors, 1851–1926 ===
- 1851—1866: Matthias Wilhelm Sass (wholesaler)
- 1851—1868: Frederik August Paludan (naval officerm commodore)
- 1851—21862: Christian Wilhelm Haagen (bank manager)
- 1851—1851: Emil Zeuthen Svitzer (wholesaler)
- 1851—1875: Pierre Jean Agier (wholesaler)
- 1862—1873: Lars Christian Larsen (lawyer)
- 1868-1880: F. Paludan (naval officer, captain)
- 1874—1878: Helland (consul)
- 1876-1883: B. W. Sass (wholesaler)
- 1878—1893: H. J. Rønne (wholesaler)
- 1881—1892: Carl Frederik Gottlob Stage (shipowner)
- 1883–1912; Gustav James Hansen (wholesaler)
- 1893—1895: Johan Christian Kraf (naval officer, commodore)
- 1893—1913: William Theodor Malling (wholesaler)
- 1895—1920: Hans Peter Johan Lyngbye (wholesaler)
- 1913—1922: Carl Julius Peter Ryberg (business executive)
- 1914—1917: Aage Hjalmar Ostenfeld (business executive)
- 1918—1922: de Nully Brown (business executive)
- 1920–1923; Jens Daugaard-Jensen.
- 1922—1923: Andreas Christian Hamann Erlands en (shipowner)
- 1923—: Johs. Stein (lawyer)
- 1923—: Direktør Vilhelm A. Bang
- 1924—: E. I. Baastrup (business executive)
- 1924—: William Malling (wholesaler)

== Rcternal links ==
- Source
- Source
