= Freja Brandhøj =

Danish politician (born 1987)

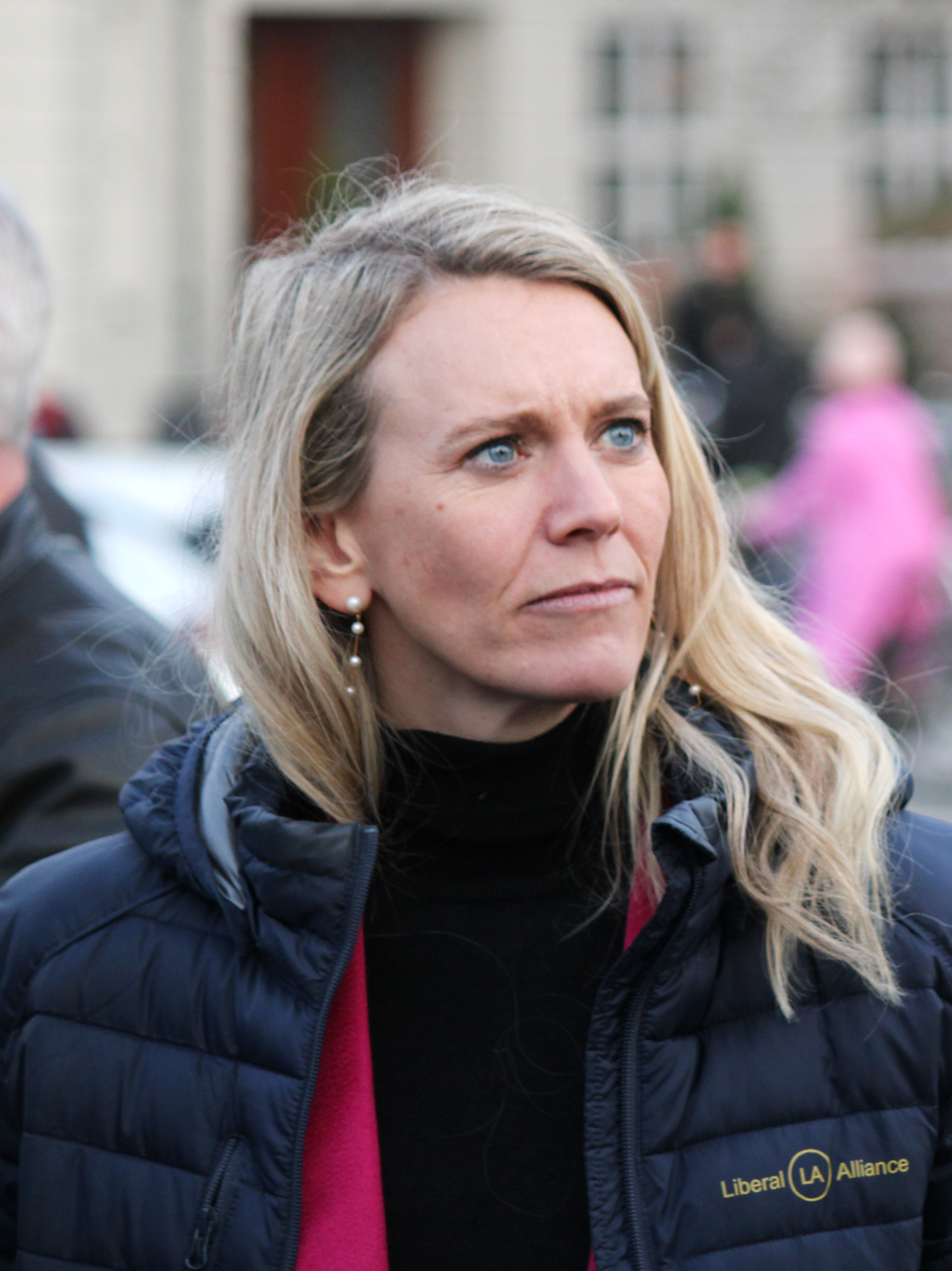
- Brandhøj in 2026

Member of the Folketing
- Incumbent
- Assumed office 24 March 2026
- Constituency: Greater Copenhagen

Personal details
- Born: 13 October 1987 (age 38)
- Party: Liberal Alliance (since 2025)

Freja Brandhøj (born 13 October 1987) is a Danish politician serving as a member of the Folketing since 2026. She has served as head of entrepreneurship policy at the Danish Chamber of Commerce since 2024.

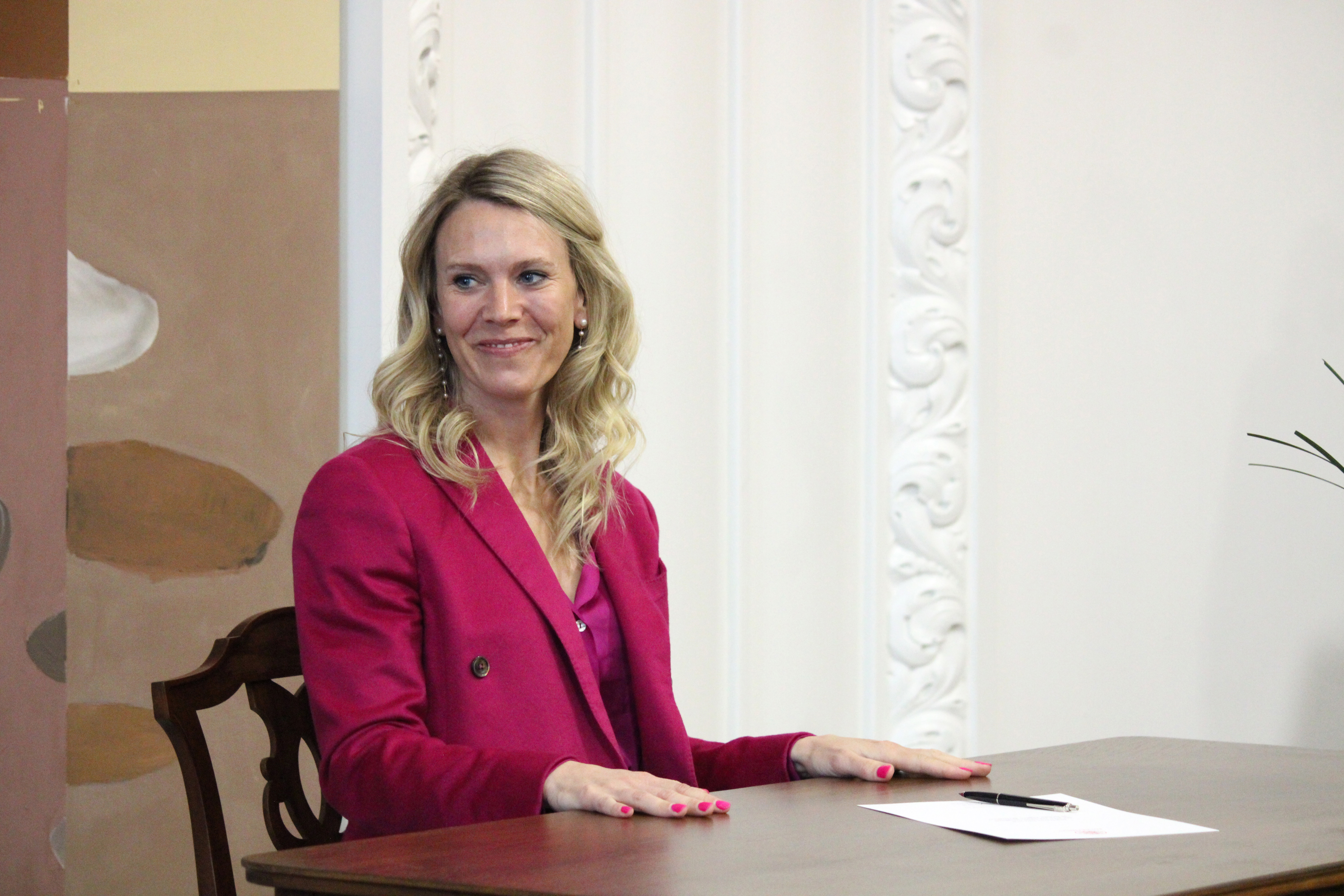
Brandhøj signing a pledge to uphold the Danish Constitution at Christiansborg, 14 April 2026
