= Esther Carstensen =

Danish women's rights activist and journal editor

Ester Henriette Carstensen
- Carstensen in 1913
- Born: Ester Henriette Hansen; 10 August 1873; Skodsborg, Denmark
- Died: 12 December 1955 (aged 82); Copenhagen, Denmark
- Father: Harald Andreas Hansen

Ester Henriette Carstensen née Hansen (10 August 1873–12 December 1955) was a Danish women's rights activist and journal editor. She was one of the most active members of the Danish Women's Society (Dansk kvindesamfund), editing its journal from 1908 and becoming its vice-president in 1913. She later headed the Copenhagen chapter of the Women's Society.

== Early life and education ==
Born on 10 August 1873 in Skodsborg, Esther Henriette Hansen was the daughter of the merchant Harald Andreas Hansen (1835–1902) and Anna Georgiana Cécile de Jonquières (1847–1941). Raised in a well-to-do aristocratic home in Copenhagen, she matriculated from N. Zahle's School in 1893. In 1897, she took the examination for the first part of the civil engineering programme of study at the Polytechnical Institute. She did not complete her studies as in 1898 she married Ivan Carstensen (1871–1949), an officer in the Life Guards.

== Career ==
From an early age, like her cousin Estrid Hein, Carstensen took a special interest in the status of women in the community. In 1906, she was a co-founder of Foreningen til Hjælp for enligtstillede (Association for Supporting Single Mothers) but went on to devote most of her time to the Danish Women's Society. In 1907, she replaced Astrid Stampe Feddersen as head of the society's voting rights committee but failed to persuade all the other women's organizations interested in voting rights to join the Women's Society.

From then on, she became a leading member of the organization, serving as vice-president from 1913 to 1918. In addition, from 1908 to 1913, she edited the Society's journal Kvinden & Samfundet, working with Thora Daugaard as editing secretary. Not only did she display fine editing skills, she became an effective contributor to the journal herself.

As local branches of the Women's Society were created, Carstensen headed the Copenhagen chapter from 1913 to 1918 and later from 1934 to 1944, when she was elected honorary president for life. On moving to Viborg with her husband, she headed the Society's Viborg chapter from 1928 to 1932.

While Carstensen was involved in improving all aspects of women's rights, she was particularly concerned with the insecurity experienced by married women, given their lack of economic independence. An effect speaker and discussion leader, despite her aristocratic manner she was always ready to take up any aspect of work, including going out on the streets to distribute leaflets or sell the Society's marguerites.

Esther Carstensen died on 12 December 1955 in Copenhagen.
