= Børsen =

Historic building in Copenhagen, Denmark

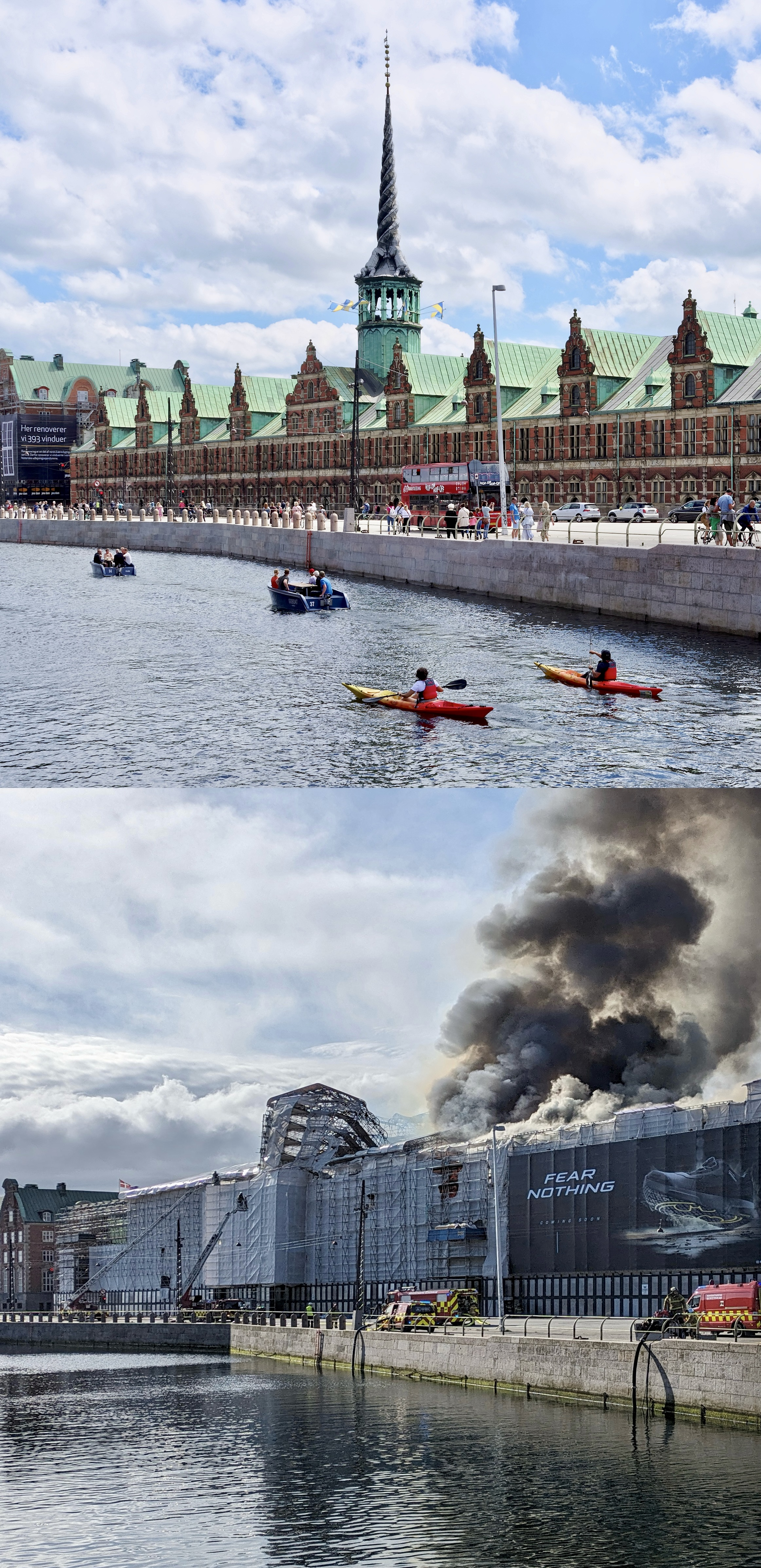
- Børsen on 18 June 2022 (top), and Børsen on 16 April 2024 (bottom), view from Slotsholmskanalen side
- Interactive map of the Børsen area

General information
- Status: Damaged by fire
- Architectural style: Dutch renaissance
- Location: Copenhagen, Denmark
- Coordinates: 55°40′32″N 12°35′2″E
- Construction started: 1619
- Completed: 1640
- Renovated: 1745; 1855
- Client: Christian IV
- Owner: Danish Chamber of Commerce

Design and construction
- Architects: Lorenz van Steenwinckel and Hans van Steenwinckel the Younger

Renovating team
- Architects: Nicolai Eigtved (1745); Harald Conrad Stilling (1855)

Børsen (Danish for "the bourse" or "the stock exchange") is a 17th-century commodity bourse and later stock exchange in the centre of Copenhagen, Denmark. The historic building is situated next to Christiansborg Palace, the seat of the Danish Parliament, on the island of Slotsholmen.

Built under the reign of Christian IV in 1619–1640, the building is considered a leading example of the Dutch Renaissance style in Denmark. It is a protected building for conservation purposes. A popular tourist attraction, Børsen is most noted for its distinctive spire, shaped as the tails of four dragons twined together, reaching a height of 56 m (184 ft). On 16 April 2024, the building was destroyed by fire, which toppled the spire.

== History ==
Børsen was planned by Christian IV as part of his plan to strengthen Copenhagen's role as a centre for trade and commerce in Northern Europe. A site on the north side of the embankment which connected Copenhagen to the new market town Christianshavn, which was planned on reclaimed land off the coast of Amager. The king charged Lorenz van Steenwinckel with the design of the new building, but Steenwinckel died shortly thereafter. The assignment was then passed on to his brother, Hans van Steenwinckel.

=== 17th and 18th centuries ===
The site first had to be prepared since the embankment had not yet stabilized. Construction of the building began in 1620 and was largely completed in 1624 with the exception of the spire (installed in 1625) and details of the east gable (completed in 1640). The building contained 40 trading offices at the ground floor and one large room at the upper floor. The building was in use as a marketplace during the late 1620s.

In 1647, Christian IV sold the building to the merchant Jacob Madsen for 50,000 Danish rigsdaler. Frederick III later reacquired the building from Madsen's widow, who could no longer afford to maintain the building.

The building was restored by Nicolai Eigtved in 1745.

=== 19th and 20th centuries ===
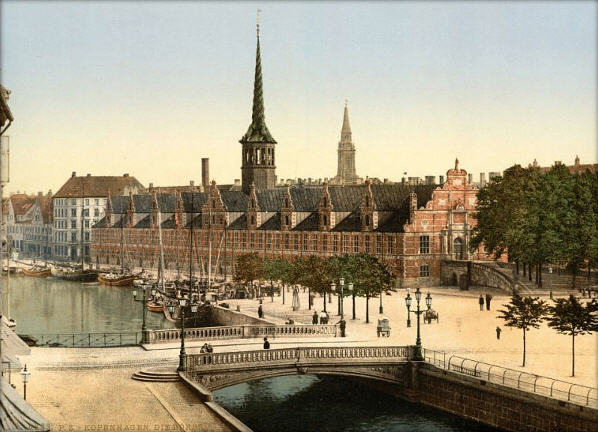
Børsen seen with Højbro bridge in the foreground, 19th century

The interior of the building was renovated in 1855, and the interior was renovated by architect Harald Conrad Stilling. In 1857, Frederick VII sold the building to Grosserer-Societetet for 70,000 rigsdaler.

On 11 February 1918, due to rising inequality, unemployed anarchists stormed Børsen, attacking stockbrokers.

The building housed the Danish stock market until 1974.

=== 21st century ===
As of 2024, the building served as the headquarters of the Danish Chamber of Commerce (Dansk Erhverv).

==== 2024 fire ====
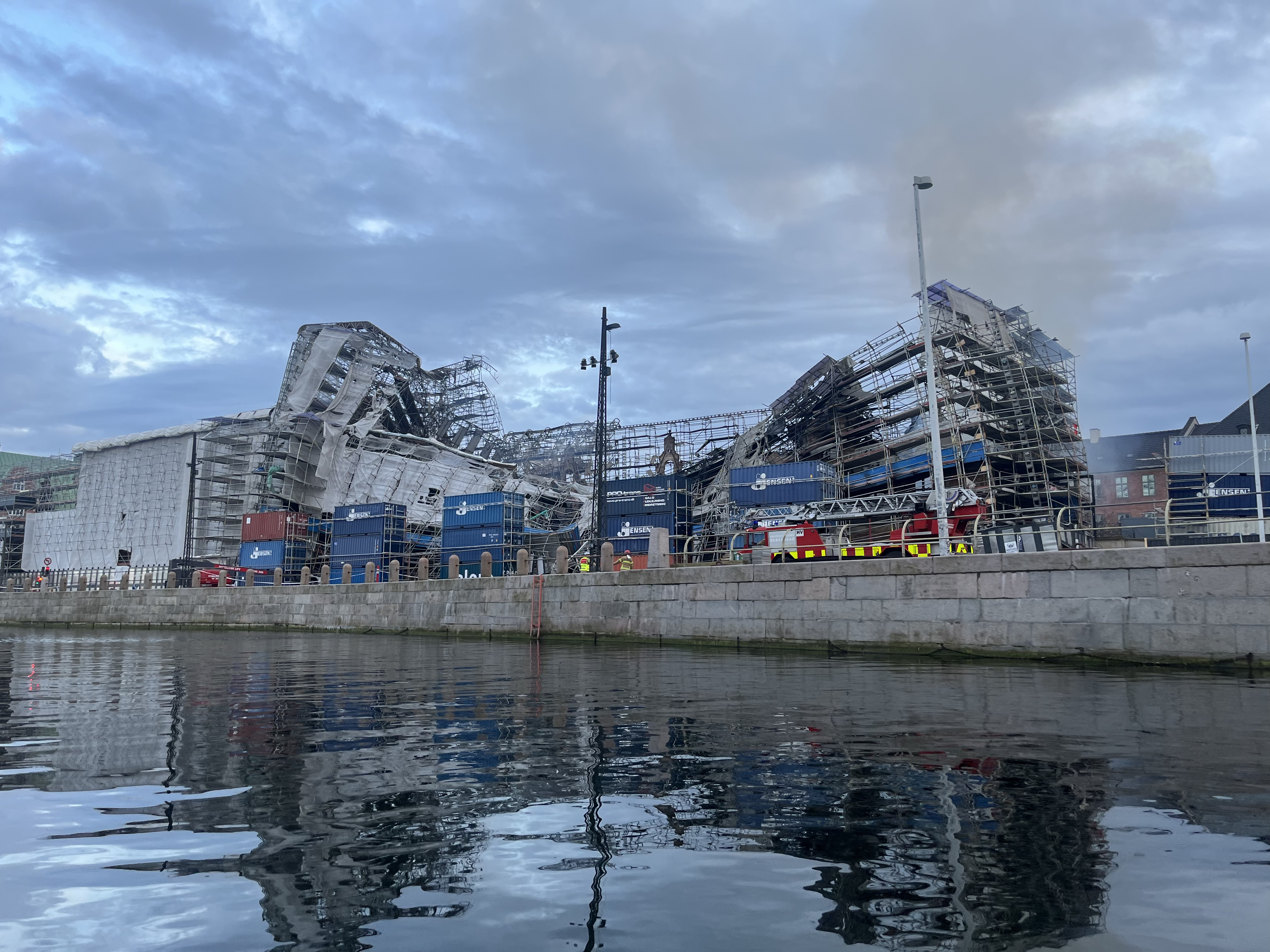
The severely damaged building and scaffolding on 18 April, two days after the 2024 fire

On 16 April 2024, a fire during renovation work in the main building's copper roof destroyed about half of the building and resulted in the collapse of its iconic Dragespir ("Dragon Spire"). There were no casualties. Børsen survived several earlier fires that occurred nearby: Christiansborg Palace burned down several times, the neighbouring building Privatbanken has been on fire, and the same happened to Proviantgården in Slotsholmsgade in 1992. The scaffolding around the building also caught fire, making it harder for firefighters to reach the flames, while the copper roof contained the heat. Military personnel were also on site to support firefighting efforts. Additional machinery was deployed to help remove the roof, as it was preventing water from reaching the fire. The facades were in danger of collapsing while the fire burned, as the building is mostly made of wood. A part of the north facade and a part of the west gable eventually collapsed on 18 April.

"Several hundred" historic artworks from the building's substantial collection, as well as historic furniture, were rescued from the burning building by staff, emergency workers, and passers-by. Among them were the paintings From Copenhagen Stock Exchange by Skagen Painter Peder Severin Krøyer and Handelskammeret by Thomas Kluge. However, a two-tonne bust of King Christian IV of Denmark was lost. The nearby National Museum immediately sent 25 employees to help retrieve the art.

Brian Mikkelsen, CEO of the Danish Chamber of Commerce, which owns the building, said that it would be rebuilt "no matter what". Denmark's Deputy Prime Minister, Troels Lund Poulsen, called the fire "our own Notre Dame moment". The fire occurred five years and one day after the Notre-Dame fire in Paris, another renovation fire which also destroyed the building's roof and spire. King Frederik X released a statement, saying that the fire was "a sad sight [...] For 400 years, Christian IV's edifice, Børsen, has been a distinctive landmark of Copenhagen."

On 12 November 2024, police ruled out criminal acts as a cause of the fire, adding that it could not determine the exact cause.

=== Reconstruction ===
Reconstruction works on the building began on 26 September 2024, with King Frederik X laying a foundation stone. Builders plan to use "the same materials that were available in the 17th century. More than 800,000 handmade red bricks have been ordered from Germany and Poland, almost 900 pine trees are being brought from Denmark and Sweden, and recycled copper comes from Finland." As of summer 2025, construction workers were removing the copper cladding on the roof so that the wooden struts below could be replaced. It may take up to 70 years for the replacement copper roof to match the patination of the original. The current projected completion date is 2029.

== Architecture ==
Børsen was constructed by the architects Lorenz van Steenwinckel and Hans van Steenwinckel the Younger. It is approximately 128 m (420 ft) long and 21 m (69 ft) wide.

The building was known for its twisted "Dragon Spire," which was from 1625 and was designed as four intertwining dragon tails. The spire had three crowns atop, symbolizing the kingdoms of Denmark, Norway, and Sweden. In 1775, a new spire was erected somewhat similar to the old one because there was a risk of it collapsing. The dragons that made up the spire, designed by the fireworks master of Christian IV, were supposed to protect the building from enemies and fire.

There have been some minor changes over time.

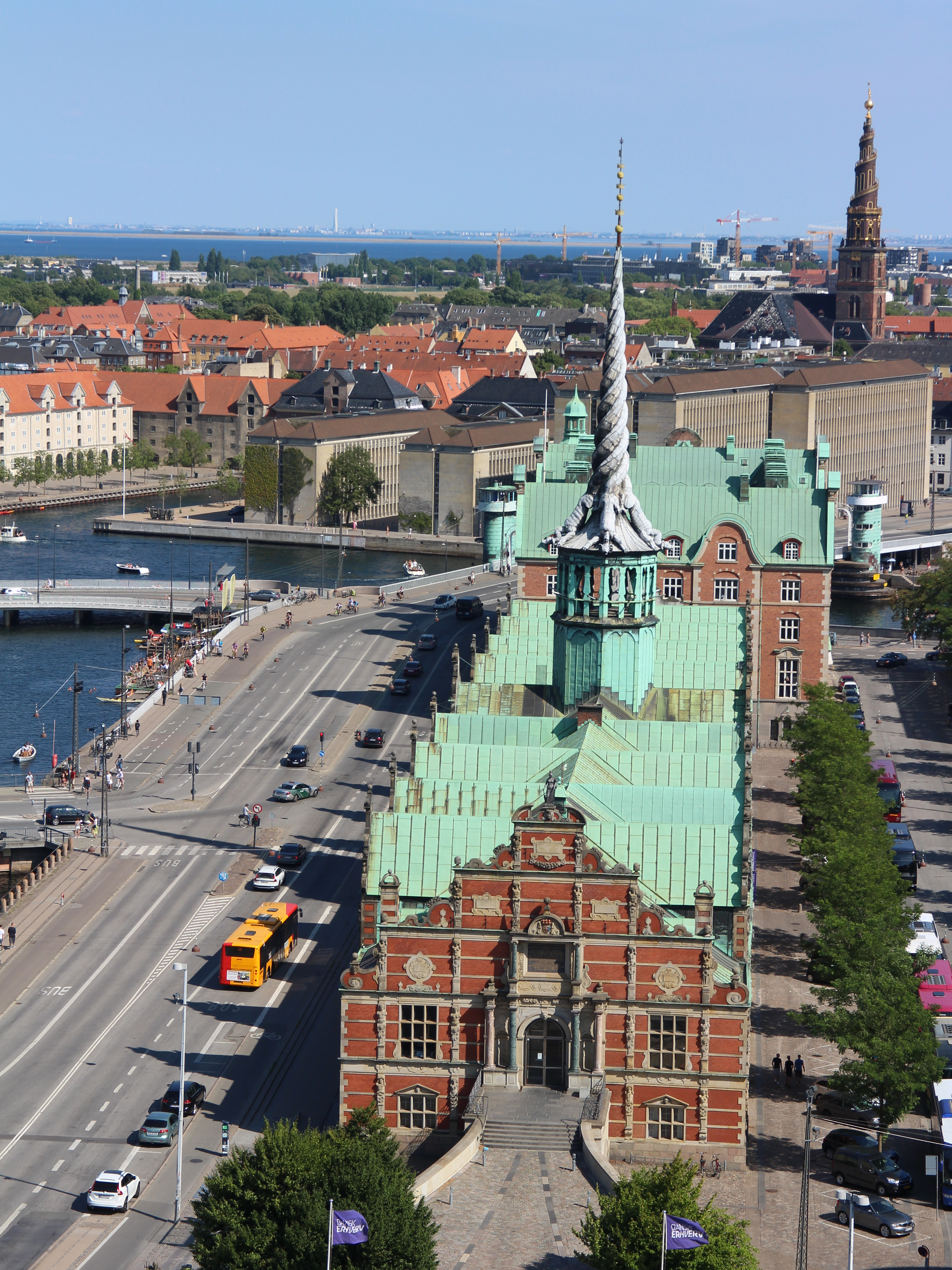
Børsen seen from the tower of Christiansborg

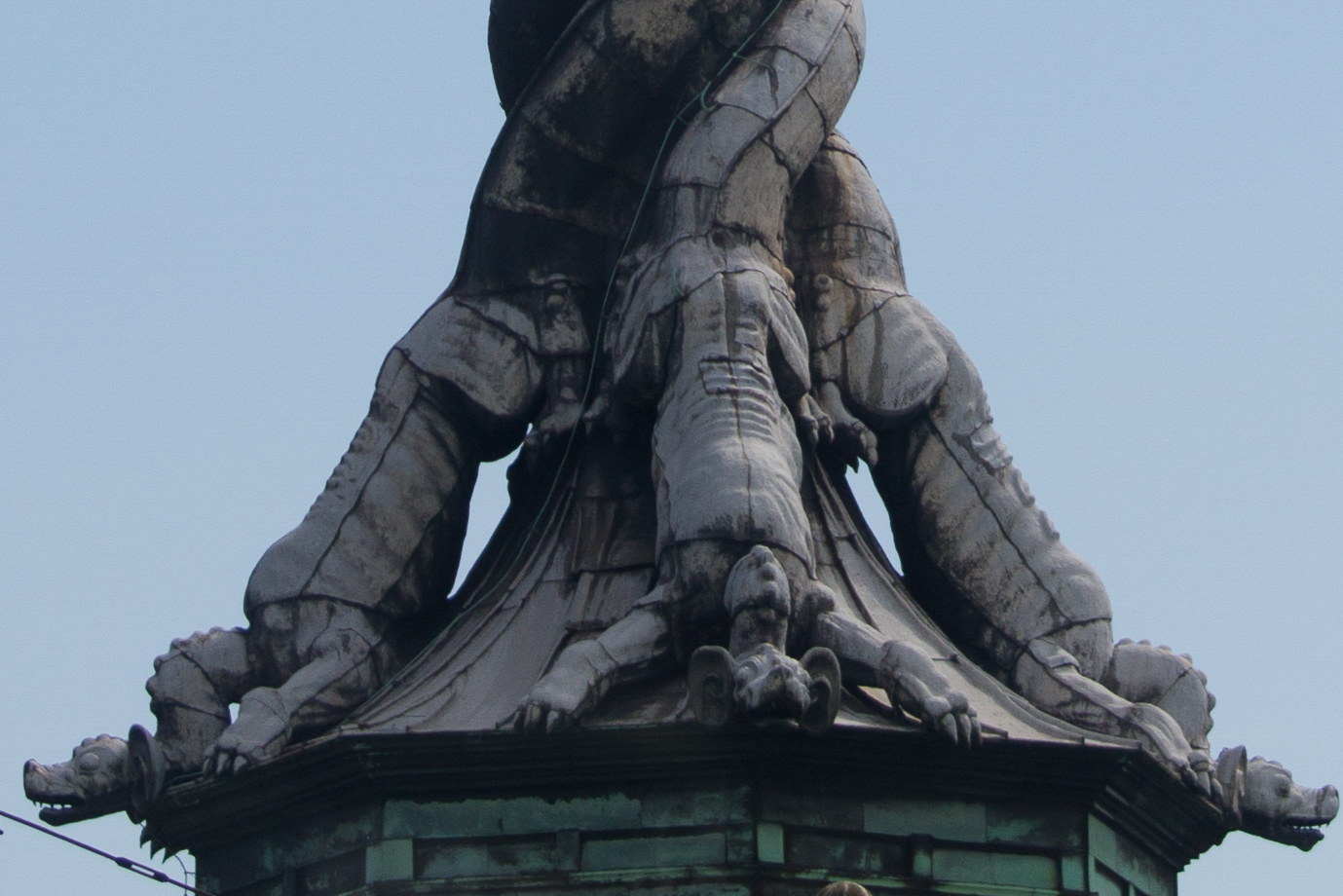
Base of the spire

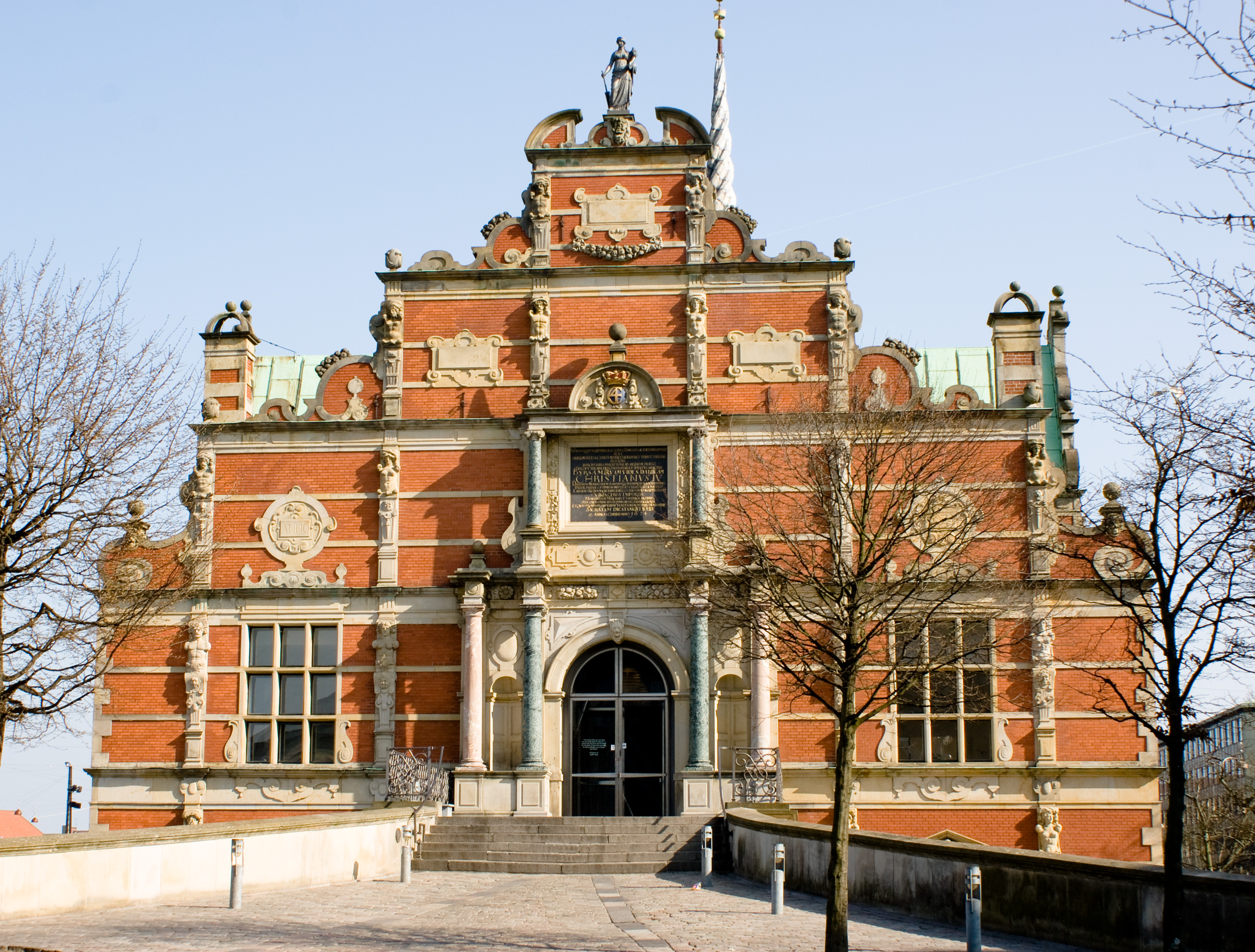
Western facade of Børsen

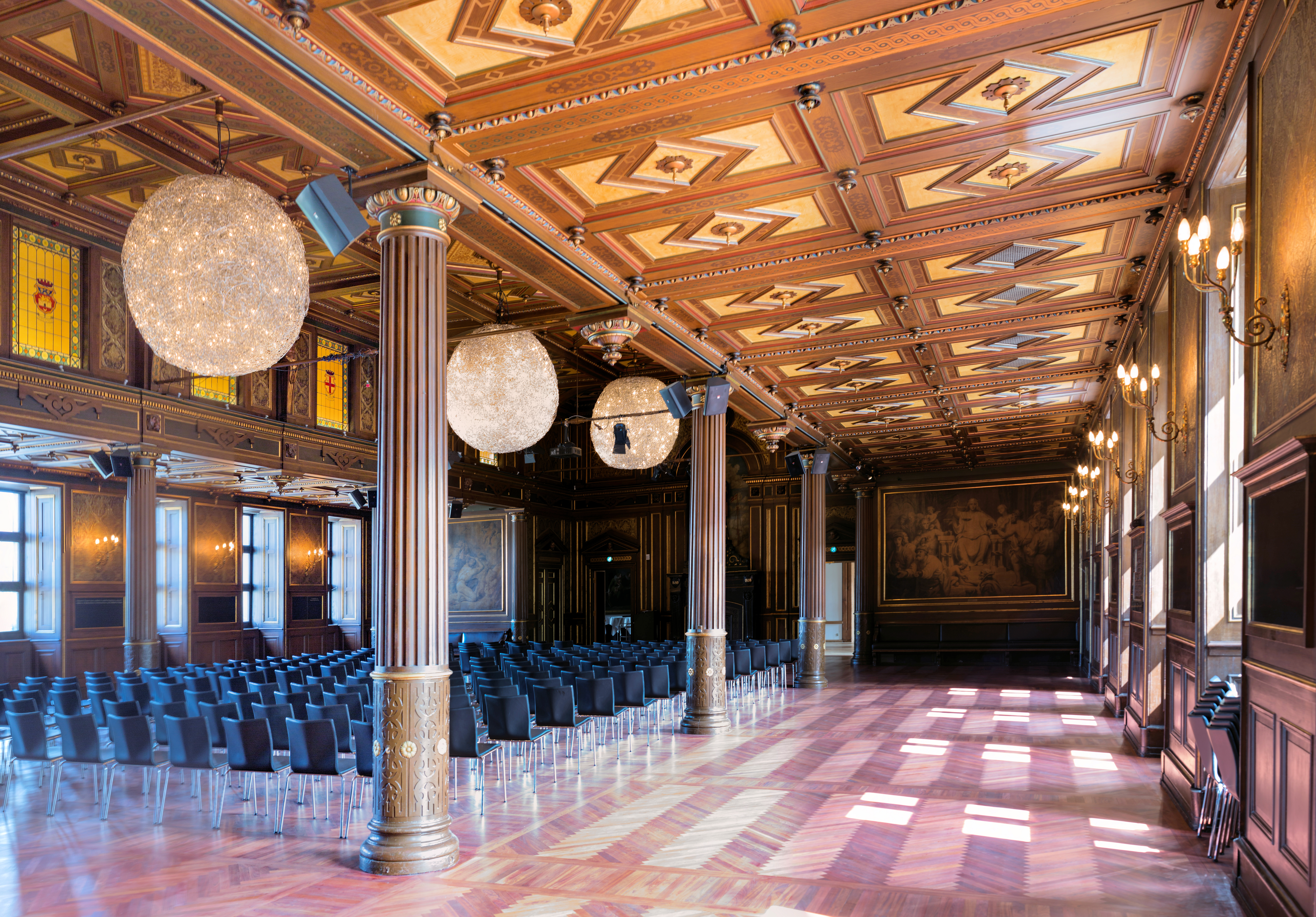
Børssalen

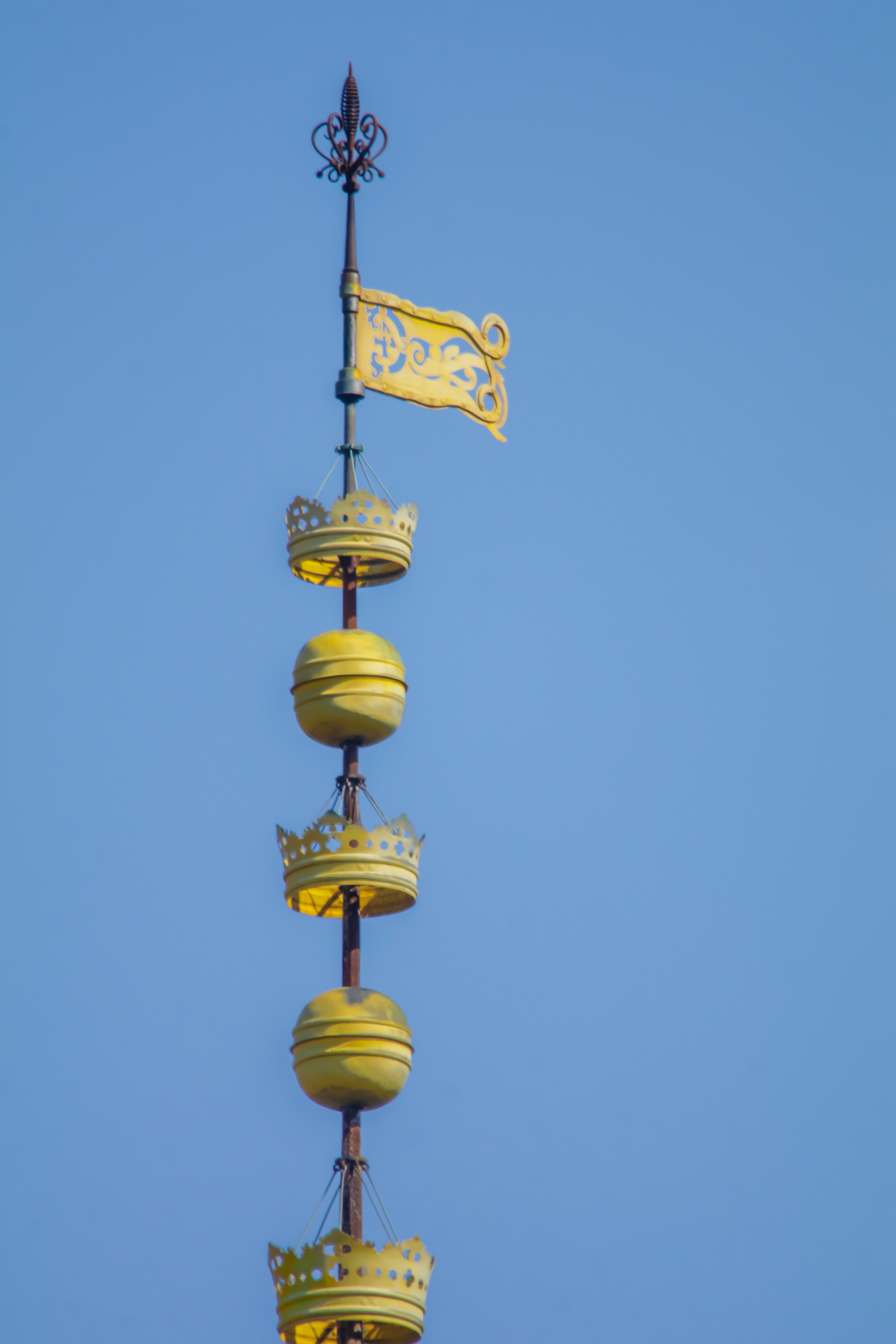
Top of the stock exchange tower in Copenhagen.

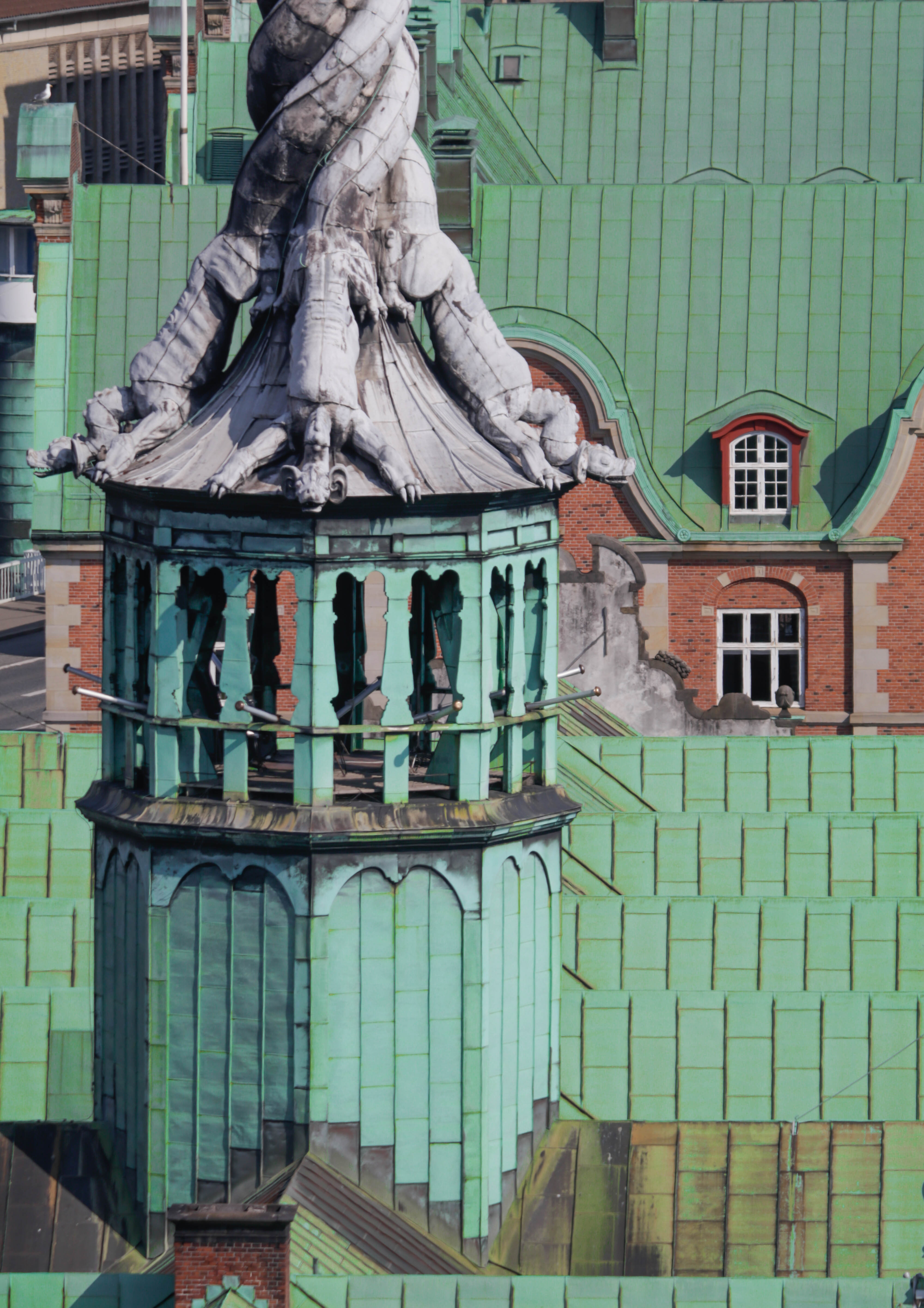
Tower of the stock exchange in Copenhagen (2021)

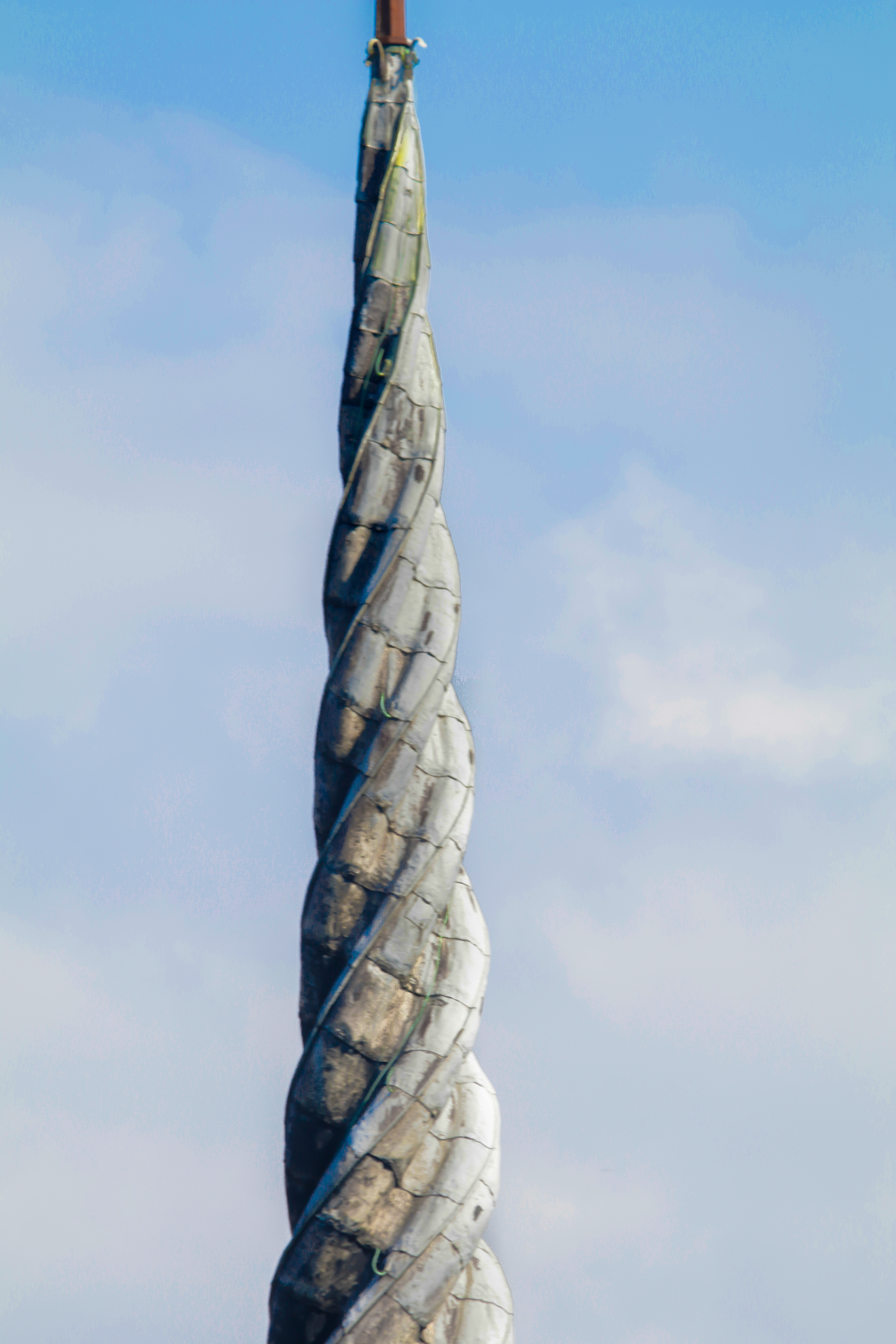
Copenhagen Stock Exchange, part of the tower

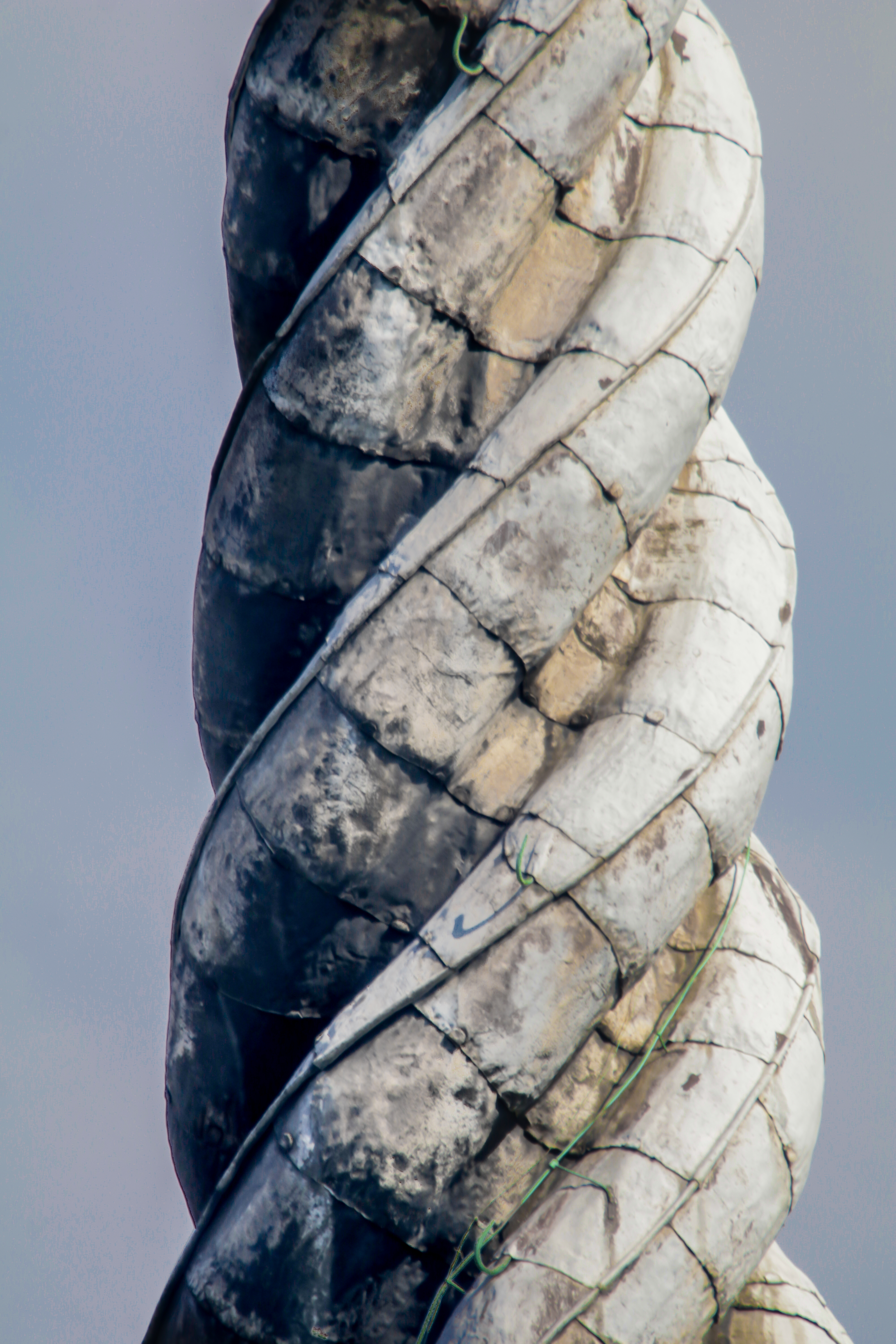
Copenhagen Stock Exchange, part of the tower

== Featured artworks ==
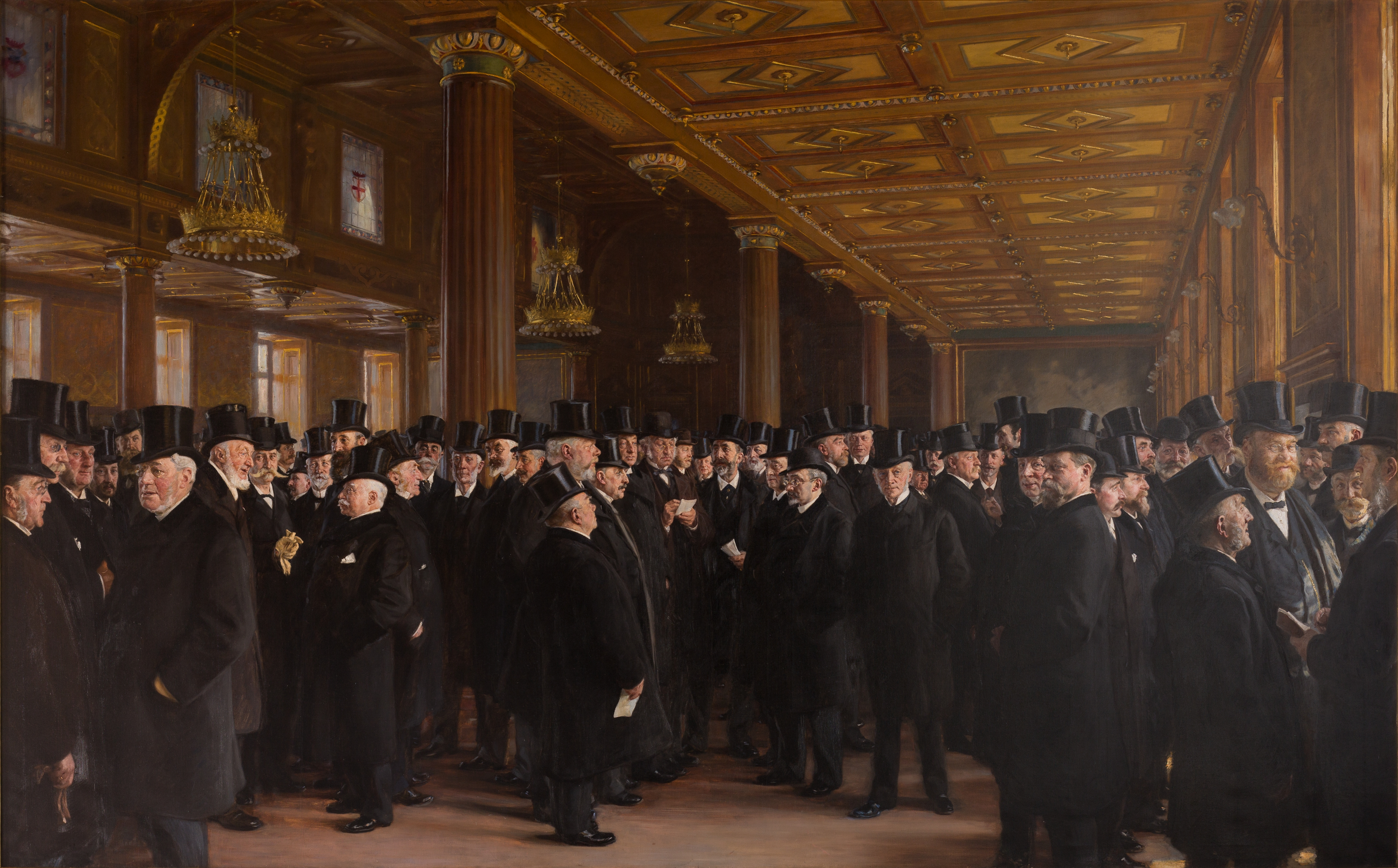
P.S. Krøyer's large group portrait From Copenhagen Stock Exchange

Børsen housed several artworks, including a large number of portraits, both individual portraits and group portraits, as well as Lorenz Frølich's four cartoons in charcoal drawing depicting four virtues: work, justice, courage, and love. But foremost was P. S. Krøyer's large group portrait From Copenhagen Stock Exchange and also a new version of the exchange painting by Thomas Kluge with the 13 committee members from the Chamber of Commerce. Additionally, there was C. F. Høyer's painting Christian IV giver Tyge Brahe en guldkæde from 1810, a Marinebillede by Anton Melbye from 1863, Søstykker by Christian Mølsted from 1890, and Badende ved stranden by William Scharff from 1939.

During the April 2024 fire, a number of historic art pieces dating back centuries, including Peder Severin Krøyer's 1895 group portrait, were rescued by staff and members of the public. The artworks have been temporarily moved to the parliament building as well as the Danish National Archives.

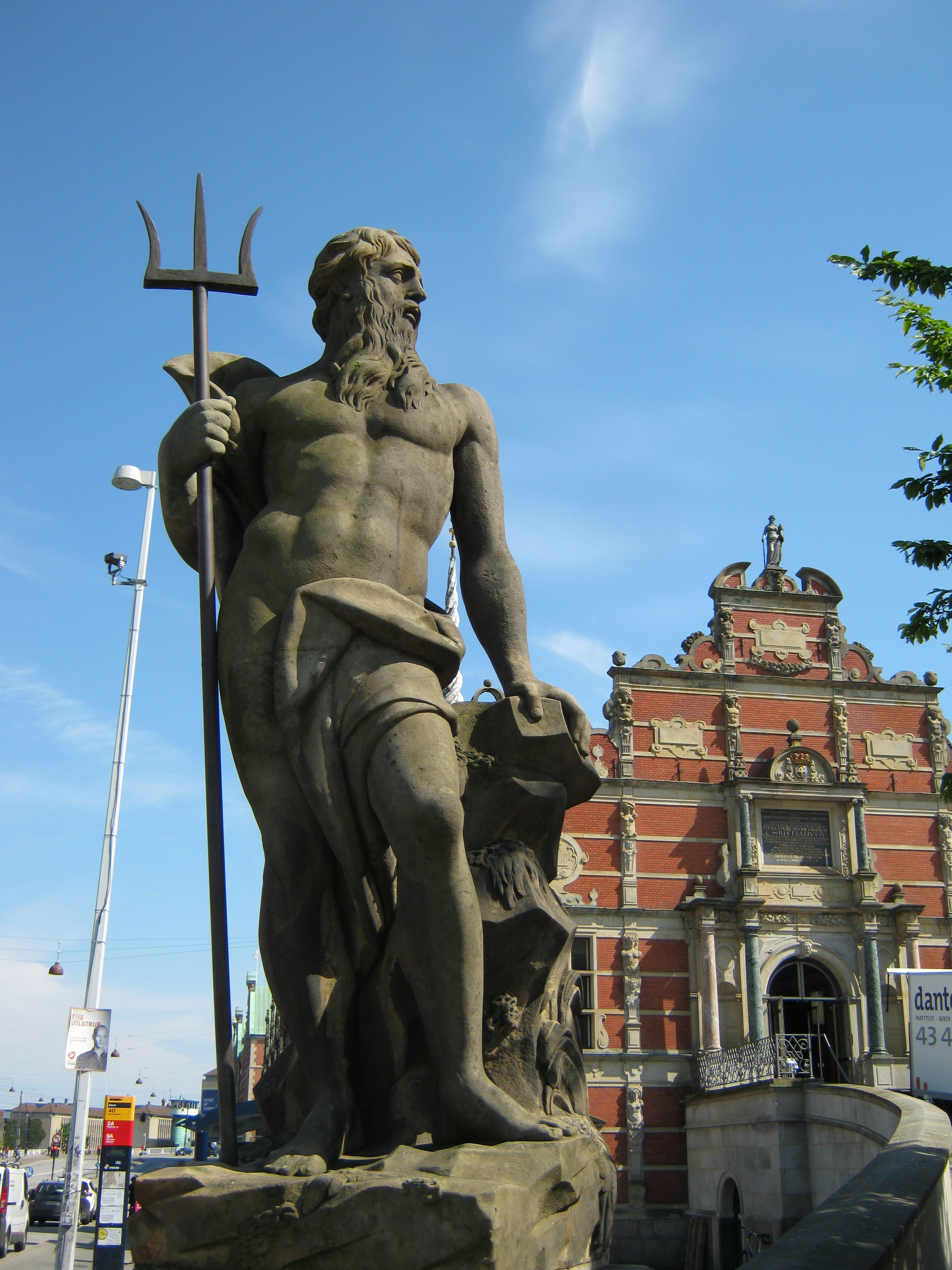
Statue of Neptune at the left side of the ramp

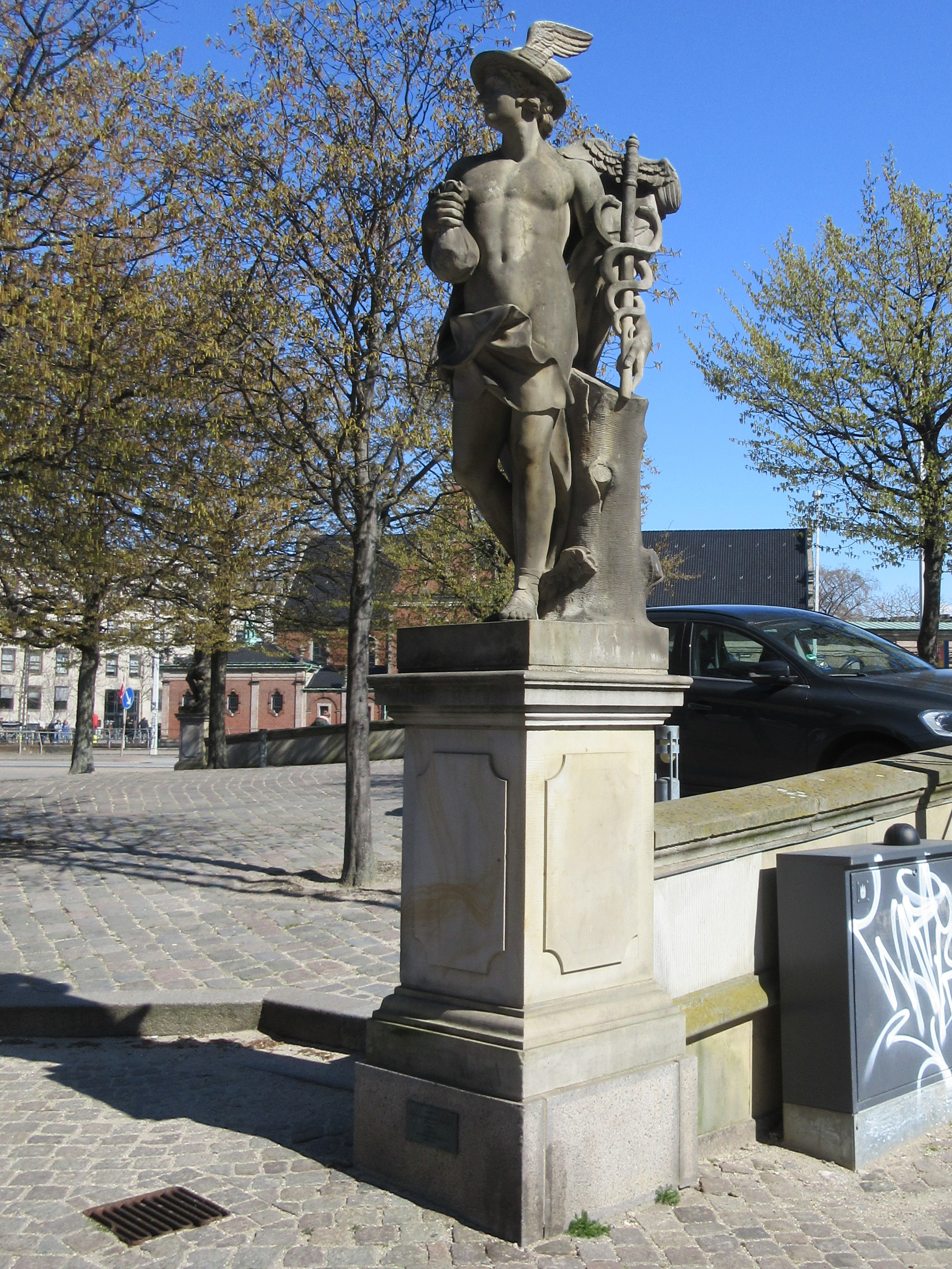
Statue of Mercury at the right side of the ramp

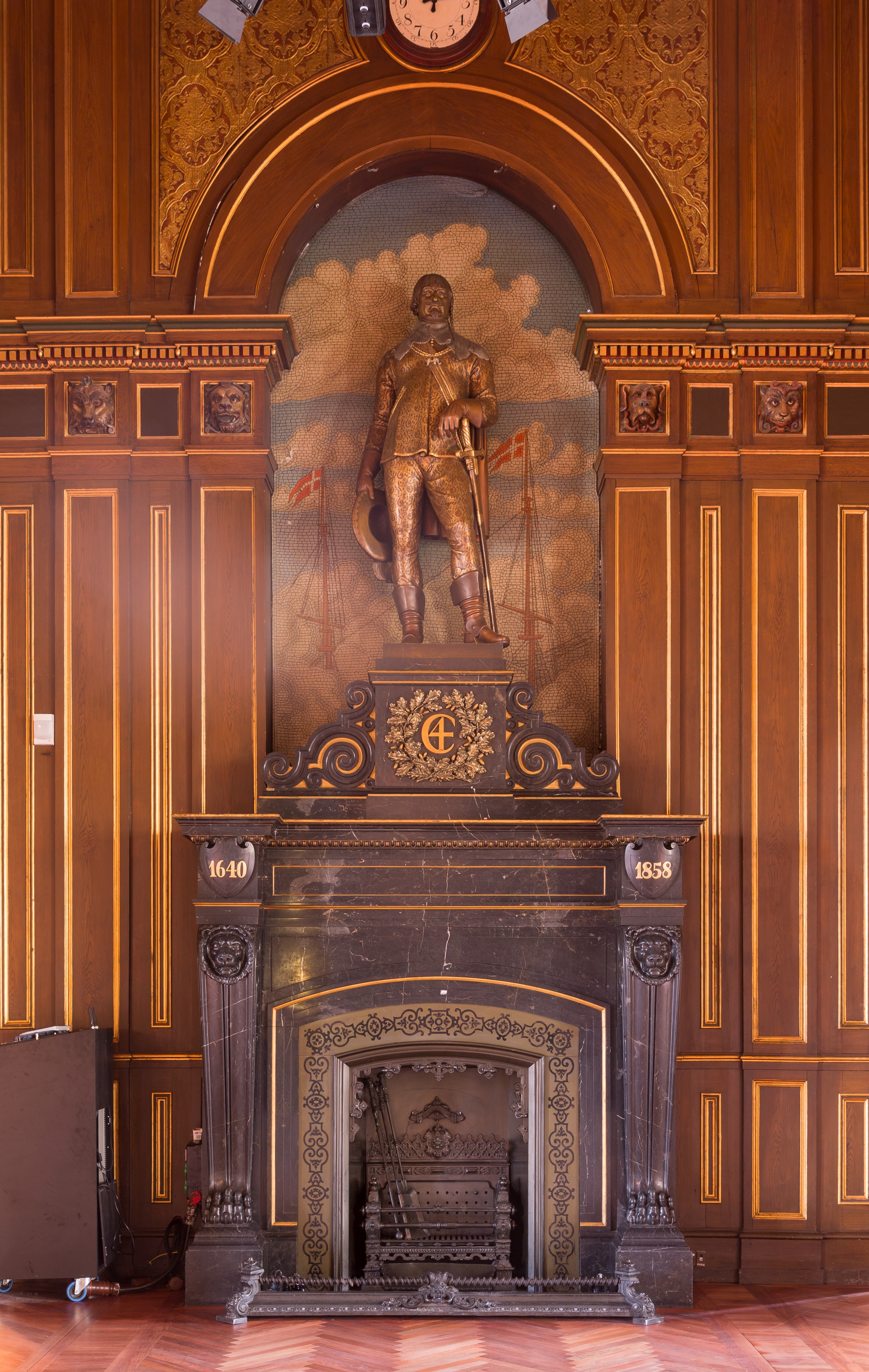
Fireplace

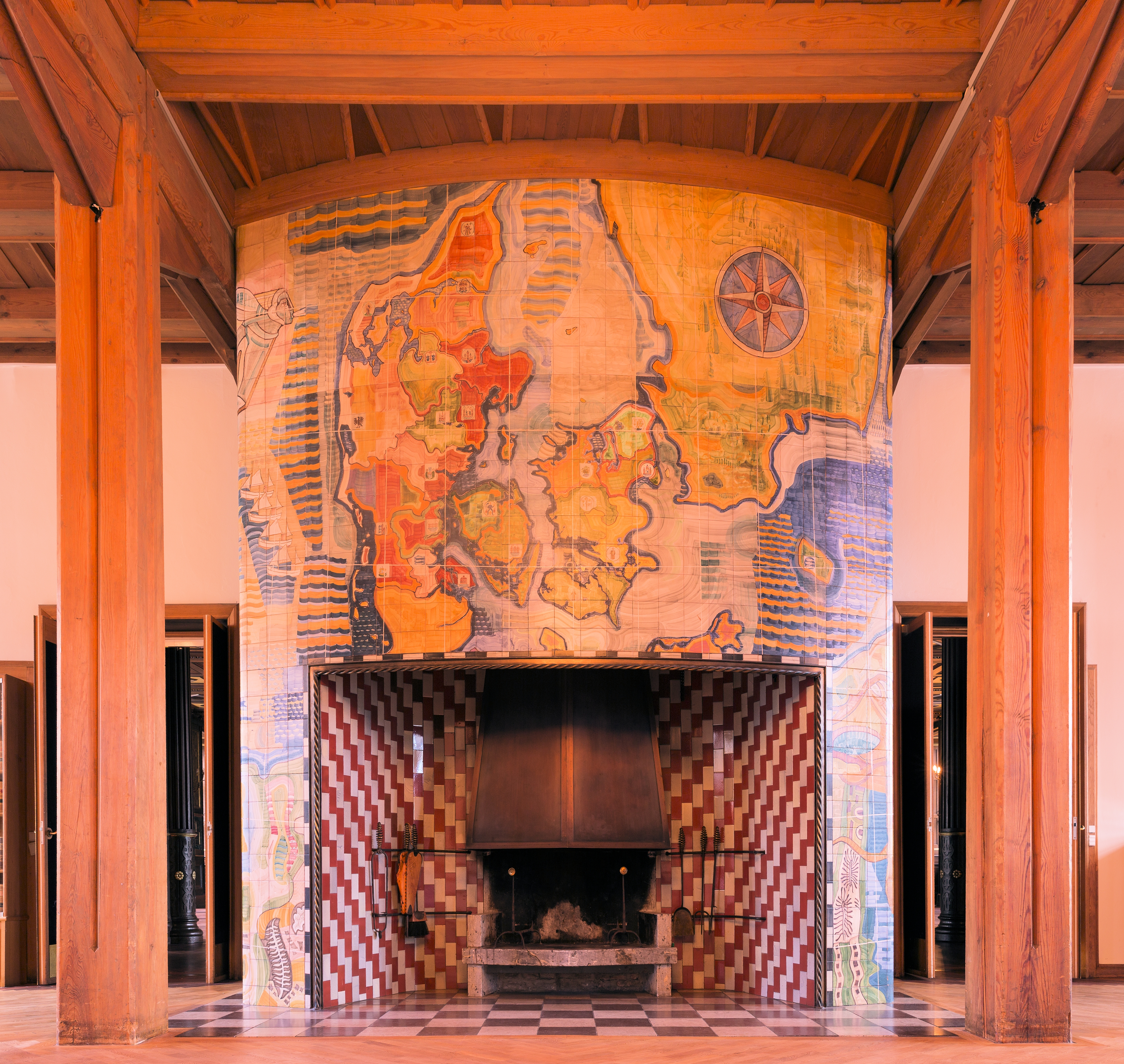
Fireplace

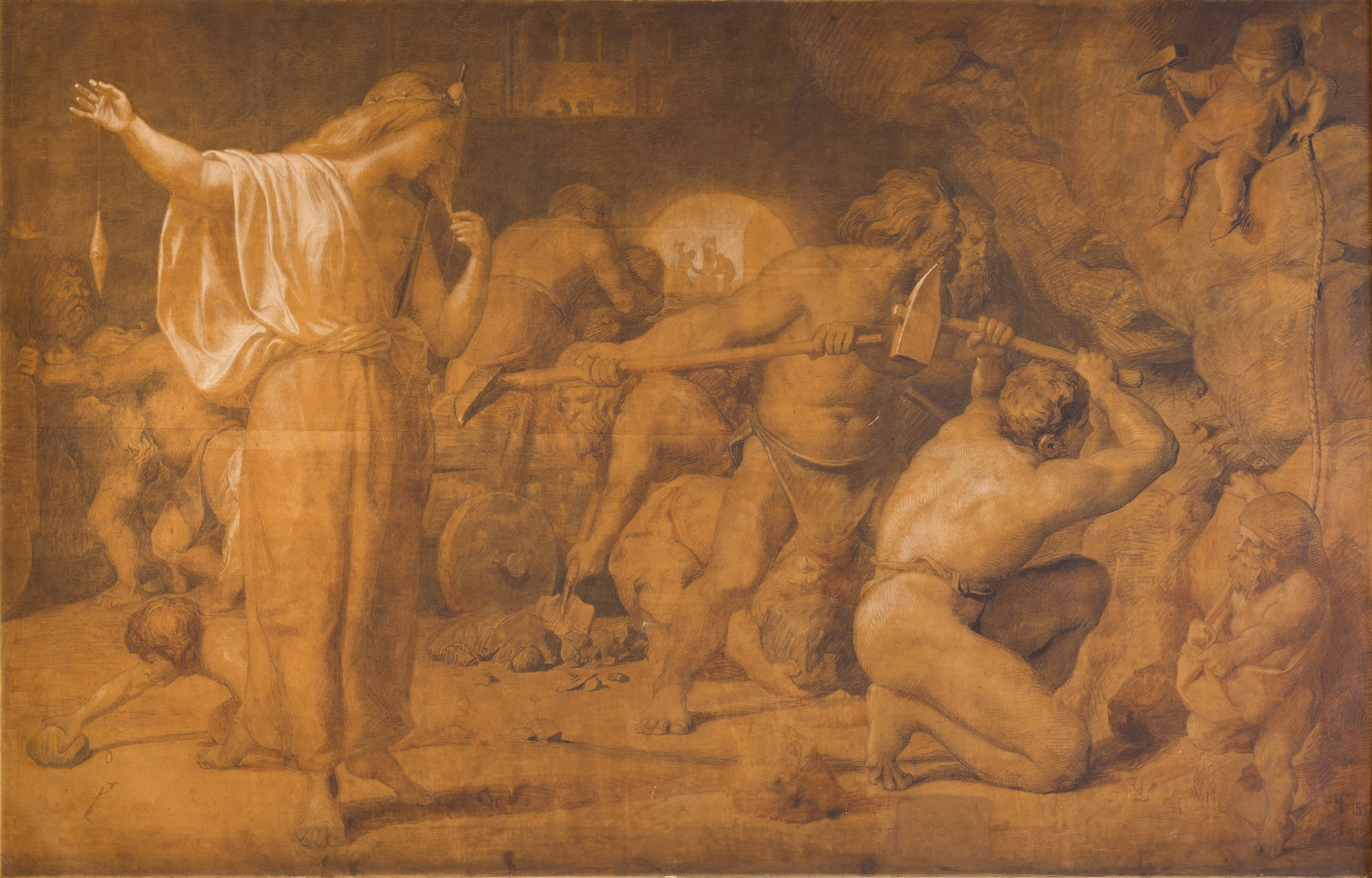
Diligence

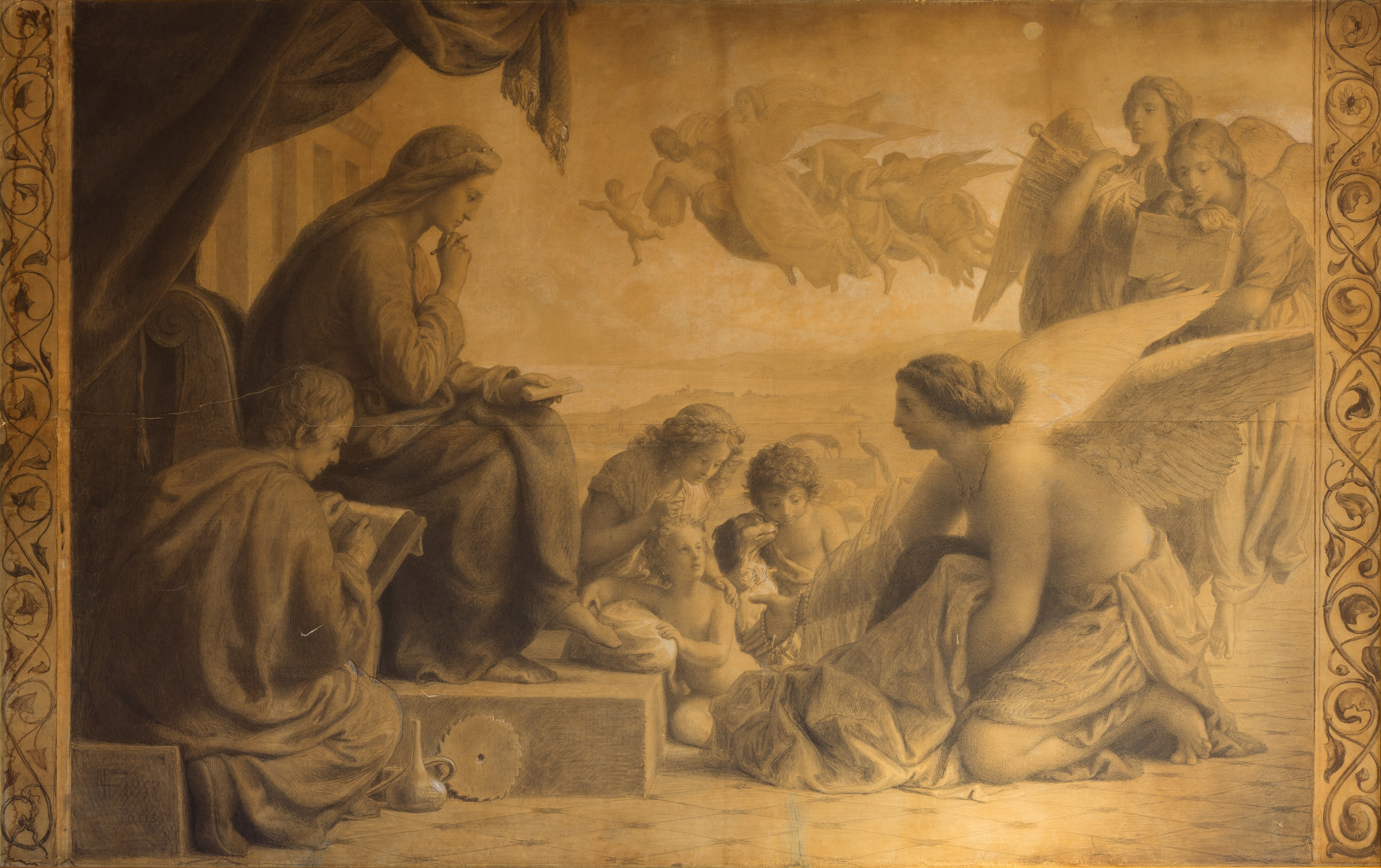
Wisdom

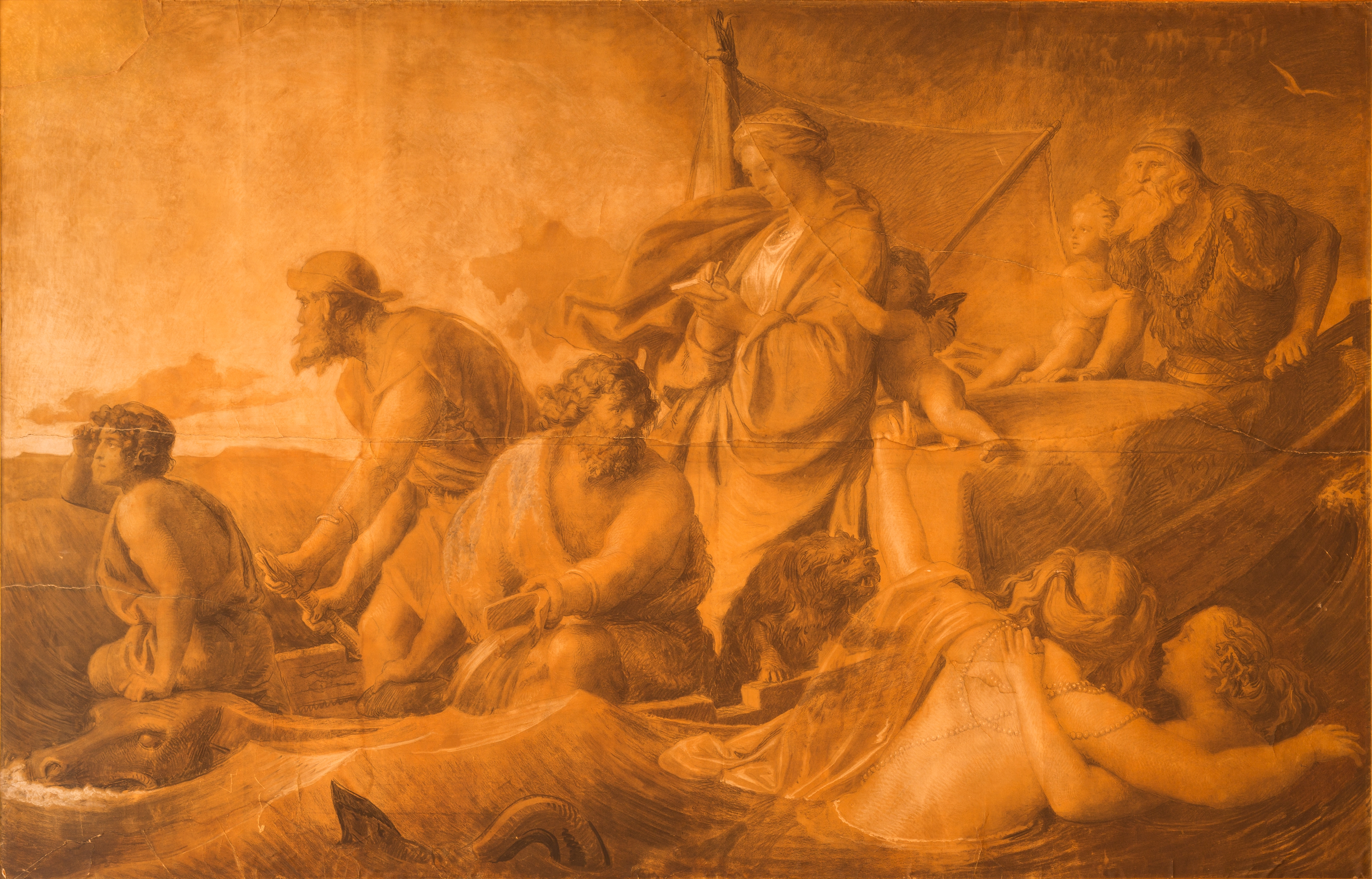
Courage

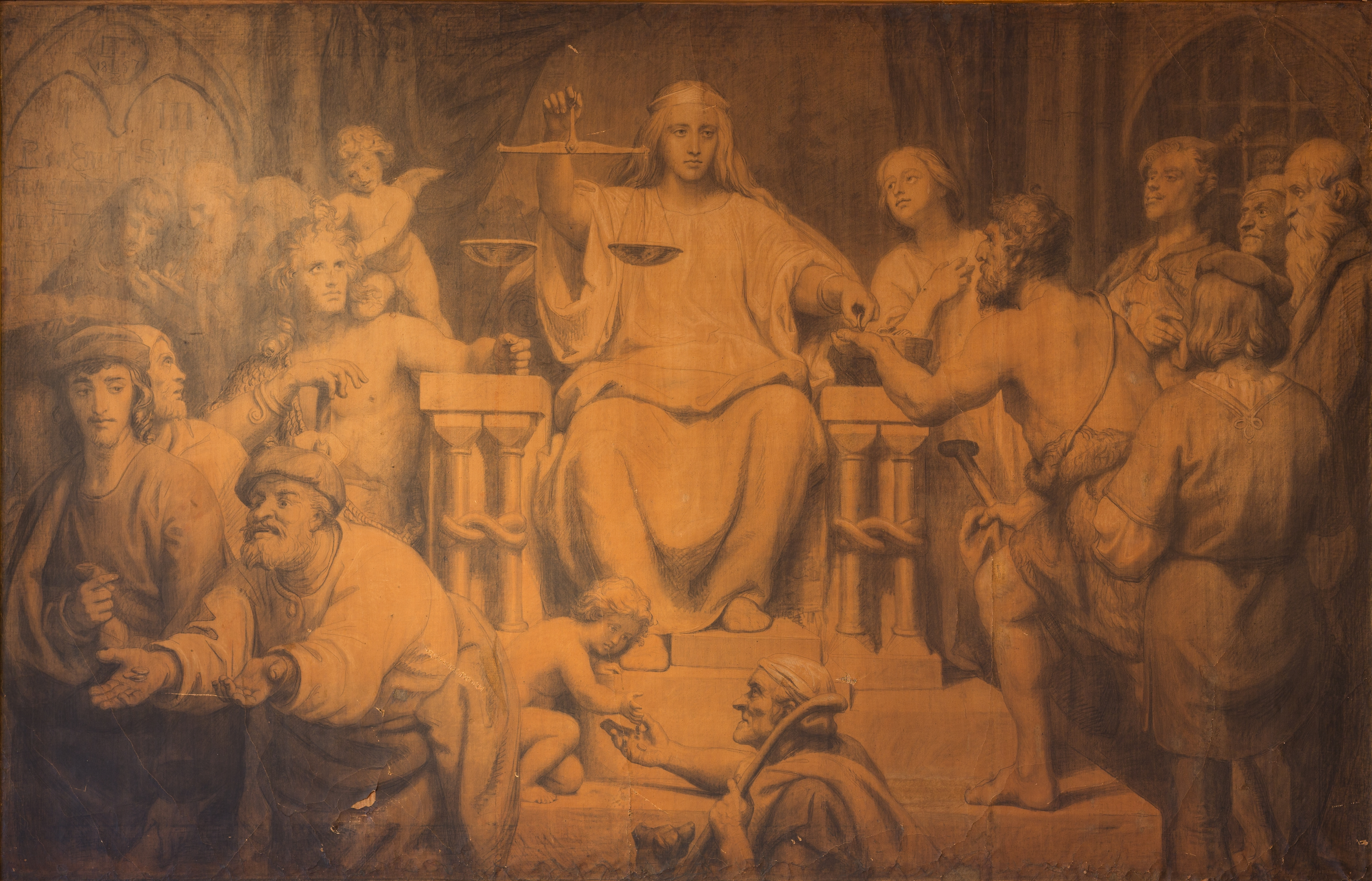
Justice

== See also ==
- Nasdaq Copenhagen
- Danish Brotherhood in America Headquarters
- List of building or structure fires
