= Thomas Kluge =

Danish painter (born 1969)

- Born: March 6, 1969 (age 57); Glostrup, Denmark
- Education: Autodidact
- Occupation: Painter
- Movement: Magic realism
- Spouse: Anna Helleberg Kluge (m. 2007)
- Children: 5
- Awards: Order of the Danneborg (June 2014.)
- Website: thomaskluge.com

Signature
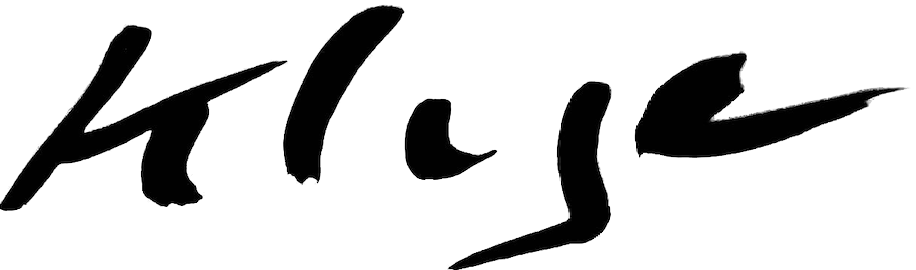

Thomas Kluge (born 1969) is a Danish painter known for his traditional and realistic style. His work has been described as "quite remarkable in its realism and control". He has painted portraits of the Danish royal family.

== Exhibitions ==
- Thomas Kluge. Egne værker, Nivaagaards Malerisamling (2010)
- Thomas Kluge. I tid og rum, Nivaagaards Malerisamling (2011)
