= Danish Chamber of Commerce =

Danish business organization

The Danish Chamber of Commerce (Danish: Dansk Erhverv, lit. 'Danish Enterprise') is the network for the service industry in Denmark and one of the largest professional business organisations in the country. It was headquartered in Børsen in Copenhagen until the 2024 fire and has additional offices in Aarhus, Brussels and New York City.

== History ==
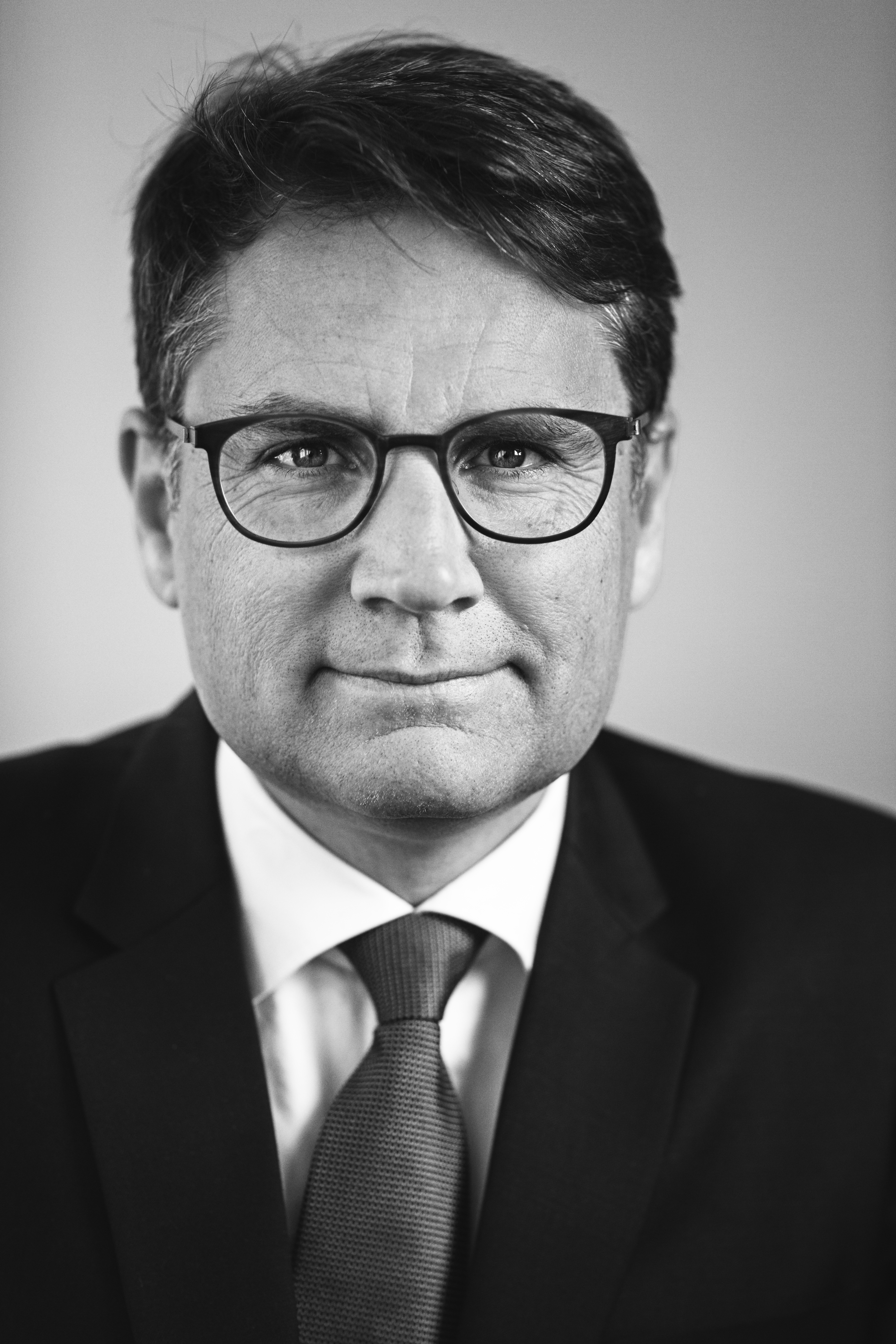
Brian Mikkelsen, CEO of the Danish Chamber of Commerce

The Danish Chamber of Commerce was founded on 1 January 2007 as a result of a merger between Dansk Handel & Service and the Chamber of Commerce (previously Handelskammeret, HTSI).

The first CEO was Lars Krobæk. He was replaced on 1 April 2008 by Jens Klarskov, who was in turn replaced on 22 June 2018 by former Minister and former member of the Danish Parliament, Brian Mikkelsen. On 1 January 2024, Freja Brandhøj was appointed head of entrepreneurship policy. The Danish Chamber of Commerce owns King Christian IV's Old Stock Exchange building on Slotsholmen in Copenhagen, where its headquarters resided until the April 2024 fire. The building is expected to have been rebuilt by 2029.
