= YA =

YA, yA, or Ya may refer to:

== Language ==
- Ya (arrow), the Japanese word for an arrow
- Ya (Cyrillic) (Я), a Cyrillic alphabet letter
- Ya (Javanese) (ꦪ), a letter in the Javanese script
- Ya (kana), the Romanization of the Japanese kana や and ヤ
- Yāʼ (ي), an Arabic letter
- Ya (أيّها), a vocative particle in Arabic and other Semitic languages
- Ya (hangul) (ㅑ), a letter in the Korean hangul alphabet

== Units of measurement ==
- years ago (ya), a unit of time
- Yoctoampere (yA), an SI unit of electric current
- Yottampere (YA), an SI unit of electric current

== Arts, entertainment, and media ==
- Ya (newspaper), a Spanish Catholic newspaper 1935–1996
- ¡Ya!, an album by the band Marquess
- Ya (film), a 2009 Russian sci-fi film with Artur Smolyaninov and Oksana Akinshina
- Yahoo! Answers (YA), a community-driven question-and-answer site
- Young Ace (YA), a Japanese magazine
- Young adult literature, fiction marketed to readers aged 12–18

== Other uses ==
- yA Bank, a part of Resurs Bank in Norway
- Ya (river), a river in Tynset municipality in Innlandet county, Norway
- Yet another (YA), a common initial part of acronyms
- YoungArts (YA), a scholarship program for American high school students
- A US Navy hull classification symbol: Ash barge (YA)
- Afghanistan (aircraft registration prefix YA)

== See also ==
- Ya-ya (disambiguation)
- Yah (disambiguation)
- Yaya (disambiguation)
- Yea (disambiguation)
- Yeah (disambiguation)
