= Yes Yes =

Yes Yes may refer to:

- "Yes Yes", a song by Zion I from their 2006 album Break a Dawn
- "Yes Yes", a song by The Colourist from their 2014 album The Colourist
- "Yes Yes", a song by MoStack from his 2019 album Stacko

== See also ==
- Yes (disambiguation)
- Yeah Yeah (disambiguation)
