= Reopening of Notre-Dame de Paris =

2024 event in France

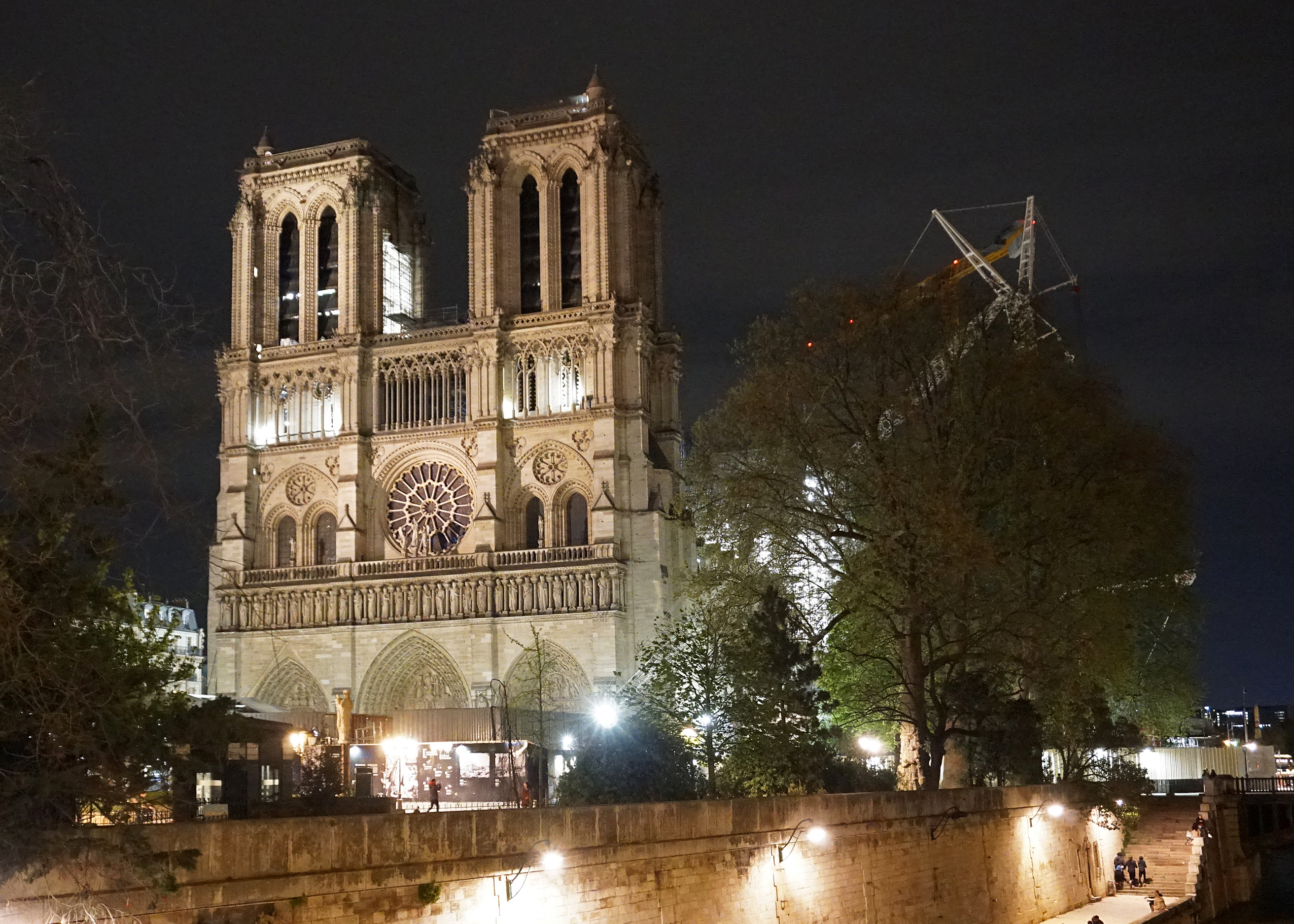
- Notre-Dame de Paris in April 2024

- Notre-Dame Cathedral (Paris) Notre-Dame Cathedral (France)
- Date: 7 December 2024; 22 months ago
- Venue: Notre-Dame de Paris
- Location: 4th arrondissement of Paris, France
- Participants: Among others: Archbishop Laurent Ulrich; President Emmanuel Macron

Notre-Dame de Paris, the medieval Catholic cathedral in Paris, France, was reopened on 7 December 2024 following completion of the restoration work five years after the fire that destroyed the cathedral's spire and roof and caused extensive damage to its interior on 15 April 2019.

The reopening ceremony was presided over by the archbishop of Paris, Laurent Ulrich, in the presence of the French president, Emmanuel Macron, and other dignitaries, including present and former heads of state and government. This was followed by an inaugural mass on 8 December at which a new altar was consecrated, and a series of public services over the following days.

== Background ==
On 15 April 2019, just before 18:20 CEST, a structural fire broke out in the roof space of Notre-Dame de Paris. By the time the fire was extinguished, the wooden spire (flèche) had collapsed, most of the wooden roof had been destroyed, and the cathedral's upper walls were severely damaged. Extensive damage to the interior was prevented by the vaulted stone ceiling, which largely contained the burning roof as it collapsed. Many works of art and religious relics were moved to safety, but others suffered smoke damage, and some of the exterior art was damaged or destroyed. The altar, two pipe organs, and three 13th-century rose windows suffered little or no damage, but the fire contaminated the site and nearby areas of Paris with toxic dust and lead.

On 17 April 2019, the French president, Emmanuel Macron, set a five-year deadline to restore the cathedral. By September 2021, donors had contributed over €840 million to the rebuilding effort.

On 29 November 2024, eight days before the official reopening, Macron and his wife Brigitte, along with the Archbishop of Paris, Laurent Ulrich, toured the renovated cathedral with the chief architect of France's national monuments, Philippe Villeneuve.

== Events ==
=== 7 December ===
The reopening ceremony began just after 19:00 CET with the ringing of the cathedral bells for the first time since 2019 and the reopening of its main doors. The Archbishop of Paris, Laurent Ulrich, ceremonially struck one of the closed doors three times with his crosier. His crosier (staff) had been made from a roof beam that had survived the fire. The cathedral choir, directed by Henri Chalet, responded by singing Psalm 122 (which in English begins "I was glad when they said unto me, Let us go into the house of the Lord") three times in Latin. The third time, the doors were opened, and the choir then sang Totus Tuus by Henryk Górecki as the door opened and a small group of participants, including Ulrich and Macron, entered the nave of the cathedral, where the other guests were already seated.

Following a video presentation of the fire damage and restoration work, images of merci (thank you) in different languages were projected onto the cathedral's western façade as a group of 160 firefighters who had responded to the fire, as well as the artisans and craftspeople who restored the building, stood in front of the congregation and were applauded.

After a performance of an arrangement of the Passacaglia from Handel's Harpsichord Suite in G minor (HWV 432) by Renaud and Gautier Capuçon, Macron gave a speech in which he thanked those involved in the restoration. The apostolic nuncio to France, Archbishop Celestino Migliore, then read a message from Pope Francis (who had declined an invitation to attend the ceremony because of his upcoming visit to Corsica) in which the Pope expressed his joy at joining "in spirit and prayer" with those at the cathedral.

This was followed by a short religious service in which Ulrich blessed the restored organ, which was heard for the first time since 2019 with a series of responses improvised by Olivier Latry, Vincent Dubois, Thierry Escaich and Thibault Fajoles. The ceremony also featured a procession of banners, prayers, hymns and other choral music, including the Te Deum and a new setting of the Magnificat composed by Yves Castagnet. In his homily, Ulrich declared that "it is not only princes, chiefs, and notables who have their place in the Church" but that "the door is open to all", including foreigners and non-believers. New liturgical vestments designed by the fashion designer Jean-Charles de Castelbajac were worn by the clergy at the ceremony for the first time.

A live concert in the forecourt of the cathedral was also planned but, due to the anticipated effects of Storm Darragh, it was recorded a day earlier by the public broadcaster France Télévisions and aired after the service. It included performances by pianist Lang Lang, cellist Yo-Yo Ma, opera singers Pretty Yende and Julie Fuchs, and singers Angélique Kidjo and Hiba Tawaji, as well as Pharrell Williams, Benjamin Bernheim, Marion Cotillard, Khatia Buniatishvili, and Daniel Lozakovich.

=== 8 December ===
An inaugural mass, held on the Catholic Feast of the Immaculate Conception and Second Sunday of Advent, took place at 10:30 CET and was presided over by Archbishop Ulrich, who consecrated the new high altar and placed inside it the relics of five saints. President Macron and his wife, as well as other heads of state and government and senior French politicians, once again attended.

At the Archbishop's invitation, nearly 170 bishops from France and around the world participated in the service, along with one priest from each of the 106 parishes in the Diocese of Paris and one priest from each of the seven Eastern Catholic Churches, accompanied by parishioners from these communities. Among the clergy were Cardinals Timothy M. Dolan, Bechara Boutros al-Rahi and Dominik Duka and Archbishop Eamon Martin.

At 18:30 CET the cathedral held its first mass open to the public.

=== Subsequent events ===
Special services were held from 8 to 15 December as part of an "octave of reopening", including the return of the crown of thorns on 13 December, and were broadcast live on the French Catholic television channel KTO. Two concerts of Johann Sebastian Bach's Magnificat were performed on 17 and 18 December, and weekly concerts and other events continued until June 2025.

Outside of service times, the public was first admitted at 15:30 on 9 December, with restricted opening hours during the first week. Normal opening hours began on 16 December, with reservations required in advance via the cathedral website.

== Attendees ==
=== Domestic ===
At the reopening ceremony on 7 December, Macron was accompanied by his wife Brigitte and the mayor of Paris, Anne Hidalgo. Current and former government representatives included the outgoing prime minister Michel Barnier and his predecessors Édouard Philippe and Gabriel Attal; former presidents Nicolas Sarkozy and François Hollande with their spouses Carla Bruni (in Dior) and Julie Gayet; culture minister Rachida Dati; and former ministers Jack Lang and Bruno Le Maire.

Other politicians attending the ceremony included Marine Le Pen and Jordan Bardella of the National Rally, and François Bayrou of the Democratic Movement. The Count of Paris also attended, as did François-Henri Pinault, his wife Salma Hayek and Bernard Arnault in their capacity as major financial contributors to the restoration, as well as actress Carole Bouquet, journalist Laurence Ferrari and designer Jean-Charles de Castelbajac.

=== International ===
The ceremony on 7 December was also attended by a large number of current and former heads of state and government, as well as senior officials of international organisations. Other international guests included the former US Secretary of State John Kerry and the businessman Elon Musk.

Countries and subnational divisions

- Edi Rama, Prime Minister of Albania, and spouse Linda Rama
- Joan Enric Vives i Sicília, Co-Prince of Andorra, and viceregal representative Josep Maria Mauri
- Sir Rodney Williams, Governor-General of Antigua and Barbuda, and Sandra, Lady Williams
- Nikol Pashinyan, Prime Minister of Armenia, and spouse Anna Hakobyan
- Karl Nehammer, Chancellor of Austria, and spouse Katharina Nidetzky
- (Belgium) The King and Queen of the Belgians
- Željko Komšić, Member of the Presidency of Bosnia and Herzegovina
- Rumen Radev, President of Bulgaria, and First Lady Desislava Radeva
- Félix Tshisekedi, President of the Democratic Republic of the Congo, and First Lady Denise Nyakéru Tshisekedi
- Denis Sassou Nguesso, President of the Republic of the Congo, and First Lady Antoinette Sassou Nguesso
- Zoran Milanović, President of Croatia, and First Lady Sanja Musić Milanović
- Alar Karis, President of Estonia, and First Lady Sirje Karis
- Alexander Stubb, President of Finland
- Brice Oligui Nguema, Transitional President of Gabon, and First Lady Zita Nyangue Oligui
- (Georgia (country)) Salome Zourabichvili, President of Georgia
- Frank-Walter Steinmeier, President of Germany, and First Lady Elke Büdenbender
- Katerina Sakellaropoulou, President of Greece, and partner Pavlos Kotsonis
- Umaro Sissoco Embaló, President of Guinea-Bissau
- Tamás Sulyok, President of Hungary
- Sergio Mattarella, President of Italy, and daughter Laura Mattarella
- Giorgia Meloni, Prime Minister of Italy
- Vjosa Osmani, President of Kosovo, and First Gentleman Prindon Sadriu
- Nechirvan Barzani, President of Kurdistan Region
- Prince Philipp of Liechtenstein, representing the Prince of Liechtenstein
- Gitanas Nausėda, President of Lithuania, and First Lady Diana Nausėdienė
- The Grand Duke and Grand Duchess of Luxembourg
- The Prince of Monaco
- Prince Moulay Rachid of Morocco, representing the King of Morocco
- Dick Schoof, Prime Minister of the Netherlands
- Gordana Siljanovska-Davkova, President of North Macedonia
- The Queen of Norway, representing the King of Norway
- Santiago Peña, President of Paraguay, and First Lady Leticia Ocampos
- Andrzej Duda, President of Poland, and First Lady Agata Kornhauser-Duda
- François Legault, Premier of Quebec (Canada)
- Francesca Civerchia and Dalibor Riccardi, Captains Regent of San Marino
- Patrice Trovoada, Prime Minister of São Tomé and Príncipe
- Miloš Vučević, Prime Minister of Serbia
- Robert Golob, Prime Minister of Slovenia
- Ulf Kristersson, Prime Minister of Sweden
- Faure Gnassingbé, President of Togo
- Volodymyr Zelenskyy, President of Ukraine
- The Prince of Wales, representing the King of the United Kingdom
- Jill Biden, First Lady of the United States and daughter Ashley Biden
- Donald Trump, former president and president-elect of the United States
- (Vatican City) Archbishop Celestino Migliore, apostolic nuncio to France, representing Pope Francis

International organisations

- Alain Berset, Secretary General of the Council of Europe, and spouse Muriel Zeender
- (European Union) Roberta Metsola, President of the European Parliament, and spouse Ukko Metsola
- Audrey Azoulay, Director-General of UNESCO, and spouse François-Xavier Labarraque
- Thomas Bach, President of the International Olympic Committee
- (Organisation internationale de la Francophonie) Louise Mushikiwabo, Secretary-General of La Francophonie
- Mathias Cormann, Secretary-General of the OECD
- Christine Lagarde, President of the European Central Bank
