= Yes =

Yes or YES most often refers to:

- An affirmative particle in the English language; see yes and no

Yes or YES may also refer to:

== Education ==
- YES Prep Public Schools, Houston, Texas, US
- Young Eisner Scholars, in Los Angeles, New York City, Chicago, and Appalachia, US
- Young Epidemiology Scholars, US

== Technology ==
- yes (Unix), command to output "y" or a string repeatedly
- Philips :YES, a 1985 home computer

== Transportation ==
- Yasuj Airport, Iran (IATA airport code: YES)
- YES Airways, later OLT Express, Poland

== Organizations ==
- European Solidarity (abbr. YeS), a political party in Ukraine
- Yale Entrepreneurial Society, US
- YES. Snowboards, a manufacturer of snowboards
- The YES! Association, a Swedish artist collective
- Young European Socialists formally ECOSY
- Youth Empowerment Scheme, a children's charity, Belfast, Northern Ireland
- Youth Energy Squad, a student-run, non-profitable green Project Based on Exchange established by AIESEC by University Sains Malaysia
- YES (Lithuania), a centre-right political party in Lithuania
- Young Engineers Sportscar, or YES!, a German sports car manufacturer
- Yes, the trade name of YTL Communications, a mobile network operator in Malaysia

== Literature ==
- Yes! (Hong Kong magazine)
- Yes! (U.S. magazine), a magazine focused on social justice and sustainability
- Yes! (Philippine magazine), a showbiz-oriented magazine
- Yes (novel), 1978, by Thomas Bernhard
- Yes: My Improbable Journey to the Main Event of WrestleMania, by Bryan Danielson, also known as Daniel Bryan

== Film, television and radio ==
=== Film ===
- Yes (2004 film), a romantic drama by Sally Potter
- Yes (2025 film), a satire film by Nadav Lapid

=== Television ===
- yes (company), an Israeli satellite television provider
- YES Network, Yankees Entertainment and Sports Network
- Yes TV, a Canadian religious television system

=== Radio stations ===
- WTKN, formerly Yes 94.5, in Myrtle Beach, South Carolina, US
- YES 933, a Singaporean radio station
- Yes FM, in Colombo, Sri Lanka
- Yes FM (Philippines), a Philippine FM radio network owned by MBC Media Group
  - 101.1 Yes FM, its flagship station

== Music ==
=== Albums ===
- Yes (Yes album), by rock band Yes, 1969
- The Yes Album, by rock band Yes, 1971
- Yes (Alvin Slaughter album), 1997
- Yes! (Chad Brock album), 2000
- Yes! (Jason Mraz album), 2014
- Yes! (k-os album), 2009
- Yes (Mika Nakashima album), 2007
- Yes (Morphine album), 1995
- Yes (Pet Shop Boys album), 2009, or the title track
- Yes (Shinichi Atobe album), 2020
- Yes! (Slum Village album), 2015
- Yes!, classical album by Julie Fuchs 2015
- Yes L.A., 1979 punk rock compilation EP
- Yes. (EP), 2021, by Golden Child
- ¥€$, 2018 album by Tommy Cash

=== Songs ===
- "Yes" (Fat Joe, Cardi B and Anuel AA song), 2019
- "Yes" (Ben and Tan song), 2020
- "Yes!" (Chad Brock song), 2000
- "Yes" (Coldplay song), 2008
- "Yes" (LMFAO song), 2009
- "Yes" (McAlmont & Butler song), 1995
- "Yes" (Sam Feldt song), 2017
- "Yes!" by Amber, 2002
- "Yes", by Beyoncé, from Dangerously in Love, 2003
- "Yes", by Big Sean, from Better Me Than You, 2024
- "Yes", by Billy Swan, 1983
- "Yes", by Black Sheep (group), 1991
- "Yes", by Connie Cato, 1975
- "Yes", by Craig Davis from 22, 2022
- "Yes", by Demi Lovato, from Confident, 2015
- "Yes", by The Family, 1985
- "Yes", by Grapefruit, 1968
- "Yes", by Jay & The Americans, 1962
- "Yes", by Johnny Sandon And The Remo Four, 1963
- "Yes", by Karl Wolf feat. Super Sako, Deena, Fito Blanko, 2019
- "Yes!", by Kyle (musician), 2020
- "YES", by Louisa Johnson feat. 2 Chainz, 2018
- "Yes", by Manic Street Preachers, from The Holy Bible, 1994
- "Yes", by Merry Clayton, 1987 (from the Dirty Dancing film soundtrack)
- "Yes", by Tim Moore, 1985
- "Yes", by twlv, 2024
- "Yes Yes Yes", a remix of "Sexy! No No No..." by Girls Aloud from Tangled Up
- "Yes, Yes, Yes", by Bill Cosby, from Bill Cosby Is Not Himself These Days, 1976

=== Other uses in music ===
- Yes (band), English progressive rock band
  - Yes Featuring Jon Anderson, Trevor Rabin, Rick Wakeman, a spinoff of this band
- Yes (operetta), 1928, by Maurice Yvain

== Other uses ==
- Yalta European Strategy, a series of annual conferences in Ukraine
- Yes Yes Yes (horse), Australian thoroughbred racehorse

== See also ==
- Yesss (disambiguation)
