= Yeah Yeah Yeah =

Yeah Yeah Yeah may refer to:

== Music ==
- Yeah Yeah Yeahs, an American rock band

=== Albums ===
- Yeah Yeah Yeah (compilation), a garage rock compilation album, 1999
- Yeah Yeah Yeah, by the Blondes, 1990
- Yeah Yeah Yeahs (EP), by the Yeah Yeah Yeahs, 2001
- Yeah Yeah Yeah, by Cast, 2026

=== Songs ===
- "Yeah Yeah Yeah" (Blackpink song), 2022
- "Yeah Yeah Yeah" (Louis Prima song), 1951
- "Yeah Yeah Yeah" (New Politics song), 2010
- "Yeah! Yeah! Yeah!" (Oaktown's 357 song), 1989
- "Yeah! Yeah! Yeah!" (Simone Hines song), 1997
- "Yeah 3x" (pronounced "Yeah Yeah Yeah"), by Chris Brown, 2010
- "Yeah Yeah Yeah", by Alice Cooper, B-side of the single "Be My Lover", 1972
- "Yeah Yeah Yeah", by Bo Diddley from Hey! Good Lookin', 1965
- "Yeah Yeah Yeah", by Jax Jones, 2015
- "Yeah Yeah Yeah", by Judson Spence, 1988
- "Yeah Yeah Yeah", by Lil' Mo, 2005
- "Yeah Yeah Yeah", by the Sounds from Something to Die For, 2011
- "Yeah Yeah Yeah", by Uncle Kracker from Double Wide, 2000
- "Yeah, Yeah, Yeah!", by Voices, 1992

== See also ==
- "She Loves You", a 1963 song by the Beatles that frequently uses the phrase "Yeah, Yeah, Yeah!"
- "Ignoreland", a 1992 song by R.E.M.
- Yeah Yeah Yeah Yeah, the Bikini Kill side of a 1993 split album with Huggy Bear
- "Yeah Yeah Yeah Yeah Yeah", a 1988 song by the Pogues
- Yeah (disambiguation)
- Yeah Yeah (disambiguation)
