= Yah =

Yah may refer to:

- Jah, shortened form of Yahweh, the Hebrew name for God
- Iah, ancient Egyptian male lunar deity
- YAH, The IATA code for La Grande-4 Airport in northern Quebec, Canada
- Yazgulyam language, by ISO 639 code
- "Yah" (song), by Kendrick Lamar from his album Damn
- a young person from a particular class or subcultural group in the UK, also known as a 'rah'

== See also ==
- IAH (disambiguation)
- YA (disambiguation)
