= Yesss =

Yesss is a common elongation of the word Yes and may refer to:

- Yesss, a subsidiary of the mobile network provider A1 Telekom Austria
- The YeSSS Unified Satellite Communication System; see Gorizont
- Yesss, a character in the animated film Ralph Breaks the Internet

== See also ==
- Yes (disambiguation)
