= Yaya =

Yaya or Yayah may refer to:

== People ==
=== Given name ===
- Liu Zhenya (born 1952), Chinese internet celebrity expelled from Taiwan whose online name is "Yaya"
- Urassaya Sperbund (Yaya; born 1993), Thai actress
- Yaya Banhoro (born 1996), Burkinabé footballer
- Yaya Bey (born 1990), American R&B musician
- Yaya Bojang (born 2005), Gambian footballer
- Yaya Ceesay (1937–2026), Gambian politician
- Yaya Cissokho (born 1957), Senegalese basketball player
- Yaya Coulibaly (born 1993), Malian puppet designer, puppeteer, and storyteller
- Yaya DaCosta (born 1982), America's Next Top Model contestant
- Yaya Diallo (born 1946), Malian musician and author
- Yaya Dissa (born 1975), Malian footballer
- Yaya Dillo Djérou (1974–2024), Chadian politician
- Yaya Dukuly (born 2003), Liberian-Australian footballer
- Yaya Fink (born 1984), Israeli social and political activist
- Yaya Fofana (born 2004), Ivorian footballer
- YaYa Gosselin (born 2009), American actress
- Yaya Han (born 1980), Chinese-American cosplayer
- Yaya Hartzenberg (born 1989), South African rugby union player
- Yayah Jalloh (born 1981), Sierra Leonean footballer
- Yayah Kallon (born 2001), Sierra Leonean footballer
- Yaya Kerim (born 1991), Chadian footballer
- Yaya Meledje (born 1997), Ivorian footballer
- Yaya Migansi (1850–1932), princess of Dahomey, present-day Benin
- Yaya Samaké (born 1999), Malian footballer
- Yaya Sanogo (born 1993), French football player
- Yaya Sanou (born 1993), Burkinabé footballer
- Yaya Seyba (born 1957), Malian sprinter
- Yaya Sherfedinov (1894–1975), Soviet-Crimean Tatar composer, musician, and poet
- Yaya Soumahoro (born 1989), Ivorian footballer
- Yaya Soumaré (born 2000), French footballer
- Yaya Sow, Guinean politician
- Yaya Bauchi Tongo (1963–2026), Nigerian businessman and politician
- Yaya Touré (born 1983), Ivorian football player

=== Surname ===
- Faouzi Yaya (born 1989), Algerian football player

== Places ==
- Yaya, Çan
- Yaya, Congo, district of Niari Department in the Republic of Congo
- Yaya, Russia, an urban-type settlement in Kemerovo Oblast, Russia
- Yaya (river), a river in Kemerovo Oblast, Russia
- Yaya Island, Russia
- La Yaya Dam, in Cuba
- Yaya, DR Congo, district of Kwilu Province in the Democratic Republic of Congo
- Yaya Mongombala, DR Congo, district of Kwilu Province in the Democratic Republic of Congo

== Characters ==
- Yaya Dub, a character played by Maine Mendoza in a comedy segment called "Kalyeserye" in the Filipino noontime show Eat Bulaga!
- Yaya, a 2009 fictional character from the light novel series Unbreakable Machine-Doll
- Yaya Nanto, a character from the anime series Strawberry Panic
- Yaya Yuiki, a character from the manga series Shugo Chara!
- Yaya, a character from the Malaysian animated series BoBoiBoy and BoBoiBoy Galaxy

== Music ==
- Yaya Kim, South Korean solo music project by Kim Eunji
- Ya! Ya!, a 1964 album by saxophonist Budd Johnson
- "Yaya" (song), a 2020 single by 6ix9ine
- "Ya Ya" (Beyoncé song), 2024
- "Ya Ya" (Lee Dorsey song), 1961, covered by Dalida, Petula Clark and others
- Yaya, a 1982 album of Nino Buonocore
- Ya Ya, a 1994 album by Mitsou
- "Yaya", a song by Tara VanFlower from My Little Fire-Filled Heart, 2005
- "Ya Ya", a song by Yeat, from the album Up 2 Me
- Ya-ya, a trombone technique of Tricky Sam Nanton

== Other ==
- Ya Ya (film), a 2013 Tamil language film
- Yaya (military), infantry military units of the Ottoman Empire and some other medieval Anatolian emirates
- YaYa's Flame Broiled Chicken, an American fast food chicken chain
- Ya Ya (panda), a panda
- Ya-Ya, a series of novels by Rebecca Wells

== See also ==
- Yeah Yeah (disambiguation)
