= Julie Fuchs =

French soprano (born 1984)

Julie Fuchs (born 24 July 1984) is a French soprano known for her interpretation of light-lyric repertoire.

== Childhood and studies ==
Born in Meaux, France to a father who was a manager, and a mother who was a swimming teacher, Fuchs grew up in Avignon. At age 7, she began violin lessons and started studying music theory and history at the Avignon Conservatory. After singing a variety of repertoire (pop, jazz...), she was selected to be part of a European choir, "Voices of Europe" with whom she toured Europe, and sang with Björk during the recording of "Which was the Son of" by Arvo Pärt. This experience marked a turning point in her young musical life, as she discovered a desire to explore singing. At age 18, she began private classical voice lessons and acting lessons.

In 2006, Fuchs entered the Conservatoire of Paris, considered the top conservatory in France. There, she made her first operatic role debuts as Elle in L'amour masqué by Messager and Susanna in Mozart's Le Nozze di Figaro. During her time at the conservatory, she met and developed relationships with artists that she is still working with today, such as the founder of the French contemporary classical music group, Le Balcon, and the pianist Alphonse Cemin. In 2010, she graduated with honours.

== Career ==
As soon as she finished her studies, Fuchs made her professional career performing Galatea at the Aix-en-Provence Festival.

In 2013, Fuchs joined the opera ensemble at the Zürich Opera where she debuted several roles, including Marzelline in Fidelio, Morgana in Alcina, Susanna in Le nozze di Figaro, and Angelica in Orlando.

In 2014, Fuchs signed a recording contract with Deutsche Grammophon; she released her first album Yes! the following year, which paid homage to French repertoire in the 1930s and 1940s.

Also in 2015, Fuchs made her debut at the Opéra national de Paris in the role of la Folie in Platée by Rameau. She also made her debut in the Rossini repertoire as the Comtesse Folleville at the Zürich Opera, and sang in the televised concert in celebration of Bastille Day in Paris, under the Eiffel Tower. At the Salzburg Festival that same year, she made her festival debut singing the soprano part in Mozart's Great Mass in C Minor.

2016 marked her debut at the Bavarian State Opera in Munich as Musetta in La bohème. she sang with the BBC Symphony Orchestra at the BBC Proms, and she made her debut at the Chorégies d'Orange, the celebrated festival in the South of France. Her year of debuts continued in Vienna, where she was praised by the press for her debut as Marie in Donizetti's La fille du régiment.

In 2017, Fuchs returned to the Opéra national de Paris, creating the role of Esther for the premiere of the opera Trompe-la-mort de Lucas Francesconi, and to sing the role of Nannetta in Verdi's Falstaff. Other highlights included Leïla in Bizet's Les Pêcheurs de perles at the Auditorium du Nouveau Siècle in Lille and at the Théâtre des Champs-Elysées. She also returned to the Aix-en-Provence Festival as Zerlina in Don Giovanni. She also made her debut at the Teatro Real in Madrid as Giunia in Lucio Silla.

2018 began with the role of Comtesse Adèle in Le comte Ory, at the Opéra Royal de Versailles, followed by Morgana in Alcina at the Théâtre des Champs-Elysées, and a role debut as Poppea in L'incoronazione di Poppea at Opernhaus Zürich. She ended her year as Eurydice in Orphée aux enfers at the Opéra d'Avignon.

In 2019, Fuchs returned to Opernhaus Zürich for her role debut as Donna Fiorilla in Il turco in Italia by Rossini and made her role debut as Eva in La mort d'Abel at the Salzburg Whitsun Festival. In the autumn, she made yet another role debut as Émilie/Fatime in Rameau's Les Indes galantes at the Opéra national de Paris in a highly acclaimed new production that included contemporary dancers. Her final role of the year was Norina in a new production of Don Pasquale at Opernhaus Zürich. The same year, she was also the center of a media firestorm regarding her firing from the Hamburg State Opera where she was scheduled to sing Pamina in Die Zauberflöte, due to her pregnancy. The coverage surrounding her brought to light the progress that still needs to be made regarding women's right in the opera world. She also released her second recording for Deutsche Grammophon, Mademoiselle, a collection of Bel Canto arias, some of which were recorded for the first time.

In 2020, Fuchs debuted in the role of Norina in Don Pasquale at Opernhaus Zürich.

In 2021, Fuchs made her debut as Pamina in Die Zauberflöte at L'Opéra national de Paris, and she made her house debut at Opera San Carlo as Fiorilla in Il Turco in Italia.

Julie's 2021/22 season began with a return to Opernhaus Zürich as the title role in L'incoronazione di Poppea. She then made her role debut as Mélisande in Pelléas et Mélisande at the Gran Teatre del Liceu, and reprised the role of Susanna in Le nozze di Figaro at the Teatro Real Madrid. In the summer she performed La Folie (Platée) at the Opéra national de Paris. To conclude her season she returned to the role of Adèle in Le Comte Ory as she made her debut at the Rossini Festival.

Julie commenced her 2022/23 season with a return to the Opera national de Paris for her role debut as Giulietta in Bellini's I Capuleti E I Montecchi. To begin the New Year, Julie made her role debut as Cleopatra in a new production of Handel's Giulio Cesare by Calixto Bieito at the Dutch National Opera, also marking her house debut. In July, she returned to both the title role in L'incoronazione di Poppea and the Gran Teatre del Liceu.

In 2022, Sony Classical announced the signing of Julie for a multi-record deal. Her first album for the label, Amadè, is dedicated entirely to Mozart and was released on 18 November 2022.

Her 2023/2024 began on the stage of Palais Garnier in Donizetti's Don Pasquale as Norina. She then made her role debut as Gilda in Rigoletto by Giuseppe Verdi at the Teatro Real in Madrid. In March 2023, she began a recital tour with pianist Alphonse Cemin with performances in Europe and beyond.

Julie started her 2024/25 season with a return to Opéra national de Paris and a return to the role of Marie in La fille du régiment. On 7 December 2024, she sang Mozart's Laudate Dominum at the reopening of Notre-Dame de Paris with the Orchestre philharmonique de Radio France, and the Maîtrise Notre Dame de Paris, conducted by Gustavo Dudamel, broadcast live on TV internationally. In December 2024 and January 2025, she performed the role of Juliette in Goundo's Roméo et Juliette at Opernhaus Zürich, in a production by Ted Huffman, in which she sang in the 2023/24 season.

== Other ==
Fuchs was a "marraine" of Tous à l'Opéra alongside Ruggero Raimondi in 2012. At the end of 2017, she sang Ave Maria by Franz Schubert at the televised funeral of Johnny Hallyday at the Madeleine Church in Paris.

Fuchs is particularly active on social media under the handle @juliefuchssoprano, and created the initiative #operaisopen, which seeks to prove that opera is open to everyone regardless of income, age, or education.

== Awards ==
  - Révélation classique de l'Adami (2009)
  - Finalist at the Paris Opera Competition (2010)
  - Prize winner, Palazzetto Bru Zane at the Concours de Paris (2010)
  - Gabriel Dussurget Prize, Aix-en-Provence Festival (2011)
  - Révélation lyrique, Victoires de la musique classique (2012)
  - Révélation musicale, le Syndicat professionnel de la critique de théâtre, musique et danse 2 (2012/2013)
  - Second prize, Operalia (2013)1
  - Artiste lyrique de l'année, Victoires de la musique classique (2014)
  - Artiste lyrique de l'année, Victoires de la musique classique (2021)
  - Chevalier des Arts et des Lettres (2021)

== Recordings ==
  - Mélodies de Jeunesse, including works by Gustav Mahler and Claude Debussy with pianist Alphonse Cemin, recorded for Aparté/Harmonia Mundi.
  - The complete Mélodies pour Piano et Voix by Francis Poulenc for the label Atma Classique.
  - Ciboulette, 2014, (DVD) Opéra de Hahn, Framusica
  - Yes!, 2015, répertoire français des années 30, Deutsche Grammophon,
  - l’Amour Masqué by Messager Elles et Barbara, 2017, femmes qui chantent' et offrent une relecture inédite des classiques de celle qui se définissait comme 'la femme qui chante' Mercury Music Group [archive]
  - l’Amour Masqué by Messager Les pêcheurs de perles, 2018, enregistrement live, Pentatone Music [archive]
  - Les pêcheurs de perles (The Pearl Fishers). Cyrille Dubois, Florian Sempey, Luc Bertin-Hugault, Alexandre Bloch, Orchestre National de Lille, Les Cris de Paris. PENTATONE PTC 5186685 (2018).
  - Le Comte Ory, DVD, 2019 Unitel
  - Mademoiselle. 2019, Bel Canto repertoire, Deutsche Grammophon
  - Amadè, 2022, Mozart repertoire, Sony Classical
  - Platée, 2024, DVD, Bel Air Classiques
