= Yeah =

Yeah may refer to:

- Yeah is a synonym of yes; see yes and no

== Music ==
=== Albums ===
- Yeah!!!, by Aretha Franklin in 1965
- Yeah! (Brownsville Station album), 1973
- Yeah! (Charlie Rouse album), 1961
- Yeah! (Def Leppard album), 2006
- Yeah (Park Jung-ah album), 2006
- Yeah (The Wannadies album), 1999
- Yeah!, KMFDM EP, 2017

=== Songs ===
- "Yeah" (Joe Nichols song), 2014
- "Yeah" (LCD Soundsystem song), 2004
- "Yeah!" (Paul Brandt song), 1998
- "Yeah!" (Usher song), 2004
- "Yeah 3x", by Chris Brown, 2010
- "Yeah", by Apink from Snow Pink, 2011
- "Yeah", by Charli xcx from Music, Fashion, Film, 2026
- "Yeah", by DJ Krush from Strictly Turntablized, 1994
- "Yeah!", by Does It Offend You Yeah? from Don't Say We Didn't Warn You, 2011
- "Yeah", by Kelly Clarkson from My December, 2007
- "Yeah", by Kyuss from Blues for the Red Sun, 1992
- "Yeah", by Queen from Made in Heaven, 1995
- "Yeah", by Royce da 5'9" from Independent's Day, 2005
- "Yeah", by Seether from Holding Onto Strings Better Left to Fray, 2011
- "Yeah", by Yolanda Adams from Mountain High... Valley Low, 1999
- "Yeah!", by Zwan from Mary Star of the Sea, 2003

== See also ==
- Young European Alliance for Hope, the youth wing of the European Alliance for Freedom; see Vlaams Belang Jongeren
- YeAH-TCP, a TCP congestion-avoidance algorithm in computing
- Yeah Yeah (disambiguation)
- Yeah Yeah Yeah (disambiguation)
- Yeah! Woo!, a frequently sampled phrase by James Brown
- Yea (disambiguation)
- Yes (disambiguation)
