= Ya (Javanese) =

ya
- ꦪ
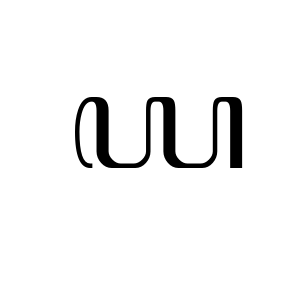
- Aksara nglegena

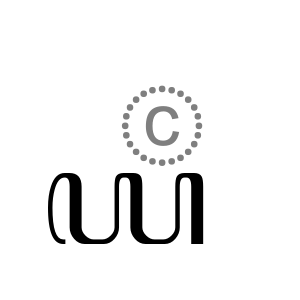
- Aksara pasangan

Usage
- Writing system: Javanese script
- Latin orthography: ya
- Sound values: [j]
- In Unicode: A9AA

ꦪ is one syllable in Javanese script that represents the sound /jɔ/, /ja/. It is transliterated to Latin as "ya", and sometimes in Indonesian orthography as "yo". It has another form (pasangan), which is ◌꧀ꦪ, but represented by a single Unicode code point, U+A9AA.

== Pasangan ==
Its pasangan form ◌꧀ꦪ, is located on the bottom side of the previous syllable. The pasangan only occurs if a word ends with a consonant, and the next word starts with 'y', for example ꦲꦤꦏ꧀ꦪꦸꦪꦸ - anak yuyu (little crab). If it is located between a consonant and a vocal, it doesn't form a pasangan. Instead it uses a special panjingan called a pengkal (ꦾ), for example ꦲꦩ꧀ꦥꦾꦁ - ampyang (a kind of snack).

== Murda ==
The letter ꦪ does not have a murda form.

== Glyphs ==
Nglegena forms				Pasangan forms			
ꦪ ya	ꦪꦃ yah	ꦪꦁ yang	ꦪꦂ yar	◌꧀ꦪ -ya	◌꧀ꦪꦃ -yah	◌꧀ꦪꦁ -yang	◌꧀ꦪꦂ -yar
ꦪꦺ ye	ꦪꦺꦃ yeh	ꦪꦺꦁ yeng	ꦪꦺꦂ yer	◌꧀ꦪꦺ -ye	◌꧀ꦪꦺꦃ -yeh	◌꧀ꦪꦺꦁ -yeng	◌꧀ꦪꦺꦂ -yer
ꦪꦼ yê	ꦪꦼꦃ yêh	ꦪꦼꦁ yêng	ꦪꦼꦂ yêr	◌꧀ꦪꦼ -yê	◌꧀ꦪꦼꦃ -yêh	◌꧀ꦪꦼꦁ -yêng	◌꧀ꦪꦼꦂ -yêr
ꦪꦶ yi	ꦪꦶꦃ yih	ꦪꦶꦁ ying	ꦪꦶꦂ yir	◌꧀ꦪꦶ -yi	◌꧀ꦪꦶꦃ -yih	◌꧀ꦪꦶꦁ -ying	◌꧀ꦪꦶꦂ -yir
ꦪꦺꦴ yo	ꦪꦺꦴꦃ yoh	ꦪꦺꦴꦁ yong	ꦪꦺꦴꦂ yor	◌꧀ꦪꦺꦴ -yo	◌꧀ꦪꦺꦴꦃ -yoh	◌꧀ꦪꦺꦴꦁ -yong	◌꧀ꦪꦺꦴꦂ -yor
ꦪꦸ yu	ꦪꦸꦃ yuh	ꦪꦸꦁ yung	ꦪꦸꦂ yur	◌꧀ꦪꦸ -yu	◌꧀ꦪꦸꦃ -yuh	◌꧀ꦪꦸꦁ -yung	◌꧀ꦪꦸꦂ -yur
ꦪꦿ yra	ꦪꦿꦃ yrah	ꦪꦿꦁ yrang	ꦪꦿꦂ yrar	◌꧀ꦪꦿ -yra	◌꧀ꦪꦿꦃ -yrah	◌꧀ꦪꦿꦁ -yrang	◌꧀ꦪꦿꦂ -yrar
ꦪꦿꦺ yre	ꦪꦿꦺꦃ yreh	ꦪꦿꦺꦁ yreng	ꦪꦿꦺꦂ yrer	◌꧀ꦪꦿꦺ -yre	◌꧀ꦪꦿꦺꦃ -yreh	◌꧀ꦪꦿꦺꦁ -yreng	◌꧀ꦪꦿꦺꦂ -yrer
ꦪꦽ yrê	ꦪꦽꦃ yrêh	ꦪꦽꦁ yrêng	ꦪꦽꦂ yrêr	◌꧀ꦪꦽ -yrê	◌꧀ꦪꦽꦃ -yrêh	◌꧀ꦪꦽꦁ -yrêng	◌꧀ꦪꦽꦂ -yrêr
ꦪꦿꦶ yri	ꦪꦿꦶꦃ yrih	ꦪꦿꦶꦁ yring	ꦪꦿꦶꦂ yrir	◌꧀ꦪꦿꦶ -yri	◌꧀ꦪꦿꦶꦃ -yrih	◌꧀ꦪꦿꦶꦁ -yring	◌꧀ꦪꦿꦶꦂ -yrir
ꦪꦿꦺꦴ yro	ꦪꦿꦺꦴꦃ yroh	ꦪꦿꦺꦴꦁ yrong	ꦪꦿꦺꦴꦂ yror	◌꧀ꦪꦿꦺꦴ -yro	◌꧀ꦪꦿꦺꦴꦃ -yroh	◌꧀ꦪꦿꦺꦴꦁ -yrong	◌꧀ꦪꦿꦺꦴꦂ -yror
ꦪꦿꦸ yru	ꦪꦿꦸꦃ yruh	ꦪꦿꦸꦁ yrung	ꦪꦿꦸꦂ yrur	◌꧀ꦪꦿꦸ -yru	◌꧀ꦪꦿꦸꦃ -yruh	◌꧀ꦪꦿꦸꦁ -yrung	◌꧀ꦪꦿꦸꦂ -yrur
ꦪꦾ yya	ꦪꦾꦃ yyah	ꦪꦾꦁ yyang	ꦪꦾꦂ yyar	◌꧀ꦪꦾ -yya	◌꧀ꦪꦾꦃ -yyah	◌꧀ꦪꦾꦁ -yyang	◌꧀ꦪꦾꦂ -yyar
ꦪꦾꦺ yye	ꦪꦾꦺꦃ yyeh	ꦪꦾꦺꦁ yyeng	ꦪꦾꦺꦂ yyer	◌꧀ꦪꦾꦺ -yye	◌꧀ꦪꦾꦺꦃ -yyeh	◌꧀ꦪꦾꦺꦁ -yyeng	◌꧀ꦪꦾꦺꦂ -yyer
ꦪꦾꦼ yyê	ꦪꦾꦼꦃ yyêh	ꦪꦾꦼꦁ yyêng	ꦪꦾꦼꦂ yyêr	◌꧀ꦪꦾꦼ -yyê	◌꧀ꦪꦾꦼꦃ -yyêh	◌꧀ꦪꦾꦼꦁ -yyêng	◌꧀ꦪꦾꦼꦂ -yyêr
ꦪꦾꦶ yyi	ꦪꦾꦶꦃ yyih	ꦪꦾꦶꦁ yying	ꦪꦾꦶꦂ yyir	◌꧀ꦪꦾꦶ -yyi	◌꧀ꦪꦾꦶꦃ -yyih	◌꧀ꦪꦾꦶꦁ -yying	◌꧀ꦪꦾꦶꦂ -yyir
ꦪꦾꦺꦴ yyo	ꦪꦾꦺꦴꦃ yyoh	ꦪꦾꦺꦴꦁ yyong	ꦪꦾꦺꦴꦂ yyor	◌꧀ꦪꦾꦺꦴ -yyo	◌꧀ꦪꦾꦺꦴꦃ -yyoh	◌꧀ꦪꦾꦺꦴꦁ -yyong	◌꧀ꦪꦾꦺꦴꦂ -yyor
ꦪꦾꦸ yyu	ꦪꦾꦸꦃ yyuh	ꦪꦾꦸꦁ yyung	ꦪꦾꦸꦂ yyur	◌꧀ꦪꦾꦸ -yyu	◌꧀ꦪꦾꦸꦃ -yyuh	◌꧀ꦪꦾꦸꦁ -yyung	◌꧀ꦪꦾꦸꦂ -yyur

== Unicode block ==
Javanese script was added to the Unicode Standard in October, 2009 with the release of version 5.2.

Javanese^{[1]}^{[2]} Official Unicode Consortium code chart (PDF)
	0	1	2	3	4	5	6	7	8	9	A	B	C	D	E	F
U+A98x	ꦀ	ꦁ	ꦂ	ꦃ	ꦄ	ꦅ	ꦆ	ꦇ	ꦈ	ꦉ	ꦊ	ꦋ	ꦌ	ꦍ	ꦎ	ꦏ
U+A99x	ꦐ	ꦑ	ꦒ	ꦓ	ꦔ	ꦕ	ꦖ	ꦗ	ꦘ	ꦙ	ꦚ	ꦛ	ꦜ	ꦝ	ꦞ	ꦟ
U+A9Ax	ꦠ	ꦡ	ꦢ	ꦣ	ꦤ	ꦥ	ꦦ	ꦧ	ꦨ	ꦩ	ꦪ	ꦫ	ꦬ	ꦭ	ꦮ	ꦯ
U+A9Bx	ꦰ	ꦱ	ꦲ	꦳	ꦴ	ꦵ	ꦶ	ꦷ	ꦸ	ꦹ	ꦺ	ꦻ	ꦼ	ꦽ	ꦾ	ꦿ
U+A9Cx	꧀	꧁	꧂	꧃	꧄	꧅	꧆	꧇	꧈	꧉	꧊	꧋	꧌	꧍		ꧏ
U+A9Dx	꧐	꧑	꧒	꧓	꧔	꧕	꧖	꧗	꧘	꧙					꧞	꧟
Notes 1.As of Unicode version 17.0 2.Grey areas indicate non-assigned code points
