= Spire of Notre-Dame de Paris =

Architectural feature of Notre-Dame de Paris

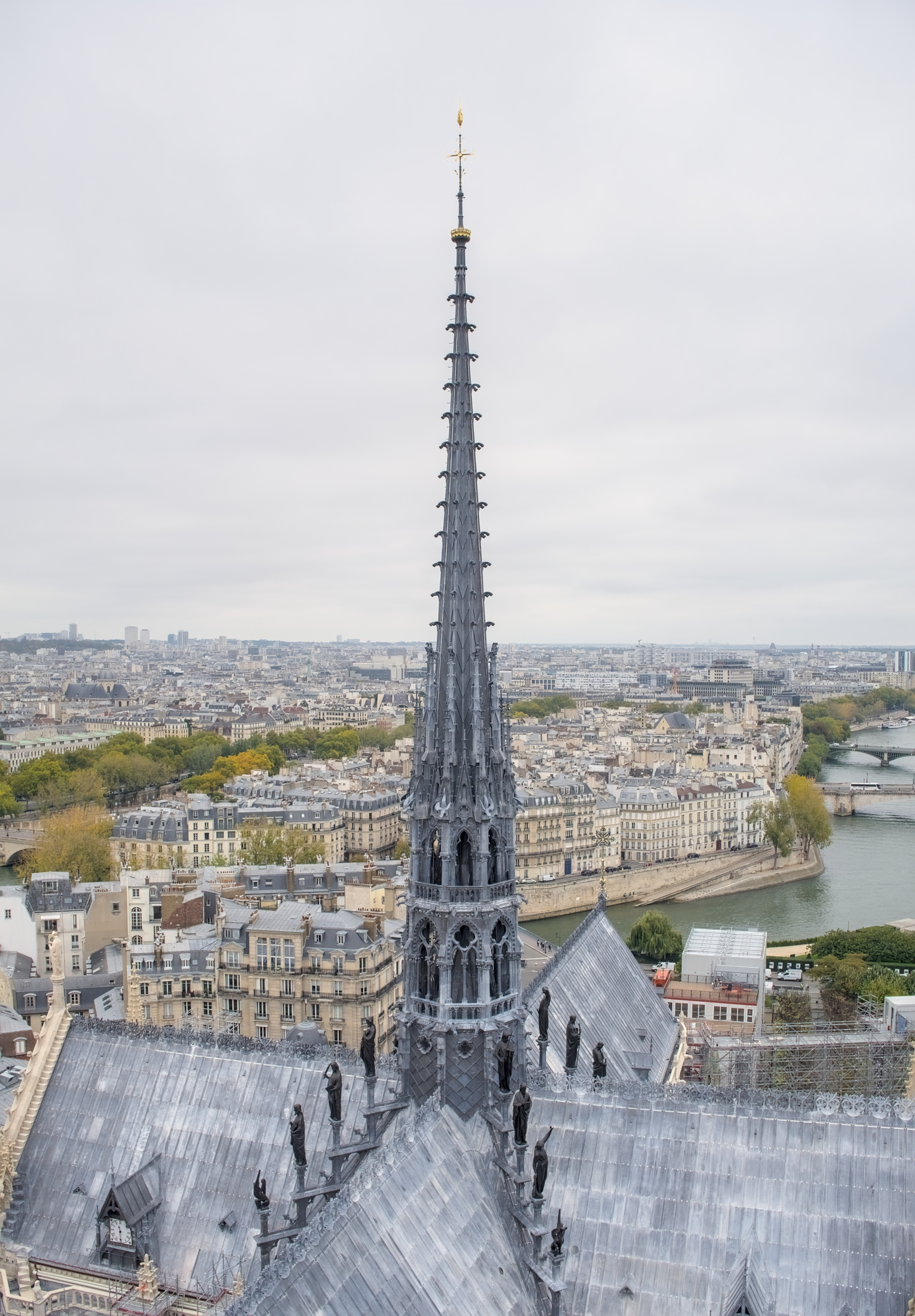
- The third spire in 2025
- Interactive map of Spire of Notre-Dame de Paris
- Location: Notre-Dame de Paris, 4th arrondissement, Paris, France
- Coordinates: 48°51′11″N 2°21′00″E
- Designer: Viollet-le-Duc (Second and Third)
- Type: Spire
- Material: Lead and Oak
- Height: 78 metres (256 ft) (First) 96 metres (315 ft) (Second and Third)
- Beginning date: c. 1220
- Completion date: c. 1230
- Inauguration date: c. 1230
- Restored date: 18 June 1859, 16 December 2023

The Spire of Notre-Dame de Paris is located above the cross-section of the cathedral's transept. Notre-Dame de Paris has had three timber spires made of oak, known as flèches. The first was built between 1220 and 1230. It eventually became so damaged that it was removed in the late 18th century. The second was put into place by the French architect Eugène Viollet-le-Duc in 1859, and destroyed in a major fire on 15 April 2019. Work to construct a third one started in 2022, and was completed when the new copper rooster wind vane was placed on top of the new spire on 16 December 2023, and the third spire was unveiled on 13 February 2024.

== History ==
=== The original spire ===
The original spire was built from 1220 to 1230. It was supported by an "ingenious" and "well designed" system of frames, according to an examination of its remains after it was taken down. All of the spire's weight rested on the four pillars of the transept. This spire also functioned as a bell tower. It was 78 metres (256 ft) from the floor of the Church to the point of the Spire.

In March 1606, the large cross at the top of the spire and the relics that were inside it fell due to wind and decay. The rest of the spire began to collapse due to the ravages of time in the middle of the 18th century, and it was taken down from 1786 to 1792.

The Cathedral with its original spire
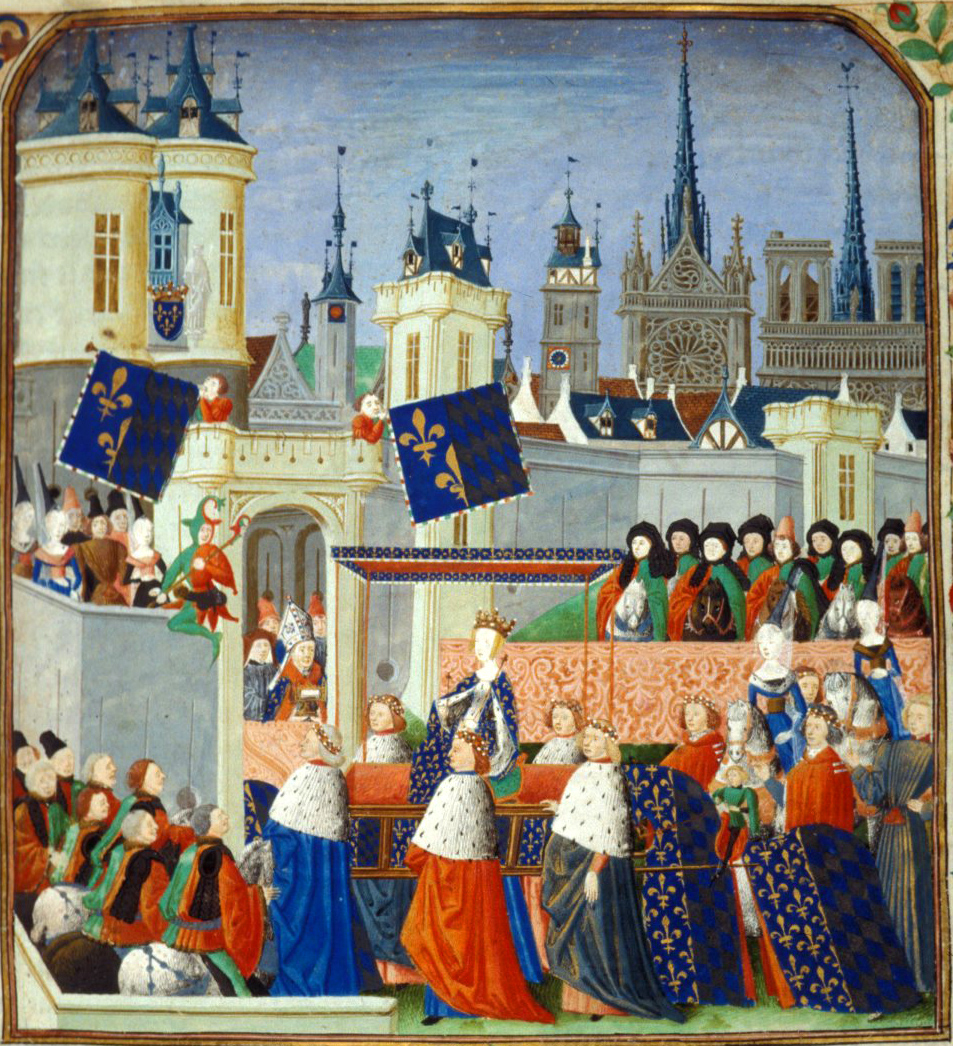
The entry of Isabella of Bavaria into Paris, from a miniature in Froissart's Chronicles, attributed to Philip of Mazerolles (c. 1470-1472)

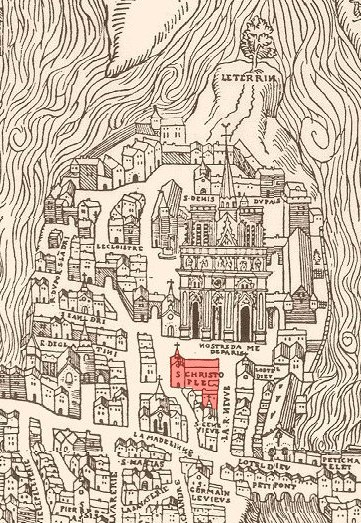
The cathedral represented on a map of Paris in 1553

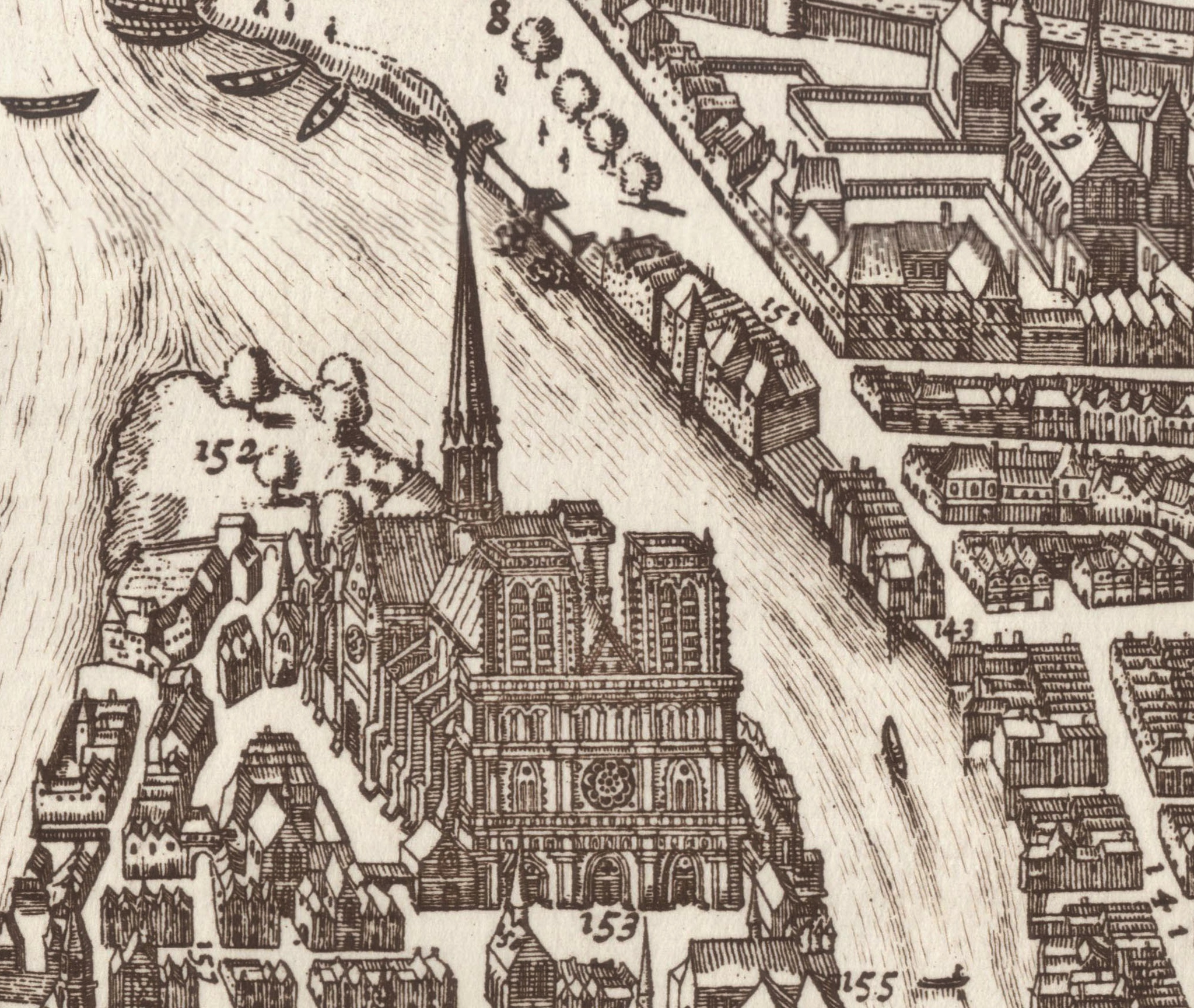
The cathedral on Claes Jansz Visscher's map of Paris in 1618

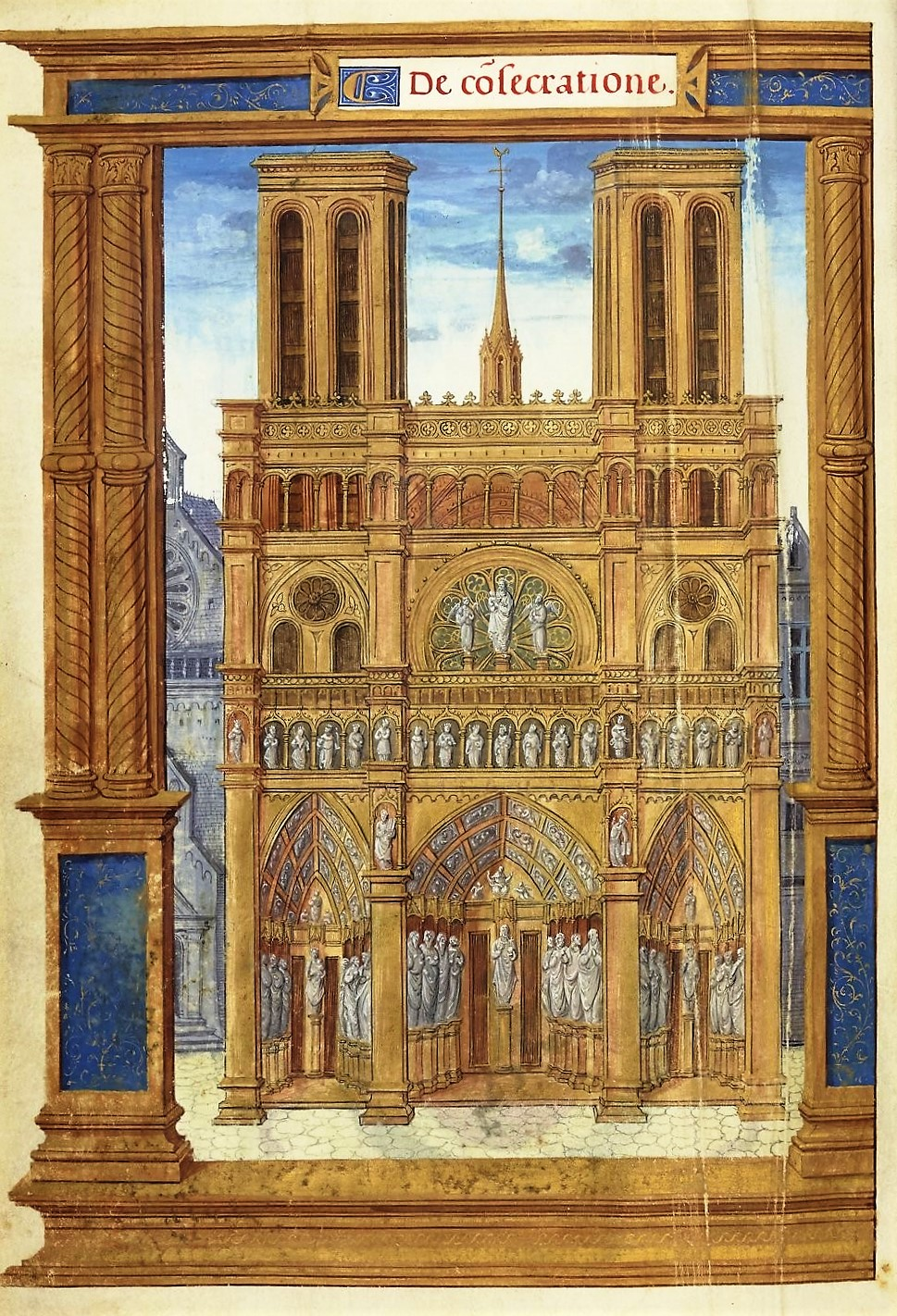
The cathedral in the Pontifical Romain by Jean de Mauléon Bishop of Comminges (c. 1525-1530)

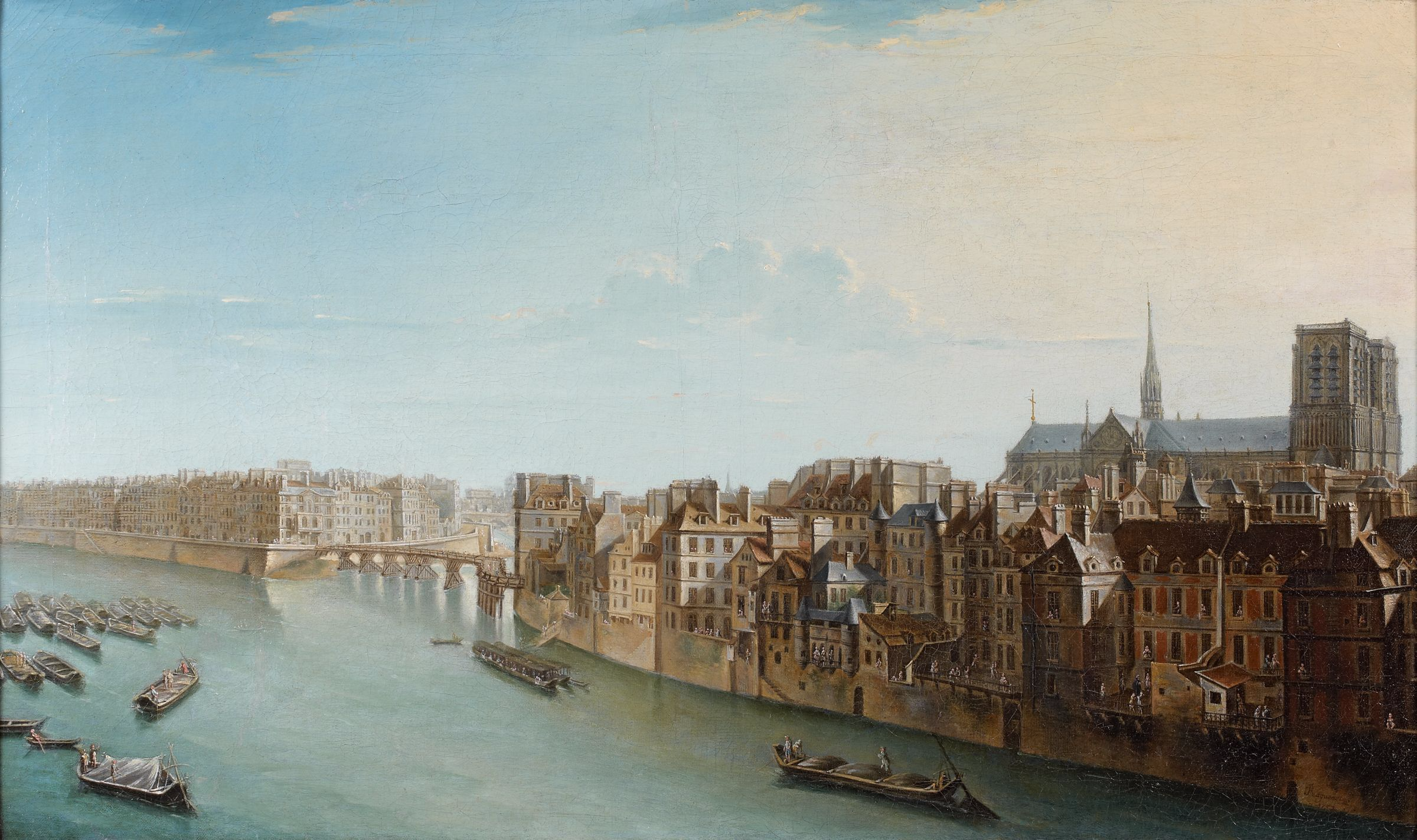
View of the île de la Cité featuring the Notre-Dame cathedral, by Nicolas-Jean-Baptiste Raguenet (1752)

=== The second spire ===
The cathedral remained without a spire for several decades until a restoration effort was begun by Jean-Baptiste Antoine Lassus. After Lassus's death in 1857, the project was taken over by Eugène Viollet-le-Duc. The new spire's design was inspired by that of the Orléans Cathedral (which was in turn modeled on the spire of the Amiens Cathedral). The wooden base of the structure was made by the carpenter Auguste Bellu (who had also worked on the Orléans Cathedral), and the lead covering was made by the Ateliers Monduit.

The spire was unveiled 18 August 1859. Its lead covering weighed some 250 tons. Its wooden structure was carved from oak from Champagne. The new spire reached a height of 96 metres (315 ft), which was 18 metres (59 ft) more than the original.

The second spire
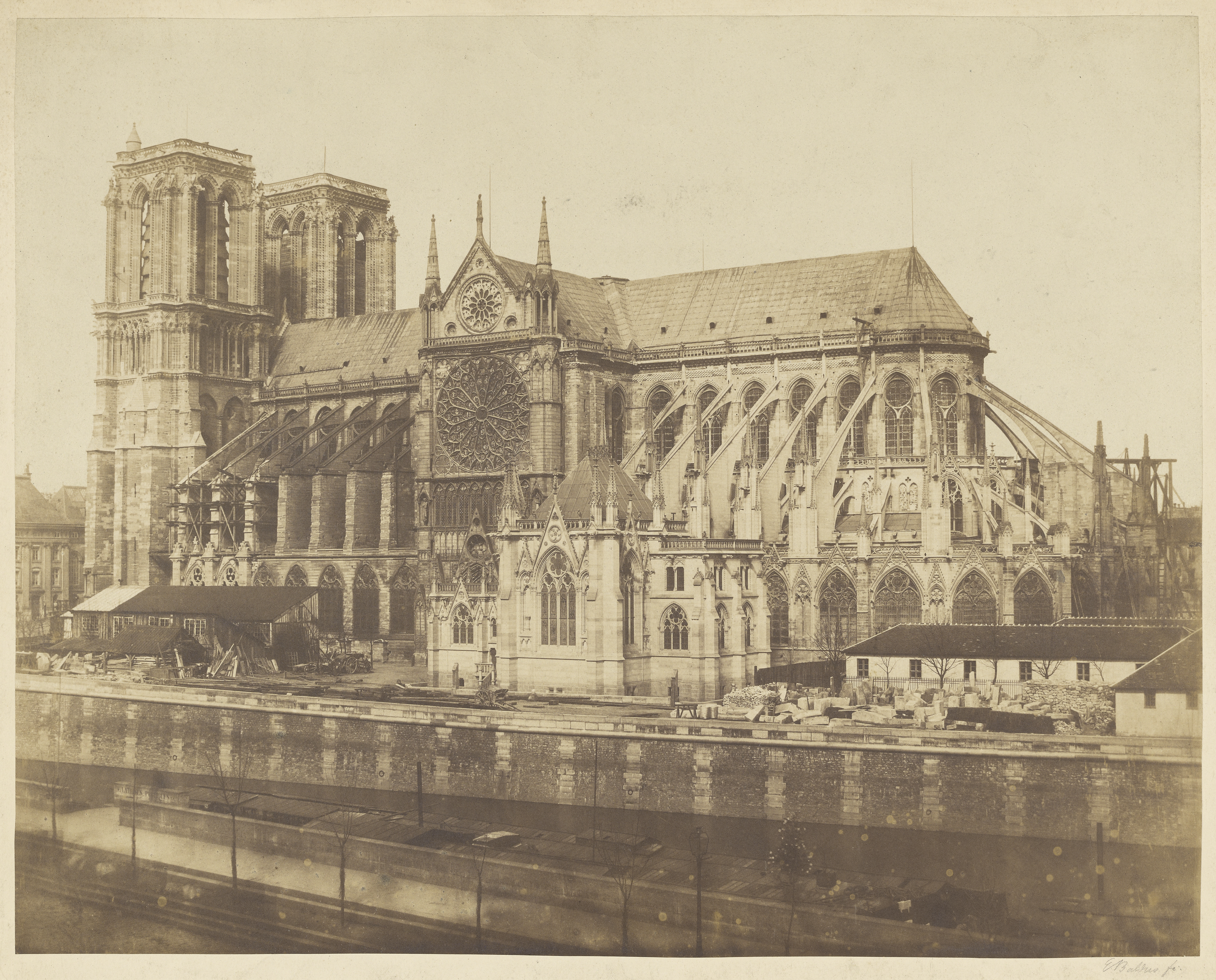
Notre-Dame without its spire in the 1850s (Édouard Baldus)

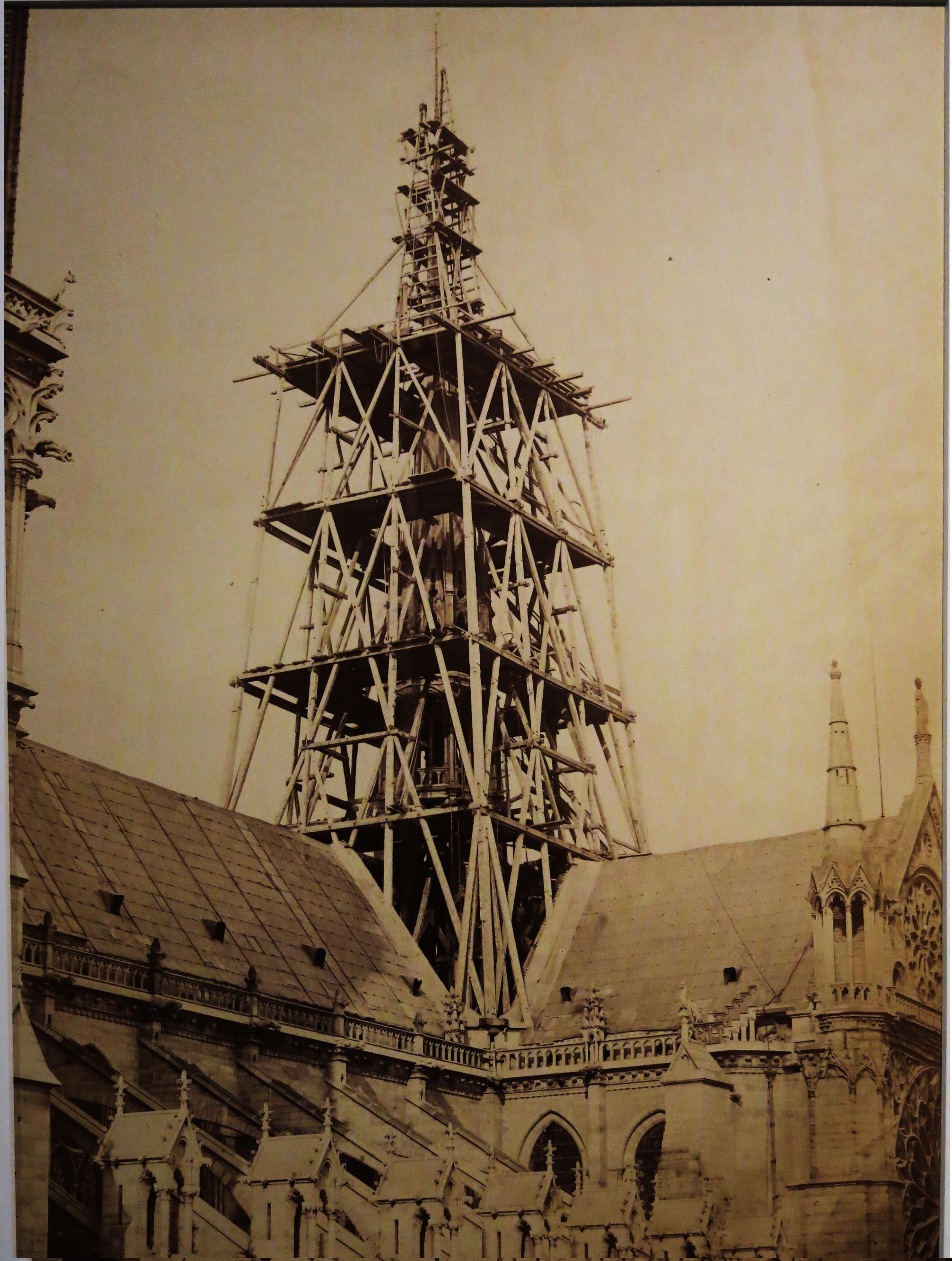
Construction of the spire around 1853

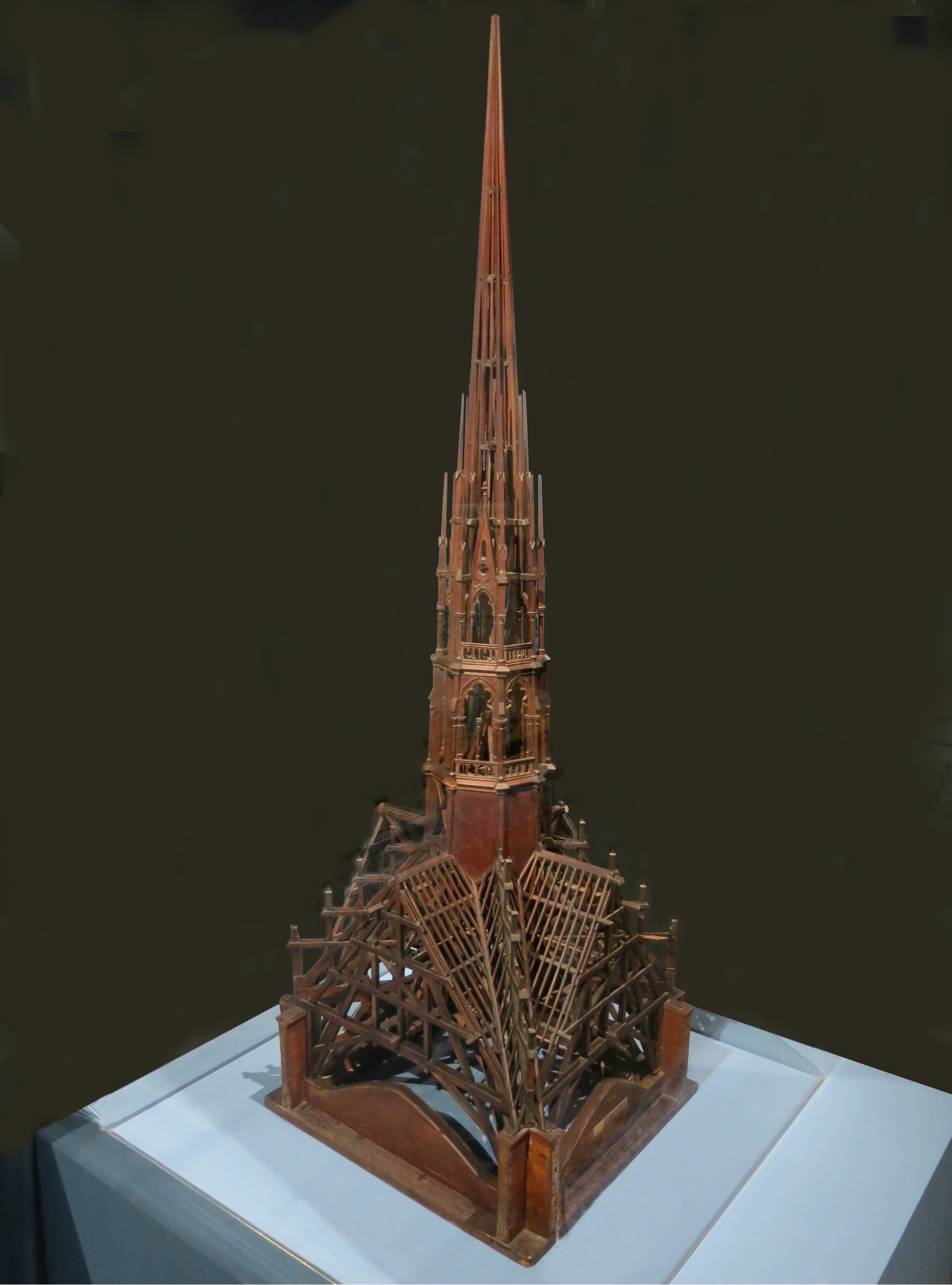
A model showing the wooden framework of the spire

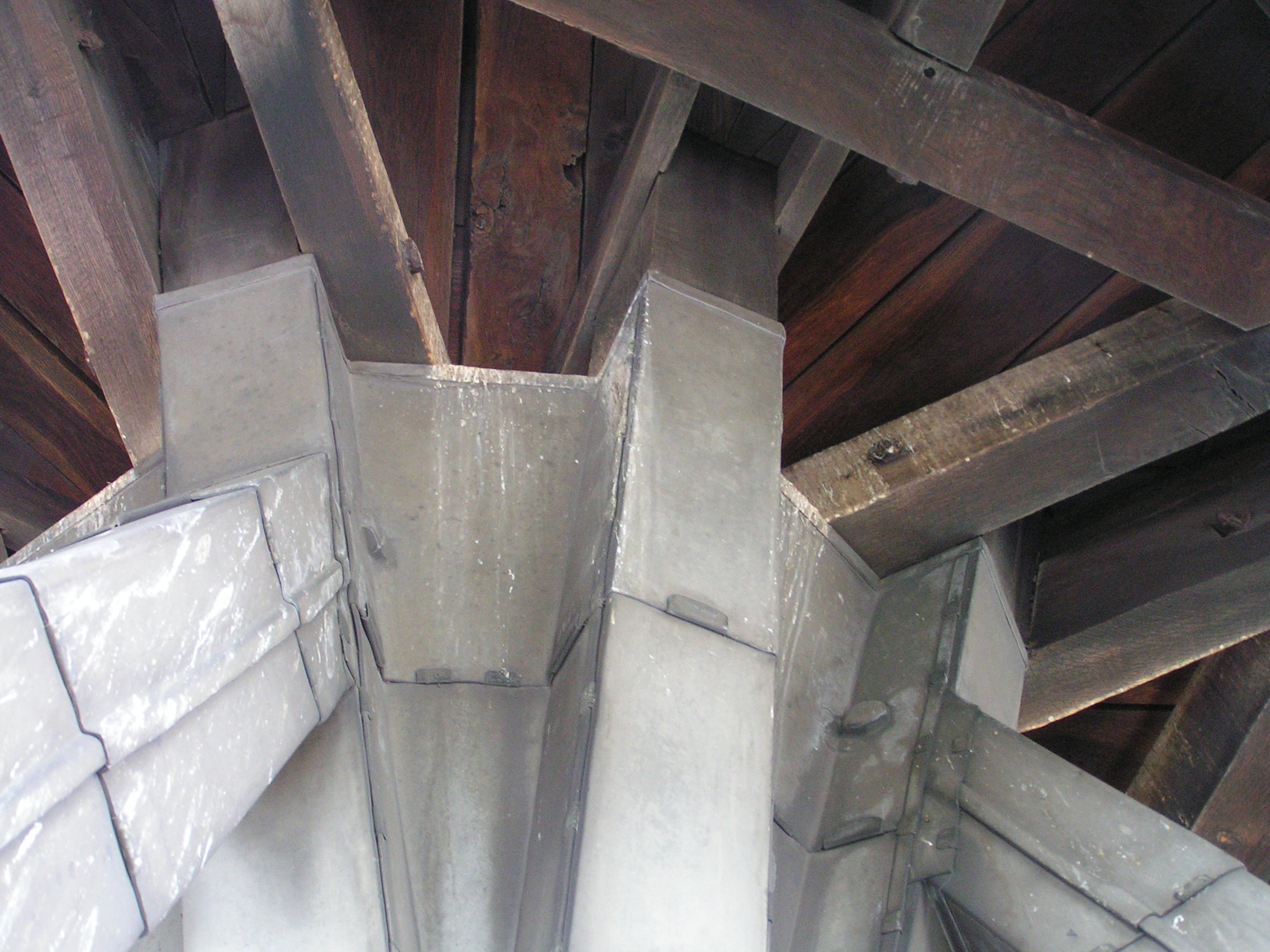
In the real spire, the wood was sheathed in lead to shed rain.

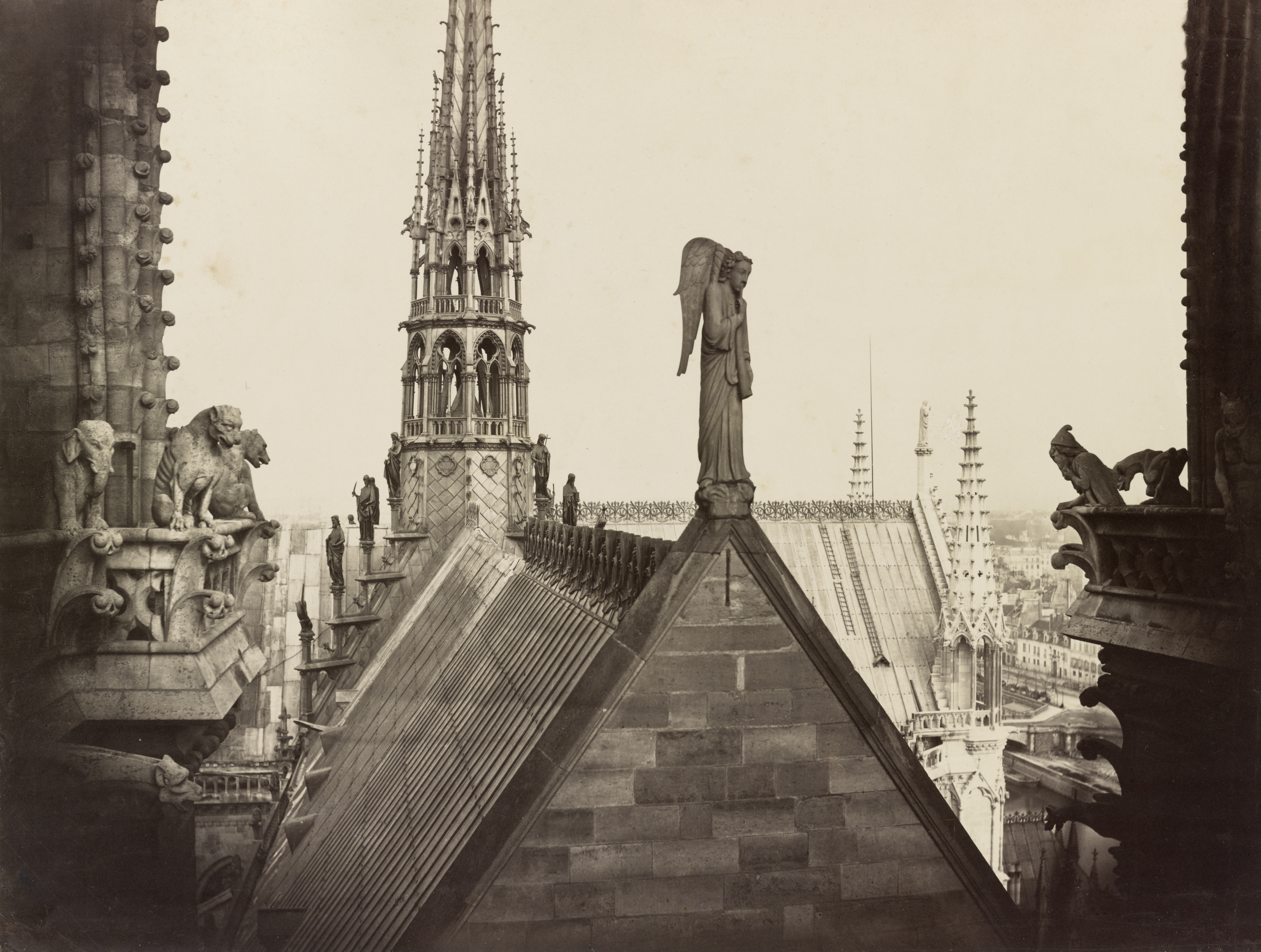
The roofs of Notre-Dame around 1860 (Charles Marville)

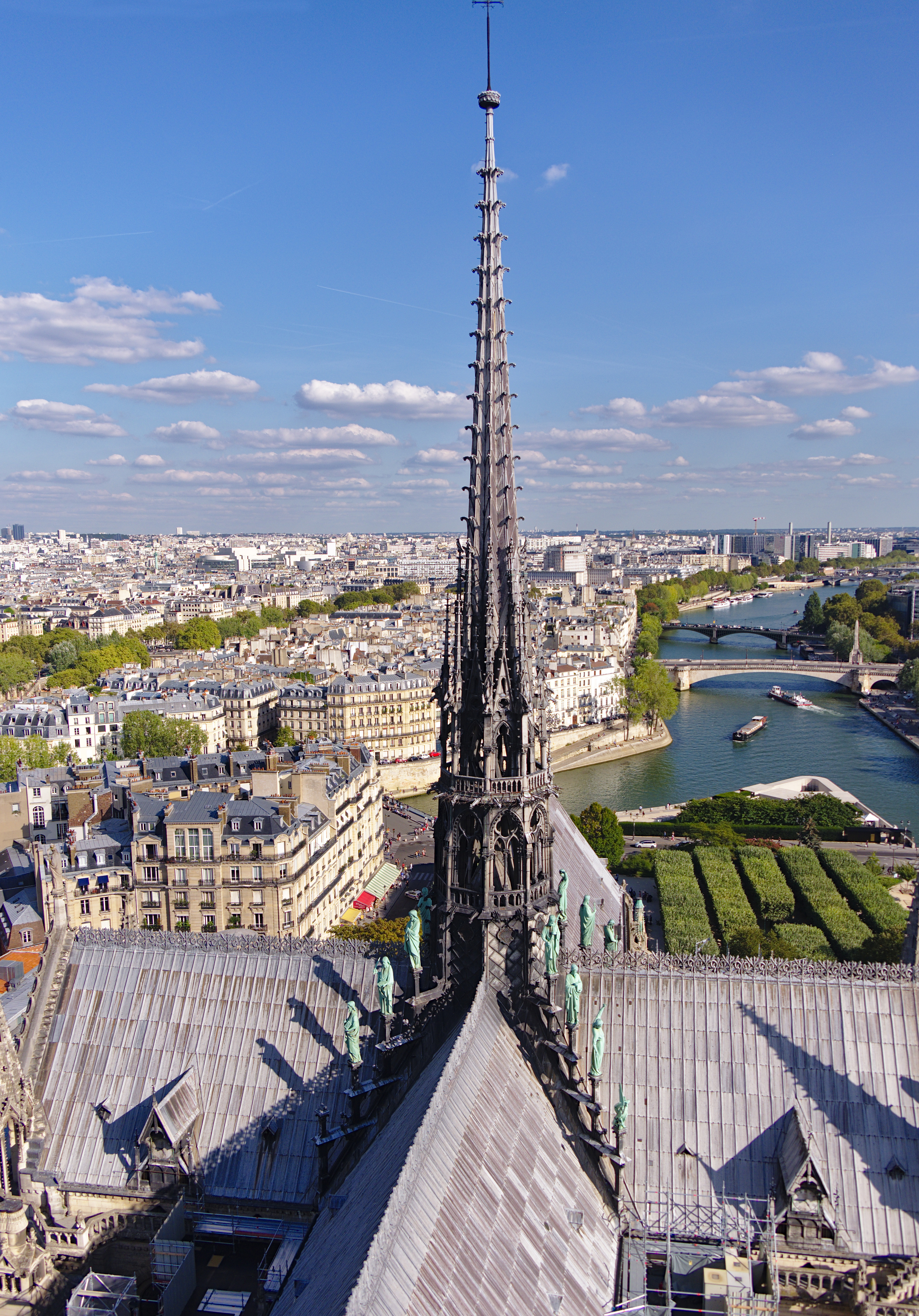
The spire in 2018, over the cathedral and the Île de la Cité, Notre-Dame's island

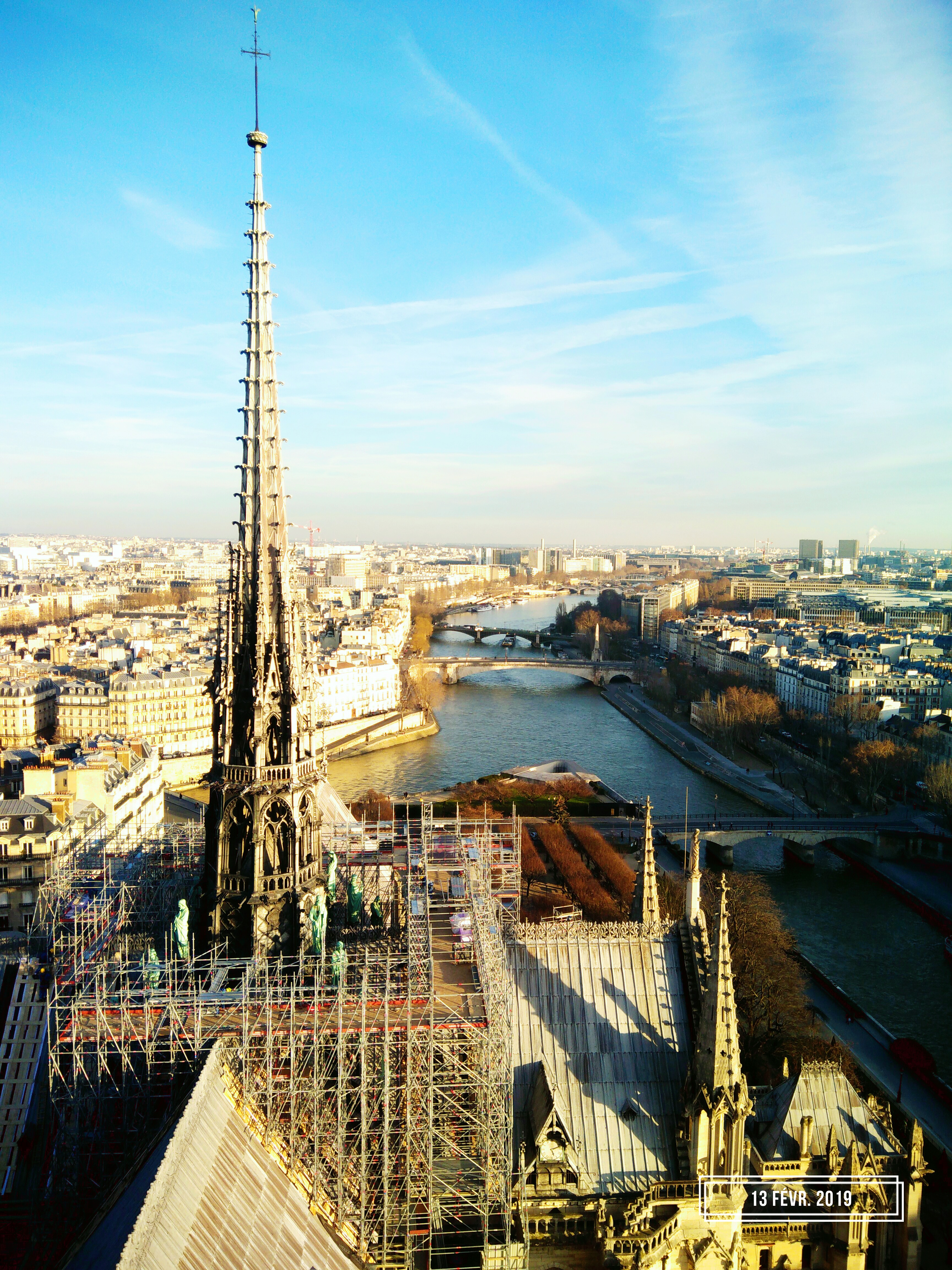
The spire surrounded by renovation scaffolding in 2019

Statues of the Twelve Apostles, made in the style of the 13th century, surrounded the spire at its base. Each of the four sections of the roof had a row of three apostles, standing one behind the other and staggered by height. In front of each group was another statue of a sign of the Tetramorph symbolizing the Four Evangelists: the bull for St. Luke, the lion for St. Mark, the eagle for St. John and the angel for St. Matthew. Each grouping faced one of the four cardinal directions. All of the statues look out over Paris except for St. Thomas, the patron saint of architects. He was looking towards the spire as if contemplating it. Viollet-le-Duc was the model for the statue of St. Thomas. At the base of the central support beam of the spire, an iron plaque dedicated to the achievement of the workers was inscribed with the image of a compass (drawing tool) and a try square. These were the symbols of the mason's guild and a subtle reference to God's role as Great Architect of the Universe in Catholic tradition. As both Viollet-le-Duc and Bellu are both mentioned by name on the plaque, it has been theorized that they were Freemasons.

Statues of the Twelve Apostles at the base of the spire
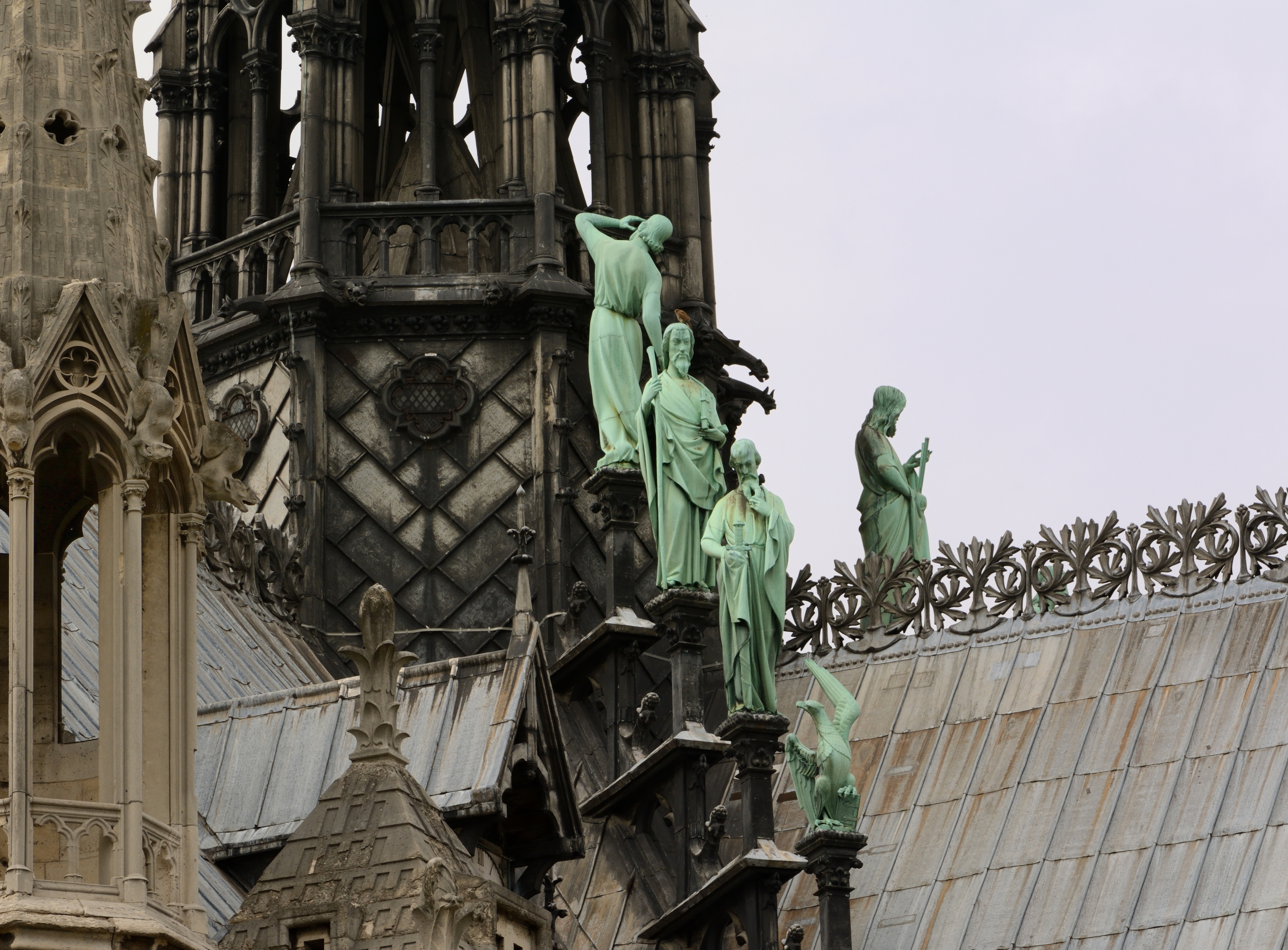
Three apostles with St. John's eagle in the foreground. St. Thomas has his back turned, as he inspects the spire.

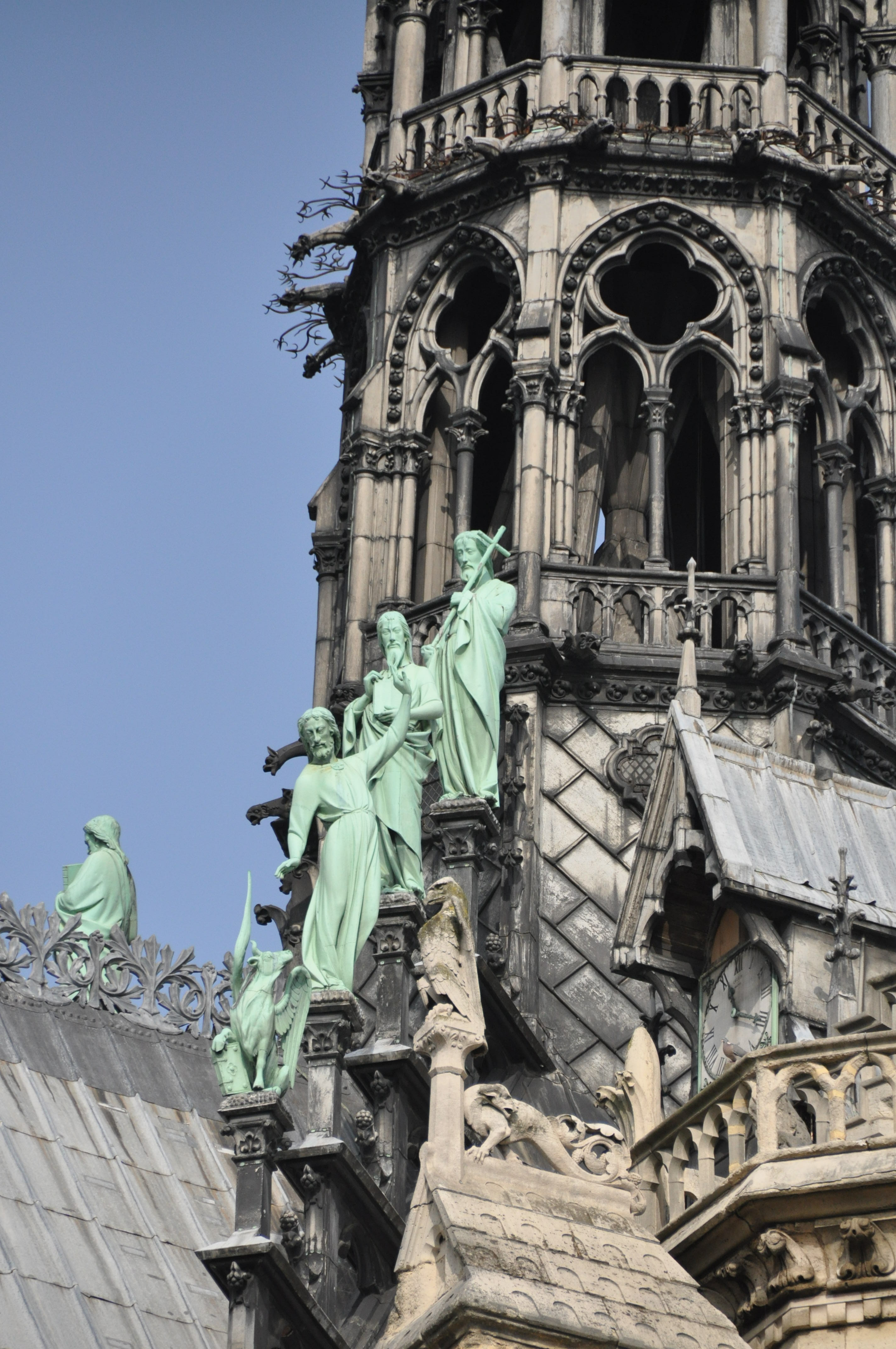
Three apostles with St. Luke's bull in the foreground

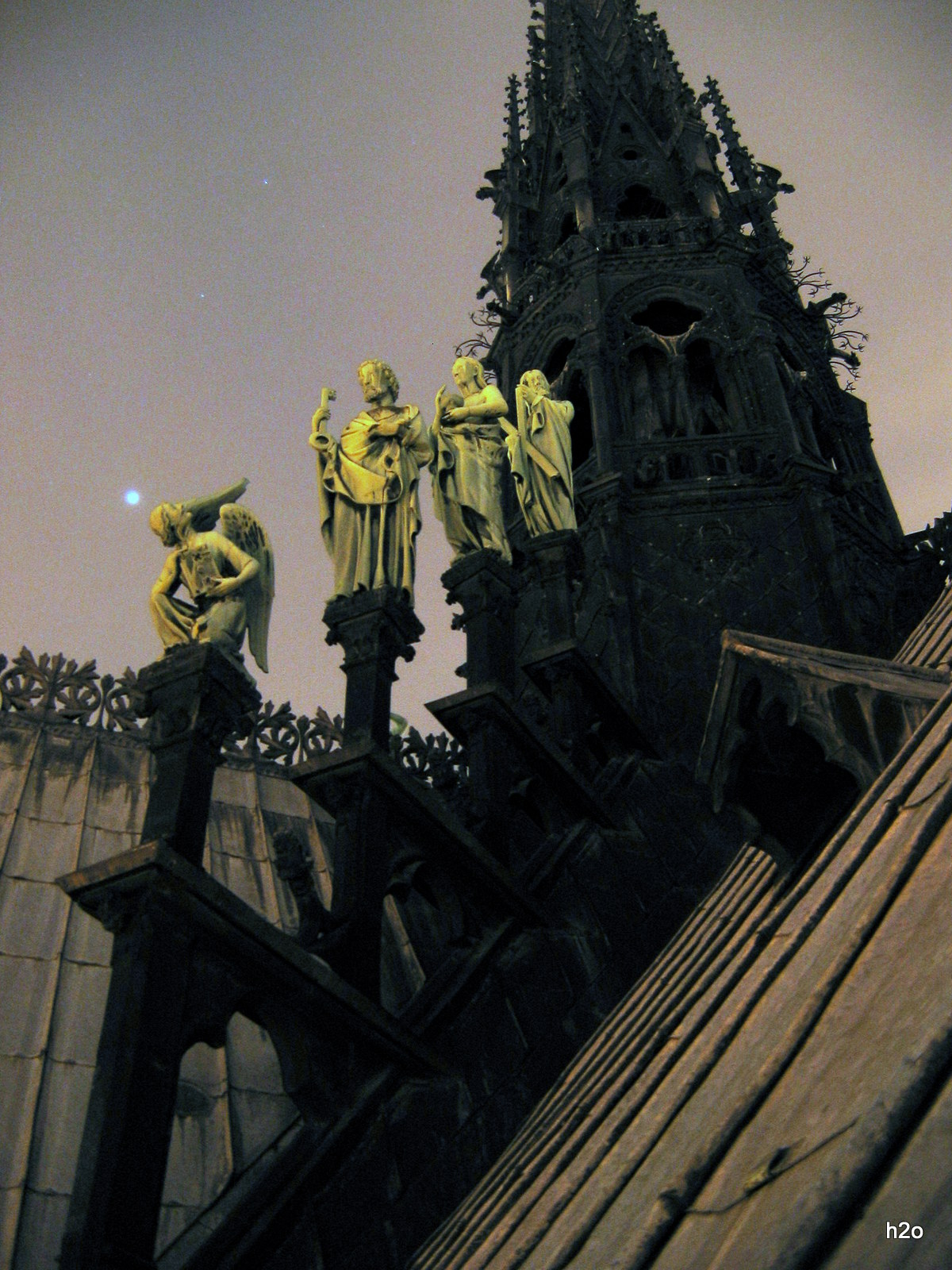
Three apostles with St. Matthew's angel in the foreground

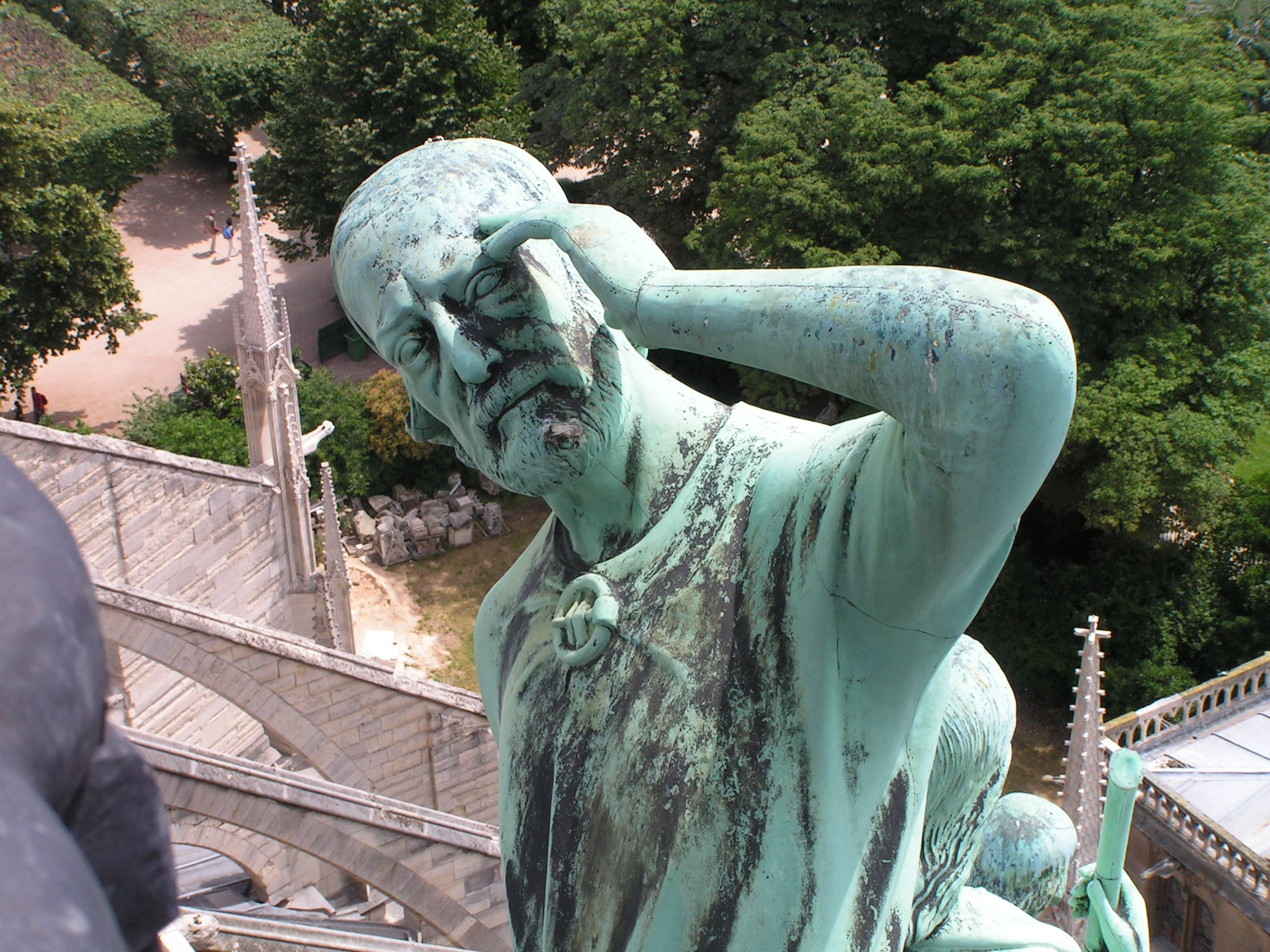
St. Thomas, modelled after Viollet-le-Duc, facing the Spire

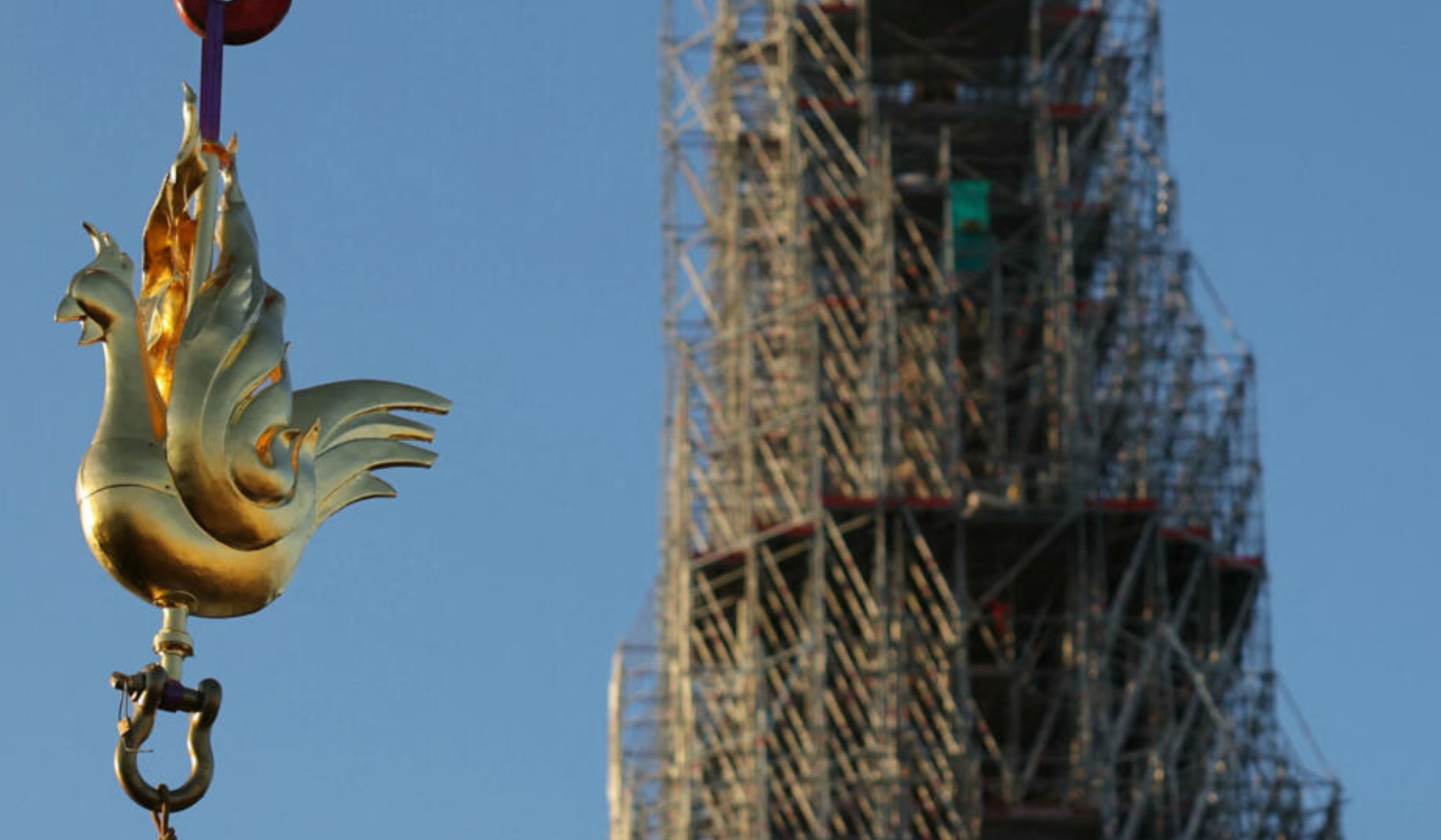
The new rooster (wind vane) being carried onto the third spire (in the background)

The rooster at the top of the spire weighed around 30 kilograms (66 lb). It contained three relics: a small piece of the crown of thorns, a relic of St. Denis, and a relic of St. Geneviève. The piece of the crown of thorns was put into the rooster by Viollet-le-Duc himself in 1860.

==== Destruction by fire ====
An operation to restore the spire began on 11 April 2019, as part of a larger restoration of the cathedral which would last ten years and cost an estimated 60 million euros. The sixteen statues were removed with an 80-metre (260 ft) tall crane and transported in pairs to a workshop to be restored. While one pair was being worked on the other fourteen statues would still be on display within the cathedral.

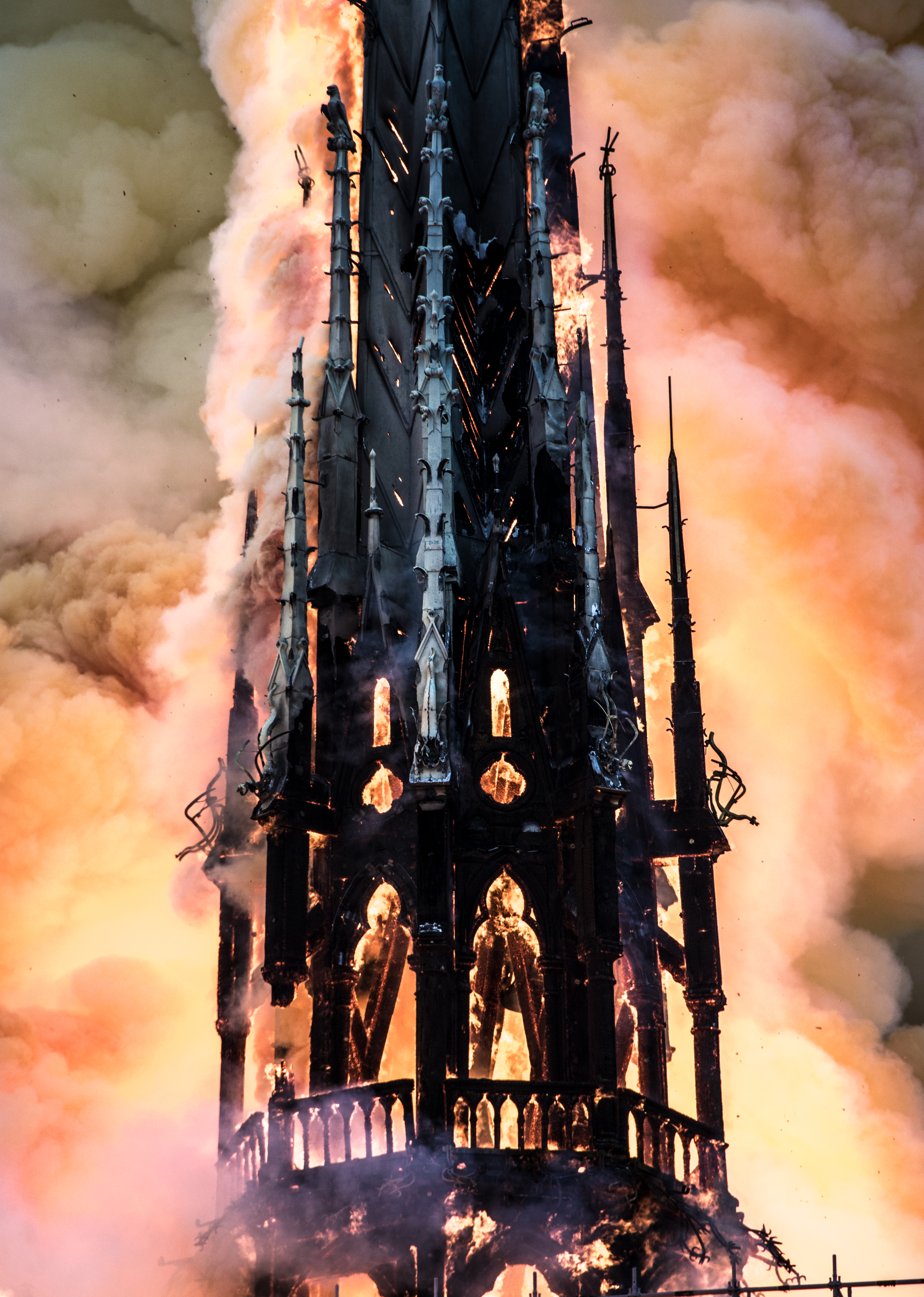
Close up of the Spire during the blaze

On 15 April 2019, around 6:18 pm, a fire began in the eaves of the cathedral. Rapidly the fire spread to the rest of the roof. The heat, estimated to be more than 800 °C (1,470 °F) made the lead coating melt into the wood of the spire, which did not prevent it from burning. The fire emitted toxic fumes so neighboring areas were evacuated.

The upper part of the spire collapsed around 7:45 pm. Its fall caused the destruction of part of the vaults of the nave. The collapse of the tower caused the destruction of the crossing of the transept.

The sixteen statues around the spire had been taken down four days earlier and sent off to be restored. They were not affected by the fire. However, the rooster at the top of the spire became detached during the fall. Thought to be lost, It was found damaged but mainly intact in the debris the following day. It was sent to join the statues at Socra, a French art conservation society for repair.

=== Third spire ===
On 17 April 2019 the French Prime Minister Édouard Philippe announced the launch of an international architecture competition to design a new spire, which would define the nature of the reconstruction effort and decide if the new spire should be identical to the old, or a new design entirely.

The architect Jean Nouvel called for the faithful reconstruction of the original spire, saying that "it was an integral part of the Cathedral". In the following days, several architecture firms released new proposals for the spire. Foster and Partners of London proposed a new roof and spire made of stainless steel, glass, and crystal, while the French architecture firm Godart + Roussel Architectes of Dijon proposed a structure made of glass panels and copper tiles.

Ultimately, however, it was decided that the spire's exterior would be reconstructed to match the 19th-century design by Viollet-le-Duc.

On 16 December 2023 the new gold copper spire rooster, which had been blessed by Archbishop of Paris Laurent Ulrich, was put on the new spire to complete it. It was revealed on 13 February 2024.

== In popular culture ==
=== Cinema ===
- In the 1996 Disney animated film The Hunchback of Notre Dame, Quasimodo climbs the spire while singing "Out There". Although the film is set in 1482, the spire resembles the second iteration built in the 19th Century.

=== Video game ===
- Viollet-le-Duc's spire appeared in the 2014 action-adventure video game Assassin's Creed Unity, developed by Ubisoft Montréal. The depiction of the spire was very detailed and the player could even climb it. The game is set during the French Revolution so the presence of the 19th-century spire is an anachronism. This was done intentionally, because a representation of the original spire, which at that time was damaged and being dismantled, would have been jarring for players.
