= Yea =

Yea, Ye-A, YEA, or yea may refer to:

- An archaic form of yes, the opposite of nay

== Places ==
- Yea, Victoria, a town in Australia
- Yea River, Victoria, Australia
- Shire of Yea, Victoria, Australia, a former local government area

== People ==
- Lacy Walter Giles Yea (1808–1855), British Army colonel who distinguished himself in the Crimean War
- Philip Yea (born 1954), British businessman and investor
- Yea baronets

== Other uses ==
- General and Speciality Workers' Union, a former trade union in Finland
- Yea Chronicle, a weekly newspaper in Victoria, Australia
- IATA airport code for all airports serving Edmonton, Alberta, Canada: Edmonton International Airport and Edmonton City Centre Airport
- yea, ISO 639-3 code for the Ravula language, spoken in Karnataka, India

== See also ==
- Yeah (disambiguation)
