= The YES! Association =

Artist collective founded in 2005

The YES! Association (also known by its Swedish name, Föreningen JA!) is an art collective based in Sweden. The collective was founded in 2005 and continues to be active today. The collective creates art through the use of enactments and performances. The YES! Association is known primarily for art exhibitions that deal with themes of gender, sexuality, race, and capitalism.

== Formation ==
The YES! Association was founded in 2005. It originated out of an art exhibition entitled “Art Feminism - strategies and effects in Sweden from the 1970’s until today”. Responding to a perceived lack of equity in Swedish public art institutions, members of the YES! Association proposed a document, dubbed the “Equal Opportunities Agreement”. The YES! Association used their live work “Press Conference /Performance”, a part of the broader exhibition, to provide art institutions with the opportunity to sign the agreement. Institutional signatories would have committed to engage in concrete actions to increase diversity and equity, particularly through the use of quotas. If it had been signed by the art organizations the agreement would have been legally binding. However, no institutions present at the time agreed to sign the document.

== Key figures ==
The YES! Association is composed of original founding members and newer participants. Founding members include

- Malin Arnell, a feminist artist whose work engages with concepts of intimacy and power.
- Johanna Gustavsson, an artist whose work focuses on pedagogy.
- Line S. Karlström, an artist with a focus on the interplay of power and identity.
- Anna Linder, a feminist artist known for her work in moving images.
- Fia-Stina Sandlund, a Swedish artist known for feminist art films.

Other members of the collective over the years include:

- Åsa Elzén, an artist whose work focuses on post-colonial and intersectional feminist theory.

The YES! Association has collaborated with artists and institutions including Melanie Cervantes, Regina José Galindo, Gluklya, Victoria Lomasko, Pauline Boudry/Renate Lorenz, Liza Morozova, Tanja Ostojic, Mujeres Públicas, Bureau of Melodramatic Research, and Anna Zvyagintseva. In addition, The YES! Association has received support from the Swedish Arts Council through the IASPIS program, facilitating collaborations with queer artist Lee H. Jones.

== Themes ==
Artistic works by The YES! Association have predominantly dealt with themes of gender, sexuality, race, and capitalism. Drawing on the feminist activist roots of the artists making up the collective (see above for an overview of Key Figures), exhibitions have investigated the role of women and other equity seeking groups in both the art world and society more broadly. In these works, several sub-themes emerge:

=== Equity and diversity in art ===
The founding work of the YES! Association was an activist call for accountability and increased diversity in Swedish public art. Since the 2005 work “Press Conference /Performance”, the YES! Association has used a variety of platforms such as radio interviews, panels, and articles to argue that contemporary art must do a better job of representing equity seeking communities. In particular, the YES! Association has used the exploration of notions of privilege and oppression to illustrate divides in the art world.

=== Intersectional feminist theory ===
The YES! Association's artwork has repeatedly come back to investigations of intersectional modes of feminist art. In particular, the collective has focused on the benefits and drawbacks of knowledge that is based on categories. Through their work, the YES! Association has challenged the utility of binaries, making a feminist argument for a more intersectional understanding of identity. Their work rarely looks at ‘women’ as an isolated category, opting instead to include considerations such a class, race, and sexuality, as well.

=== Hannah Arendt ===
Political theorist Hannah Arendt has been cited as both a theme and inspiration in the work of the YES! Association. A Jewish-American thinker, Arendt was born in Germany and fled Europe during the Second World War. Her work dealt largely with systems of power, particularly political hierarchies such as totalitarianism. A noted woman theorist in a field dominated by men, Arendt is often held up as an example of feminist excellence (though she herself may not have used the label “feminist”). The YES! Association has created works that drew on Arendt's commitment to the spread of ideas and conversation. The collective has also collaborated with associations devoted to the memory of Arendt, such as The Hannah Arendt Center for Politics and Humanities at Bard College.

=== Notable works ===
The works of the YES! Association have taken a variety of forms but commonly include aspects of performance and dialogue.

==== “Press conference /performance”, 2005, Performance. ====
For the piece, members of the YES! Association put forward a document entitled the “Equal Opportunities Agreement”. The document aimed to legally bind Swedish public art institutions to uphold quotas to improve diversity. The performance was executed in the Dunker Culture House.

==== "(Dis)agreements? – the utility, effectiveness, and problematics of categories." 2010. Performance, a video, an agreement, a teach-in, and a letter. ====
The work used a video and teach-in discussion to consider diversity in art institutions. The work took place at the Elizabeth A. Sackler Center for Feminist Art of Brooklyn Museum.

==== “SMOKING AREA”, 2012, Floor Painting. ====
“SMOKING AREA” paid tribute to political theorist Hannah Arendt. The work used a floor painting made with yellow paint to create a designated space where viewers/ participants could come, smoke, and discuss ideas. The floor painting aimed to further the aims of Arendt, whose work argued for the power of friendship and dialogue. The work was hosted by the Hannah Arendt Center at Bard College.

==== “I am talking about something happening right here, right now”, 2012, Discussion. ====
This work operated as a discussion with Lee H. Jones. Using an activist framework, the discussion centered around the interplay of institutions and labour. The work was funded by IASPIS.

=== Notable exhibitions ===
==== "Art Feminism – Strategies and Consequences in Sweden from the 1970s to the Present", 2005. ====
This was the first exhibition that the YES! Association participated in. The Dunker Culture House served as the host institution. The YES! Association performed their work “Press Conference /Performance”.

==== “The Privilege Walk/Symposium – Feminist and intersectional aspects of contemporary art”, 2008. ====
The exhibition operated as a symposium held over the course of a weekend at the Lilith Performance Studio in Malmo, Sweden. Components included lectures, film screenings, performances, and workshops. Thematically, the exhibition focused on the Swedish art movement and persisting equity concerns.

==== “(art)work(sport)work(sex)work”, 2015. ====
The exhibition was hosted by the Power Plant in Toronto, Canada. The work was commissioned in conjunction with the 2015 Pan Am games. It considered the three fields of art, sport, and sex work. Through the use of bus rides, the exhibition used urban space to comment on social norms.
