= Youth Energy Squad =

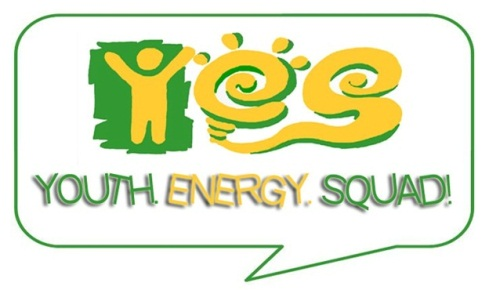
Youth Energy Squad

Y.E.S Learning Partner

Youth Energy Squad is a student-run, non-profitable green Project Based on Exchange (PBoX) established by AIESEC by University Sains Malaysia. It is a youth platform which promotes the awareness of energy usage and also to ensure sustainable project impacts on energy wastage issue.

The quote or target line for Y.E.S. is "Yellow To Green" which gives the impression on the effort of reducing energy usage and turning into renewable energy for planet Earth.

Currently partnering with CETREE, it aims to provide a professional interactive education to high school students about renewable energy and energy efficiency.
