= Maîtrise Notre Dame de Paris =

French music school

Maîtrise Notre Dame de Paris is a music school situated in Paris, France. Its origins can be dated to the 12th century and are associated with the rise of the cathedral of Notre-Dame.
