= Yeah Yeah =

Yeah Yeah may refer to:

- "Yeah Yeah" (Sabrina song), 1990
- "Yeah Yeah" (Bodyrox song), 2006
- "Yeah Yeah" (Willy Moon song), 2012
- Yeah Yeah Records, an American record label
- "Yeah Yeah", a song by Cheryl Cole from Messy Little Raindrops
- "Yeah Yeah", a song by Cyndi Lauper from She's So Unusual
- "Yeah Yeah", a song by Jaden Smith from The Sunset Tapes: A Cool Tape Story
- "Yeah, Yeah", a song by Nik Kershaw from You've Got to Laugh
- "Yeah Yeah", a song by Travis Scott featuring Young Thug

== See also ==
- Yeah (disambiguation)
- Yeah Yeah Yeah (disambiguation)
- Yé-yé, a 1960s style of French pop music
- "Yeh, Yeh", a 1963 song recorded by Georgie Fame and the Blue Flames in 1964 and Matt Bianco in 1985
- Yeah Yeah Yeah Yeah, the Bikini Kill side of a 1993 split album with Huggy Bear
- "Yeah Yeah Yeah Yeah Yeah", a 1988 song by the Pogues
- "She Loves You", a 1963 song by the Beatles
